= Sanok Construction Company =

Polish construction company (1950–1993)

- Native name: Sanockie Przedsiębiorstwo Budowlane (Polish)
- Company type: State-owned enterprise
- Founded: 1950 (initially) → 1981
- Defunct: 1993
- Headquarters: 3 Zamkowa Street, Sanok, Poland

Sanok Construction Company (Polish: Sanockie Przedsiębiorstwo Budowlane, SPB) was a state-owned construction company based in Sanok, Poland, operating from 1950 until its liquidation in 1993.

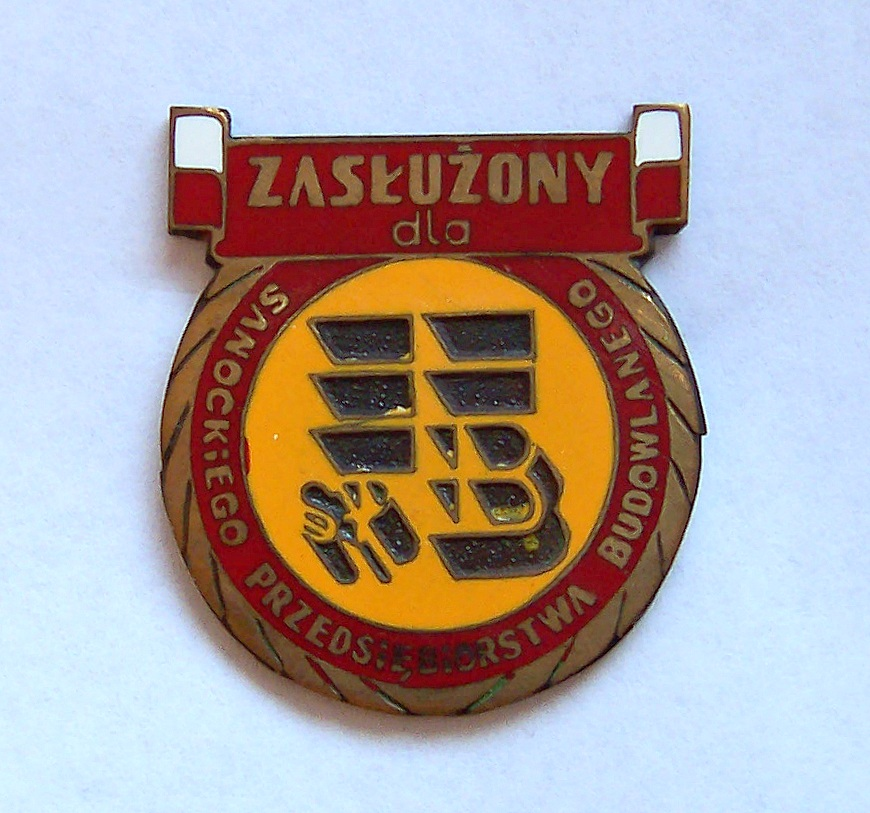
Badge "Meritorious for Sanok Construction Company"

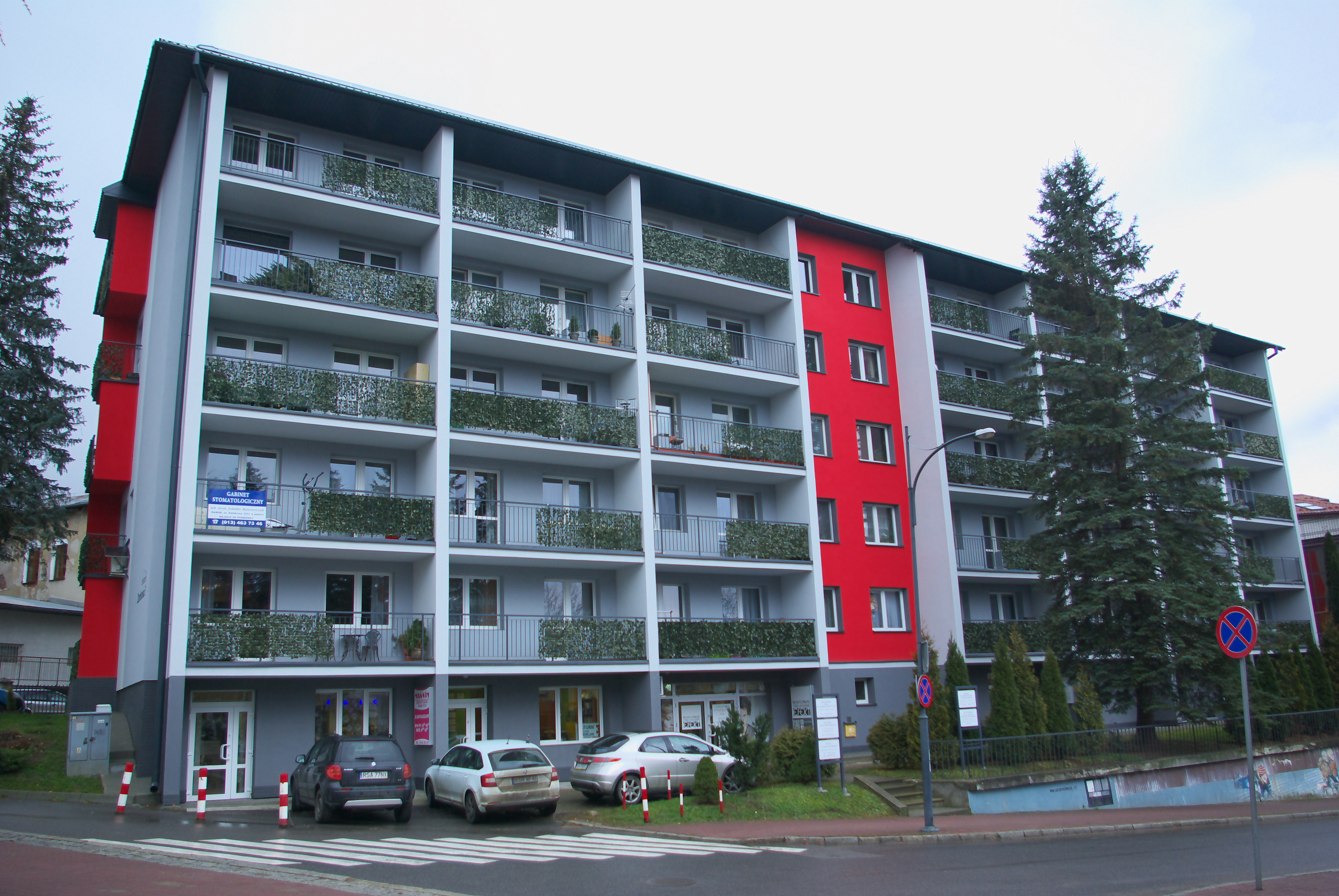
Residential block at 3 Zamkowa Street, former Sanok Construction Company headquarters (2017)

== History ==
The history of the Sanok Construction Company, accounting for structural reorganizations, dates back to the late 1940s and early 1950s. Its direct predecessor was the Social Construction Company, which focused on post-war reconstruction following damage from World War II and actions by the Ukrainian Insurgent Army. The company's origins trace back to the establishment of the Samopomoc Chłopska Rural Construction Cooperative in Rzeszów in 1947 and the creation of its organizational unit, Biuro Rolne, in Pielnia in 1949. This cooperative was dissolved in 1950.

=== County Construction Company (1950–1955) ===
Following a decree by the Ministers of Construction and Public Administration on 30 January 1950, the state-owned territorial enterprise County Construction Company in Sanok was established on 1 April 1950. The Sanok branch was one of 10 created in the Rzeszów Voivodeship, administratively subordinate to the Presidium of the Sanok County National Council and colloquially referred to as "BeP". The assets of the Samopomoc Chłopska cooperative were transferred to the new entity. The directors of County Construction Company included Bolesław Czekierda (1950–1951), Jan Tchórzewski (1951), Jan Barański, Jan Hnatuśko (1953), and Zdzisław Polakiewicz (until 1957). From 1950 to 1956, Arnold Andrunik served as administrative manager and deputy director. Initially, the enterprise operated from the tenement at 22 Lipca Street, and in the mid-1950s, an office barracks was built at Ludwik Waryński Street. The enterprise constructed residential buildings for its employees at Stanisław Staszic Street in Sanok.

The primary task of County Construction Company was the construction of rural facilities and the production of building materials and components. From 1950, it operated as a county enterprise, performing repairs on agricultural buildings and structures. Initially, it focused on building single-family homes for farmers in villages near Sanok, later expanding to multi-family homes and agricultural structures such as barns, granaries, sheepfolds, forester's lodges, and warehouses, including for State Agricultural Farms. On 31 December 1955, the enterprise was reorganized and renamed as the territorial branch of the Rzeszów Regional Construction Association under the name Construction Administration No. 5 in Sanok. Its operational area included the Sanok and Lesko counties, and after incorporating the Ustrzyki Dolne enterprise on 1 July 1955, it extended to the Ustrzyki Dolne and Brzozów counties, later encompassing cities within these regions.

=== Local Construction Company (1957–1962) ===
Following further structural changes in rural construction, the Local Construction Company was established on 1 April 1957, as confirmed by a decree of the Presidium of the Sanok County National Council on 31 December 1957. In 1960, the enterprise transitioned to general and industrial construction. The scope of the Local Construction Company's activities expanded from rural and forestry construction to general construction, including residential buildings, as well as service and production works. The directors of the enterprise were Władysław Radzik (from 1 April 1957 to July 1959) and Zdzisław Janicki (until 1963).

=== Sanok Construction Company (1963–1978) ===
After several years, the enterprise was transformed into a construction company, and by a decree of the Minister of Construction and Building Materials Industry on 20 December 1962, the Sanok Construction Company in Sanok was established on 1 January 1963, under the Rzeszów Construction Association and the Ministry of Construction and Building Materials Industry. In 1965, the Sanok municipal construction enterprise and similar enterprises in Lesko and Ustrzyki Dolne were incorporated into Sanok Construction Company. In 1976, three separate work group managements were established in Sanok, Brzozów, and the Bieszczady region, based in Lesko and Ustrzyki Dolne. Sanok Construction Company's operational area included the cities of Sanok, Brzozów, Dynów, Lesko, Rzepedź, Ustrzyki Dolne, and Zagórz. Thus, Sanok Construction Company became the sole monopolistic construction enterprise in southeastern Rzeszów Voivodeship, later covering most of the Krosno Voivodeship, tasked with executing construction investments in the Sanok, Brzozów, Lesko, and Ustrzyki Dolne counties, significantly contributing to the enterprise's development and the region's infrastructure, including the development of the Bieszczady Mountains. In 1969, Sanok Construction Company's administration and management were relocated from Waryński Street to a new office building at 3 Zamkowa Street (formerly the site of the Great Synagogue until September 1939). The building also housed a workers' hostel.

The primary activities of Sanok Construction Company included construction and assembly works, with a focus on residential and public utility buildings, rural construction, installation works, production of building components, and service activities. In the 1970s, Sanok Construction Company increased its residential construction output, delivering between 500 and 600 apartments annually. The company constructed numerous facilities, including housing estates, schools, dormitories, kindergartens, nurseries, healthcare facilities, commercial and industrial buildings, and agricultural structures. By 1985, Sanok Construction Company had built 9,000 apartments for 35,000 residents, including 20,000 in Sanok. It constructed 40 educational facilities by 1977, including 36 schools (five in Sanok, three in Lesko, and two each in Brzozów and Ustrzyki Dolne). Notable projects included:

- the Czaszyn Elementary School in 1961,
- several Thousandth Anniversary Schools, such as:
  - the 20th Anniversary of the Polish People's Republic Elementary School in Humniska (1964),
  - Janek Krasicki Elementary School in Zagórz (1964),
  - Elementary School in Ropienka (1964),
  - PKWN Manifesto Elementary School in Przysietnica (1964),
  - Gen. Karol Świerczewski Elementary School in Cisna (1965),
  - Elementary School in Pielnia (1966),
  - Elementary School in Długie (1966),
  - St. Kinga Elementary School (1966),
- school in Brzozów (1965),
- the building of Commission of National Education High School,
- the Casimir III the Great School Complex until 1975, and its dormitory,
- Elementary School No. 7,
- the Construction School in Brzozów.
- the Stomil Kindergarten in Sanok,
- healthcare facilities such as:
  - the Sanok Specialist Hospital,
  - the Polańczyk sanatorium complex, including the Atrium Builders' Holiday Home.
- industrial facilities such as:
  - the Plastics Plant in Stara Wieś,
  - the Shoe Factory in Dynów,
- Sanok Dairy Cooperative,
- the Lace Factory in Brzozów/Stara Wieś,
- chemical industry plants Gamrat in Brzozów
- Krosno Furniture Factory plants
- Toy Factory in Lesko
- Horseshoe Factory in Dynów
- tannery in Rymanów
- the Waste Disposal Plant in Wróblik,
- bakeries (e.g., a mechanized bakery in Sanok),
- restaurants (e.g., Karpacka restaurant in Sanok),
- hotels (e.g., Dom Turysty in Sanok),
- recreational facilities (e.g., swimming pools in Sanok, including an indoor pool),
- a workers' hostel in Ustrzyki Dolne,
- a sewage treatment plant in Trepcza,
- road infrastructure,
- various commercial-service buildings.
- housing estates, such as:
  - the Traugutt estate and others in Sanok's Wójtostwo district,
  - the Waryński estate in the Błonie district,
  - an estate in Lesko.

In 1977, the Sanok Construction Company renovated the Castle Stairs in Sanok, known as the Builders' Stairs until 1989, when their original name was restored.

The enterprise's growth is reflected in production data: in 1951, the core production value was 10,814 PLN, reaching 286,401 PLN by 1975, with a global production value of 316,981 PLN that year. The volume of constructed facilities increased from 25,894 m³ in 1959 to 288,100 m³ in 1976, an 11-fold increase. By 1977, Sanok Construction Company had built facilities worth 3 billion PLN. Employment also grew significantly, from 497 workers (353 manual, 79 administrative) in 1960 to 1,294 (861 manual, 223 administrative) in 1975, surpassing 1,000 employees in 1973.

The directors of Sanok Construction Company included Zdzisław Janicki (until 30 June 1963), Mieczysław Gromek (interim until 1 March 1964), Władysław Radzik (from 1 March 1964 to 1 March 1966), Franciszek Olszewski (from March 1966 to 31 May 1971), and Józef Baszak (from May 1971 to 5 July 1978).

Sanok Construction Company was a patron of the Casimir III the Great School Complex, training future employees. It also employed graduates from the Brzozów construction school and the Voluntary Labor Corps based in Ustrzyki Dolne. Before 1977, a Branch Faculty of Civil Engineering was established at the Rzeszów University of Technology. After 1980, Sanok Construction Company formed structures of Solidarity, with Paweł Szałaj elected as a delegate to the National Congress in 1981. In early December 1983, Aleksander Paraniak was elected the first secretary of the Sanok Construction Company's Polish United Workers' Party Factory Committee. Ryszard Gawlewicz, head of Sanok Construction Company's Prefabricated Elements Plant, died on duty in 1989.

=== House Factory ===
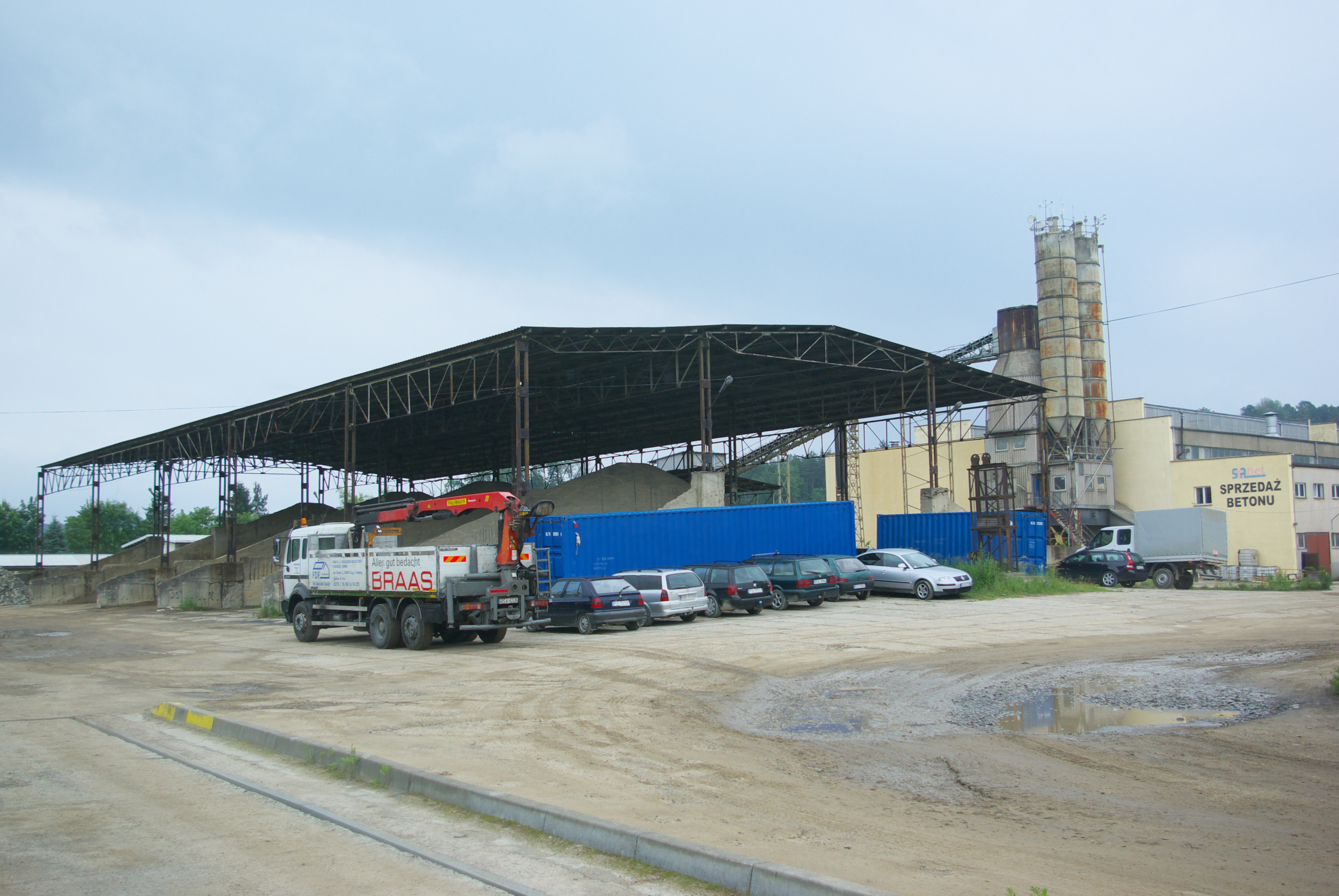
Site of the former House Factory

In 1974, Sanok Construction Company initiated the House Factory project in Sanok, operational from 1976, focusing on prefabricated residential construction. Located at 40 II Armii Wojska Polskiego Street in Sanok's Dąbrówka district, it produced prefabricated panels for apartment construction. Clients included the Sanok Housing Cooperative, Autosan, Sanok Oil Industry, Timber Plants in Rzepedź, and Sanok Meat Plants.

=== Construction and Assembly Plant (1978–1981) ===
Due to a reorganization by the Rzeszów Construction Association, the Sanok Construction Company was transformed into the Construction and Assembly Plant on 1 July 1978, under the Krosno Construction Combine. Following Józef Baszak's resignation in protest of the reorganization, Andrzej Radzik became director on 5 July 1978. The enterprise was then referred to as Sanok Construction and Assembly Plant.

Between 1979 and 1981, Construction and Assembly Plant constructed two kindergartens in Sanok, a nursery at Robotnicza Street, an automatic telephone exchange in Sanok, a central boiler house at Kiczury Street in Sanok, the Sanok Meat Plants' headquarters, a kindergarten in Ustrzyki Dolne, the Halicz Department Store in Ustrzyki Dolne, a kindergarten in Brzozów, the ERG Plastics Plant in Brzozów, an ambulance base in Lesko, an ambulance facility in Sanok, a kindergarten in Polańczyk, the Siarkopol sanatorium in Polańczyk, a cement transfer station in Uherce, department stores in Brzozów and Lesko, and the Sanepid station in Sanok.

=== Sanok Construction Company (1981–1993) ===
Following efforts to restore the enterprise's independence, a decree by the Minister of Construction and Building Materials Industry on 25 March 1981 re-established the Sanok Construction Company, under the Rzeszów Construction Association. The new entity inherited Construction and Assembly Plant's assets. Its activities included construction projects, residential buildings, auxiliary production, and services.

Between 1981 and 1984, Sanok Construction Company constructed:

- the Błonie ice rink in Sanok,
- technical workshops for the Walenty Lipiński and Mateusz Beksiński School Complex,
- Elementary School No. 3 in Sanok,
- a kindergarten and nursery at Waryński Street in Sanok,
- a hospital in Ustrzyki Dolne,
- SPGK facilities at 15 Długa Street in Sanok,
- barracks in Arłamów,
- a museum in Jabłonki,
- a cemetery in Baligród,
- a monument to fallen militia members in Cisna.

In the late 1980s, Sanok Construction Company built:

- Elementary School No. 8 in Sanok,
- Brzozów Specialist Hospital,
- an office building at 1 Henryk Sienkiewicz Street in Sanok,
- residential buildings in Sanok's Waryński and Słowacki estates and in Ustrzyki Dolne.

Overall, Sanok Construction Company constructed 7,214 apartments for approximately 29,000 residents, including 4,750 apartments for 20,000 residents in Sanok. Additional housing estates were built in Sanok at Ignacy Daszyński Street, John III Sobieski Street, Zamkowa Street, Berek Joselewicz Street, Adam Mickiewicz Street, Poprzeczna Street, Cegielniana Street, John Paul II Street, and the Posada district, as well as estates in Nowy Zagórz near the Nowy Zagórz railway station, the C estate in Rzepedź, the Smolki estate in Lesko, the PCK and Strwiążek estates in Ustrzyki Dolne, the central estate in Brzozów, the Traugutt estate in Krosno (Polanka), and the Zamkowe estate in Będzin. A notable case was the halted construction of a cinema at Feliks Giela Square in Sanok, abandoned after the framework was erected due to the client's withdrawal.

In the 1980s, Sanok Construction Company employees worked on export construction projects, including in Libya. By the mid-1980s, Sanok Construction Company collaborated with Polish and foreign companies. The enterprise operated its own medical clinic. Sanok Construction Company supported the Sanok Tennis Club, based at tennis courts it built at Adam Mickiewicz Street, and established shooting and volleyball sections within the company.

Throughout its existence, many Sanok Construction Company employees received state awards and badges. In 1984, Sanok Construction Company was awarded the Gold Medal "Guardian of National Remembrance Sites". In 1985, a company banner was established, and the "Meritorious for Sanok Construction Company" badge was instituted, approved by the Minister of Construction and Building Materials Industry.

On 28 September 1985, during the 35th anniversary celebration of Sanok Construction Company at the Sanok House of Culture, attended by party and local government representatives, the company's banner was awarded and decorated with the collective honorary badge "For Merits to the Krosno Voivodeship" by Henryk Wojtal, First Secretary of the Polish United Workers' Party Provincial Committee in Krosno, and Tadeusz Kruk, Krosno Voivode, as well as the Badge "Meritorious for the Bieszczady". During the event, Sanok Construction Company employees received state and industry awards, and 30 employees were awarded the "Meritorious for Sanok Construction Company" badge for the first time. The Sanok Construction Company banner was also honored with the Badge "Meritorious for Sanok".

In the 1980s, Sanok Construction Company ranked fourth among Sanok enterprises, behind Autosan, Stomil, and the Oil Industry. During the late 1980s and early 1990s, amid the decline of the Polish People's Republic and the subsequent political transformation, orders for residential projects decreased due to reduced investment by the Sanok Housing Cooperative. Andrzej Radzik, director since 1978, was dismissed on 17 April 1990, and Władysław Poraszka served as interim director from 27 April 1990, becoming permanent director on 1 July 1990. In 1990, Sanok Construction Company built the Polańczyk municipal office and an elementary school in Lesko.

To pursue privatization, on 30 April 1991, Sanok Construction Company applied to transform into a sole-shareholder company of the State Treasury. After the Ministry of Ownership Transformations rejected the request in 1991, the Sanok Construction Company workers' council initiated liquidation-based privatization. In late 1991, the Krosno Voivode appointed a commissary board to implement a recovery plan, which was dissolved in 1992. On 16 November 1992, the Krosno Voivode ordered Sanok Construction Company's liquidation, ceasing statutory activities on 31 January 1993. Bankruptcy was declared on 19 November 1993, with proceedings concluded on 11 March 1998.

By 1993, the Sanok Construction Company headquarters at Zamkowa Street was converted into a residential block. Subsequently, Sanok Construction Company's headquarters operated at 40 II Armii Wojska Polskiego Street.

== Bibliography ==
- Sanockie Przedsiębiorstwo Budowlane [Sanok Construction Company] (in Polish). Warsaw: WDA – Zakład Typograficzny. 1978.
- Baszak, Józef (2014). "Powstanie i Rozwój Sanockiego Przedsiębiorstwa Budowlanego (1950-1978). Fabryka Domów – zwiastun postępu" [Establishment and Development of the Sanok Construction Company (1950–1978). House Factory – A Harbinger of Progress]. Budownictwo. Sanockie Przedsiębiorstwo Ceramiki Budowlanej. Sanockie Przedsiębiorstwo Budowlane [Construction: Sanok Building Ceramics Company, Sanok Construction Company] (in Polish). Zakład Usługowo-Poligraficzny Piast Kołodziej. ISBN 978-83-934513-6-4.
- Radzik, Andrzej (2014). "Sanockie Przedsiębiorstwo Budowlane Lata 1978-1993". Budownictwo. Sanockie Przedsiębiorstwo Ceramiki Budowlanej. Sanockie Przedsiębiorstwo Budowlane [Sanockie Przedsiębiorstwo Budowlane Years 1978–1993] (in Polish). Sanok: Zakład Usługowo-Poligraficzny Piast Kołodziej. ISBN 978-83-934513-6-4.
