= Przysietnica =

Przysietnica may refer to the following places in Poland:

- Przysietnica, Subcarpathian Voivodeship (south-west Poland)
- Przysietnica, Lesser Poland Voivodeship (south Poland)
