= Zamkowa Street =

Street in Sanok, Poland

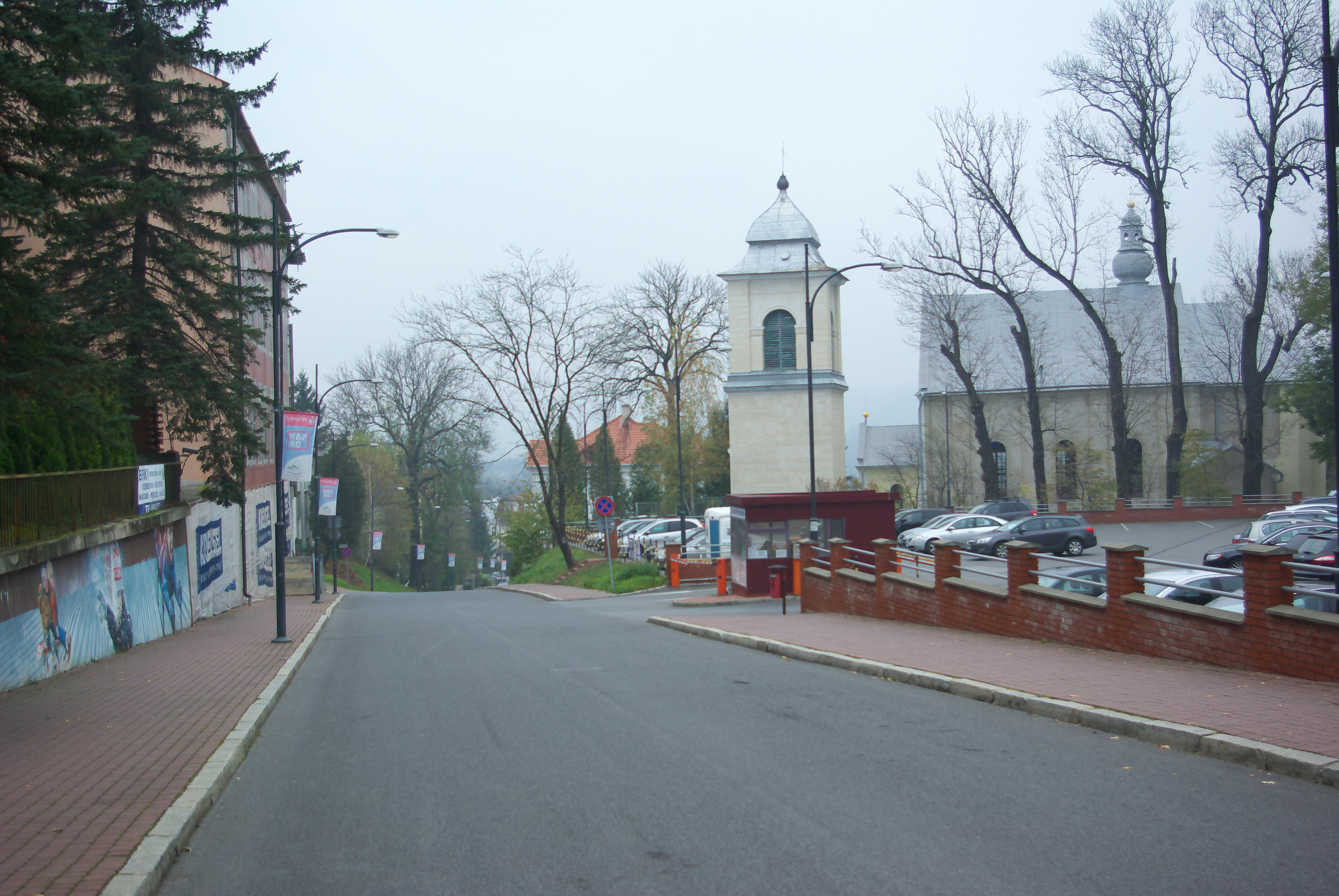
- Zamkowa Street in Sanok, 2014
- Interactive map of Zamkowa Street
- Native name: Ulica Zamkowa (Polish)
- Former name(s): Zamkowastrasse, Schlossstrasse
- Part of: Downtown
- Location: Sanok; Poland
- Coordinates: 49°33′47.4″N 22°12′26.2″E

Zamkowa Street is a street in the Downtown district of Sanok, Poland. It extends westward from the intersection of Market Square and St. John's Square to Adam Mickiewicz Street, where it continues as Żwirko and Wigura Street.

The street's name originates from its path leading to the Sanok Castle. During the Austrian Partition under Galician autonomy in the late 19th and early 20th centuries, the street was primarily inhabited by the Jewish population. During World War II, under German occupation, the street was renamed to the German name Zamkowastrasse in 1940, and later Schlossstrasse in 1941.

== Architecture ==
In 1972, the Sanok Castle and other buildings at 2, 19, 20, 22, and 28 Zamkowa Street were added to the updated Sanok register of historical monuments.

Buildings along Zamkowa Street from the Market Square and St. John's Square:

- Until September 1939, the Great Synagogue stood there. During the Polish People's Republic, an office building was constructed on the site, housing the administration and management of Sanok Construction Company from 1969, as well as a workers' hostel. The building was later converted into a residential block, with 64 apartments completed in 1993. This block is also listed as 3 Zamkowa Street.
  - Opposite the former synagogue site, in June 2014, a commemorative stone and plaque were erected to honor Jews murdered during World War II in Sanok. The Sanok City Council approved the initiative on 25 April 2013, with funding provided in the city budget. An earlier resolution on 20 September 2011 approved a plaque with different wording. The inscription, proposed by the Israel-Poland Friendship Society in Polish, Hebrew, and English, reads: "Opposite stood the synagogue, desecrated and burned by the German occupiers. In memory of over 10,000 Jews from Sanok and its surroundings murdered during World War II by German genocidists".
- The Sanok Inn at 2 Zamkowa Street, housing Sanok Historical Museum. The building is included in the provincial (1958) and municipal registers of Sanok monuments.
- Janusz Szuber Square, named in 2021, located at the exit to the Castle Stairs, between the former Inn and the castle complex.
- The Sanok Castle at 2 Zamkowa Street, included in the provincial (1952) and municipal (castle and the Royal Well) registers of Sanok monuments. Surrounding the castle are:
  - The outdoor sculpture Woje (Warriors) by Roman Tarkowski, installed in June 1975 for the Days of Culture, Education, Books, and Press.
  - A Norway maple, planted near the castle's entrance gate during the centenary celebrations of Poland's independence on 11 November 2018.
- The building at 5 Zamkowa Street, formerly one of two dormitories for Sanok economic schools (the other at 16 Zamkowa Street).
- The building at 7 Zamkowa Street, which housed a gendarmerie post until 1939.
- The non-existent house at 9 Zamkowa Street, formerly owned by the Hrabar family.
- The Evangelical Pentecostal Community Church at 11 Zamkowa Street, at the intersection with Cerkiewna Street. Previously numbered 217, it served as a military hospital in the late 19th and early 20th centuries.
- The Church of the Holy Trinity at 14 Zamkowa Street, originally Church of the Descent of the Holy Spirit, home to the parish of the same name. It is now an Orthodox parish church. The church complex (church and bell tower) is listed in the provincial (1952) and municipal registers of Sanok monuments.
- The tenement at 16 Zamkowa Street, housing the Parish of the Holy Trinity (until 2016, also the Diocese of Przemyśl and Gorlice). The building is included in the provincial (1987) and municipal registers of Sanok monuments.
- A building owned by the Kieszkowski family, located near the current intersection with John III Sobieski Street on the eastern side, demolished around the 1970s.
- A manor house at 19 Zamkowa Street, built in 1888, no longer extant, previously listed in the register of historical monuments.
- The house at 20 Zamkowa Street, a historical monument (1972), transferred to the Museum of Folk Architecture.
- The house at 22 Zamkowa Street, no longer extant, previously listed in the register of historical monuments.
- The house at 28 Zamkowa Street, a historical monument (1972).
- The building at 30 Zamkowa Street, included in the provincial (1990) and municipal registers of Sanok monuments.
- A non-existent manor house, approximately opposite the current intersection with Sanowa Street, owned by the Łepkowski family according to some sources and the Tchorznicki family according to others.

Before 1939, the Grand Hotel operated on the street, where photographer Jakub Puretz ran a photography studio. Notable residents included Father Wasylij Czemarnyk (house number 198) and Imperial-Royal Senior Court Counselor Joachim Tomaszewski.
