= Gabon (disambiguation) =

Gabon is a country in Central Africa.

Gabon may also refer to:

- Gabon River, the principal river of Gabon
- Gabon, the original name of Libreville, now the capital of Gabon
- Gaboń, a village in Poland

== See also ==
- Gaboon, tree
