= Sanok Historical Museum =

Regional museum in Sanok, Poland

- Muzeum Historyczne w Sanoku (Polish)
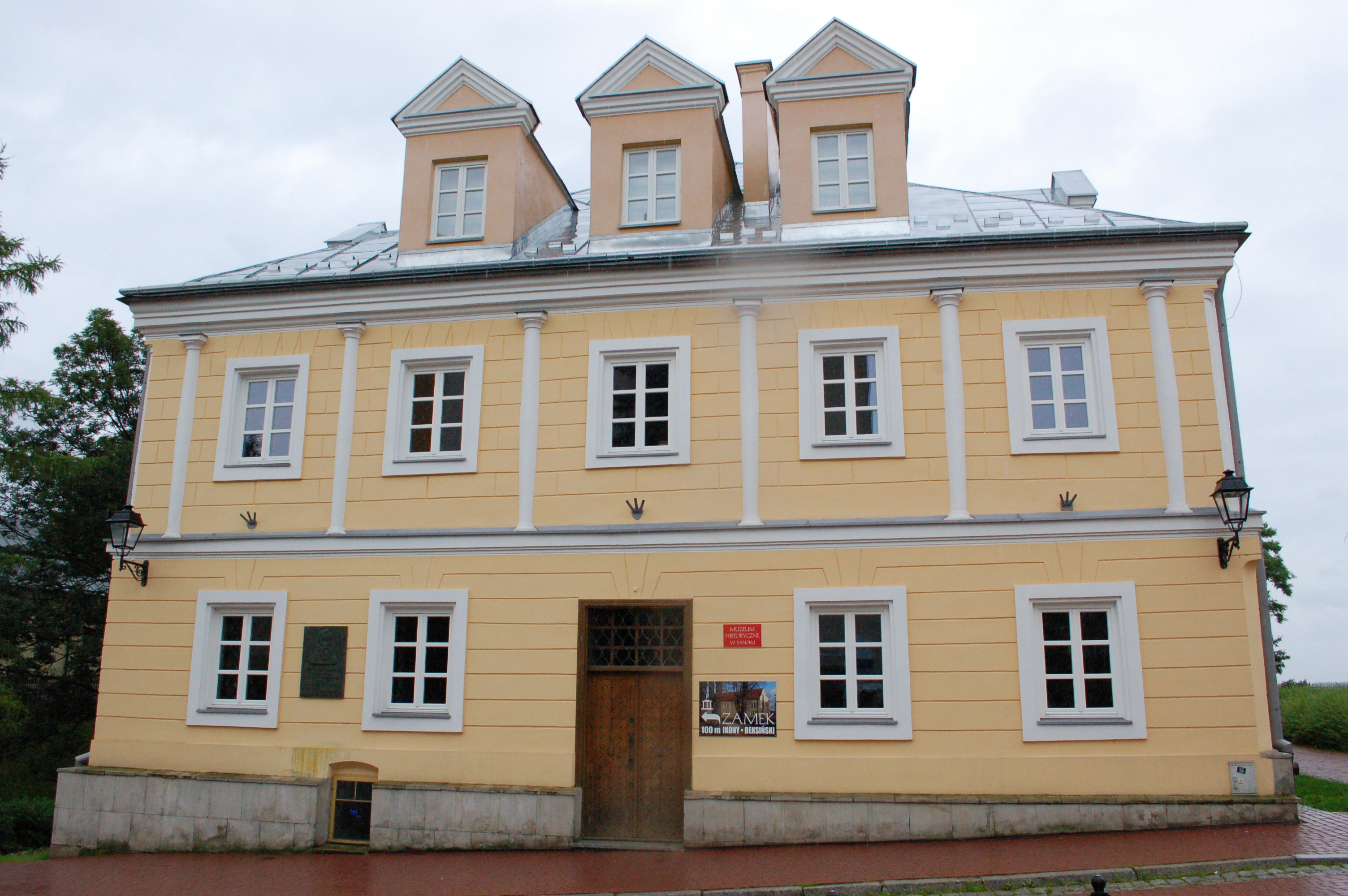
- Building at 2 Zamkowa Street (formerly the Austrian Guardhouse), currently housing the museum's administration and gallery
- Established: 1934
- Location: 2 Zamkowa Street, Sanok
- Coordinates: 49°33′41.4″N 22°12′29.3″E
- Collections: Historical and contemporary art
- Director: Jarosław Serafin
- Curator: Andrzej Romaniak
- Website: www.muzeum.sanok.pl

The Sanok Historical Museum is a regional museum located in Sanok, Poland.

It houses the world's largest collection of works by Zdzisław Beksiński. The museum also holds collections of historical and contemporary art. In the Podkarpackie Voivodeship, it ranks third in visitor numbers, following the Łańcut Castle and the Museum of Folk Architecture.

== History ==
The initial efforts to collect artifacts for the future Museum of the Sanok Land were undertaken by Aleksander Rybicki, Adam Fastnacht, and Stefan Stefański, who were students at the Sanok gymnasium at the time. A significant role in establishing the Museum of the Sanok Land was played by the then-mayor of Sanok, Tadeusz Malawski, who gathered numerous artifacts and memorabilia in the city hall, which were later transferred to the newly established museum. The institution was formally established in 1934 as the Museum of the Sanok Land, initiated by Dr. Jadwiga Przeworska from the Ministry of Religious Affairs and Public Education and the Sanok starosta, Dr. Bolesław Skwarczyński. Under Polish auspices, the Museum of the Sanok Land operated until 1939 at the Sanok Castle, with its exhibition divided into historical, ecclesiastical, and ethnographic sections. Its mission was to collect, scientifically study, and make accessible the historical artifacts of the Sanok Land. In 1934, a commemorative plaque was installed at the museum's entrance, reading: "In this building, part of the former Sanok Castle built by King Casimir the Great in the mid-14th century, notable for the wedding celebrations of King Władysław Jagiełło on 2 May 1417, rebuilt under King Sigismund the Old by his wife Bona Sforza in the 16th century, the Museum of the Sanok Land was established through the efforts of the Friends of the Sanok Land Society in 1934". Historical research on the Sanok Land was conducted by Adam Fastnacht. In September 1937, an exhibition titled "Sanok Land in Painting, Sculpture, and Photography" was organized.

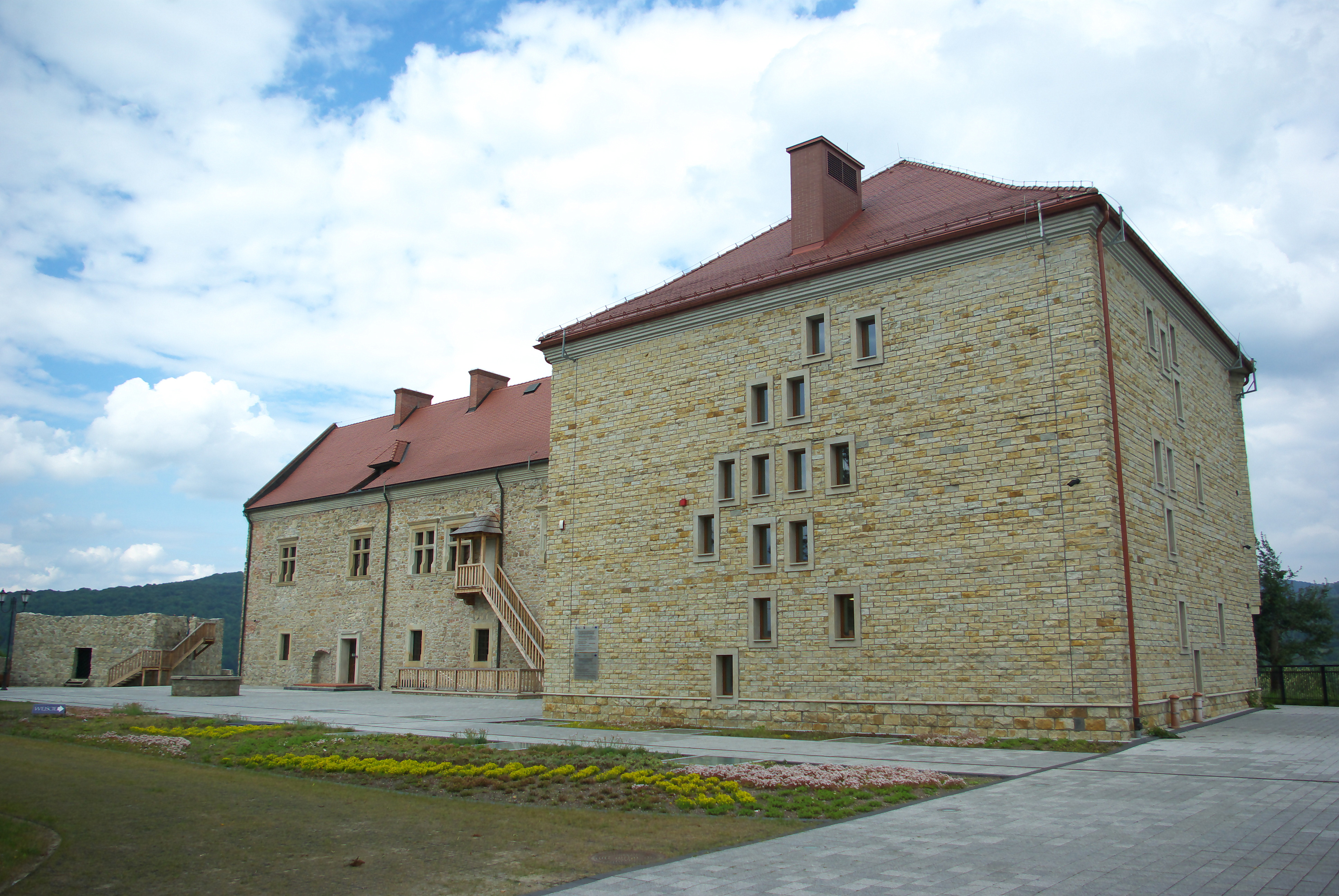
Sanok Castle

Following the outbreak of World War II in September 1939, the castle was looted. During the occupation, the castle housed the Kreismuseum in Sanok (District Museum in Sanok) and the Lemkivshchyna Museum. In August 1944, the museum's collections were again devastated by German forces, who removed approximately 300–400 of the most valuable artifacts, including royal charters for Sanok, paintings, handwritten books, and complete sets of folk costumes.

By order of the Minister of Culture and Art on 9 June 1950, the Museum of the Sanok Land was renamed the Sanok Museum. It later operated as the Sanok Regional Museum. In 1959, the museum celebrated its 25th anniversary.

A branch of the museum, General Karol Świerczewski Memorial House, was opened on 28 March 1987 in Jabłonki, near the general's monument, funded by the city of Sanok.

== Collections and exhibitions ==
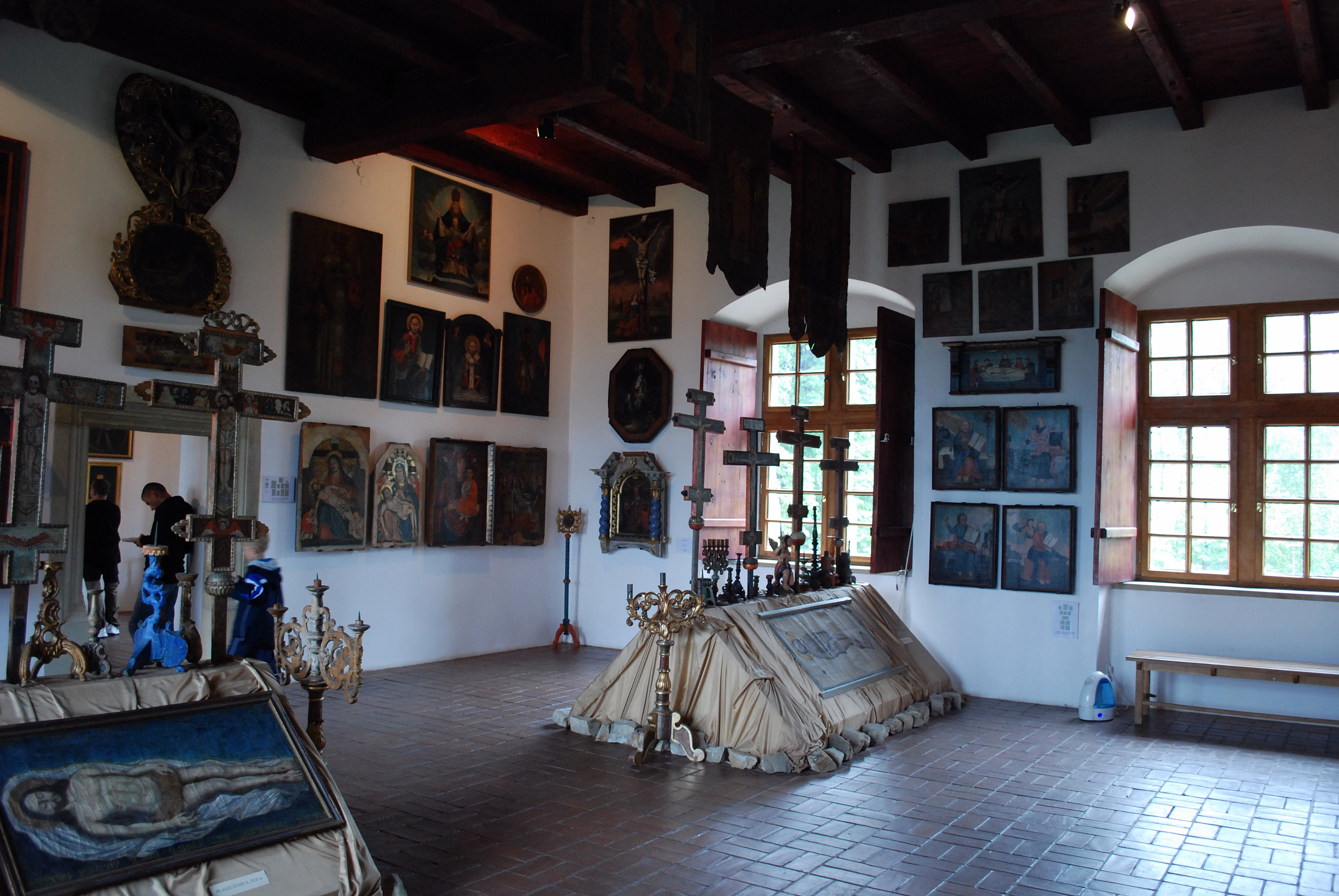
Collections of the Historical Museum

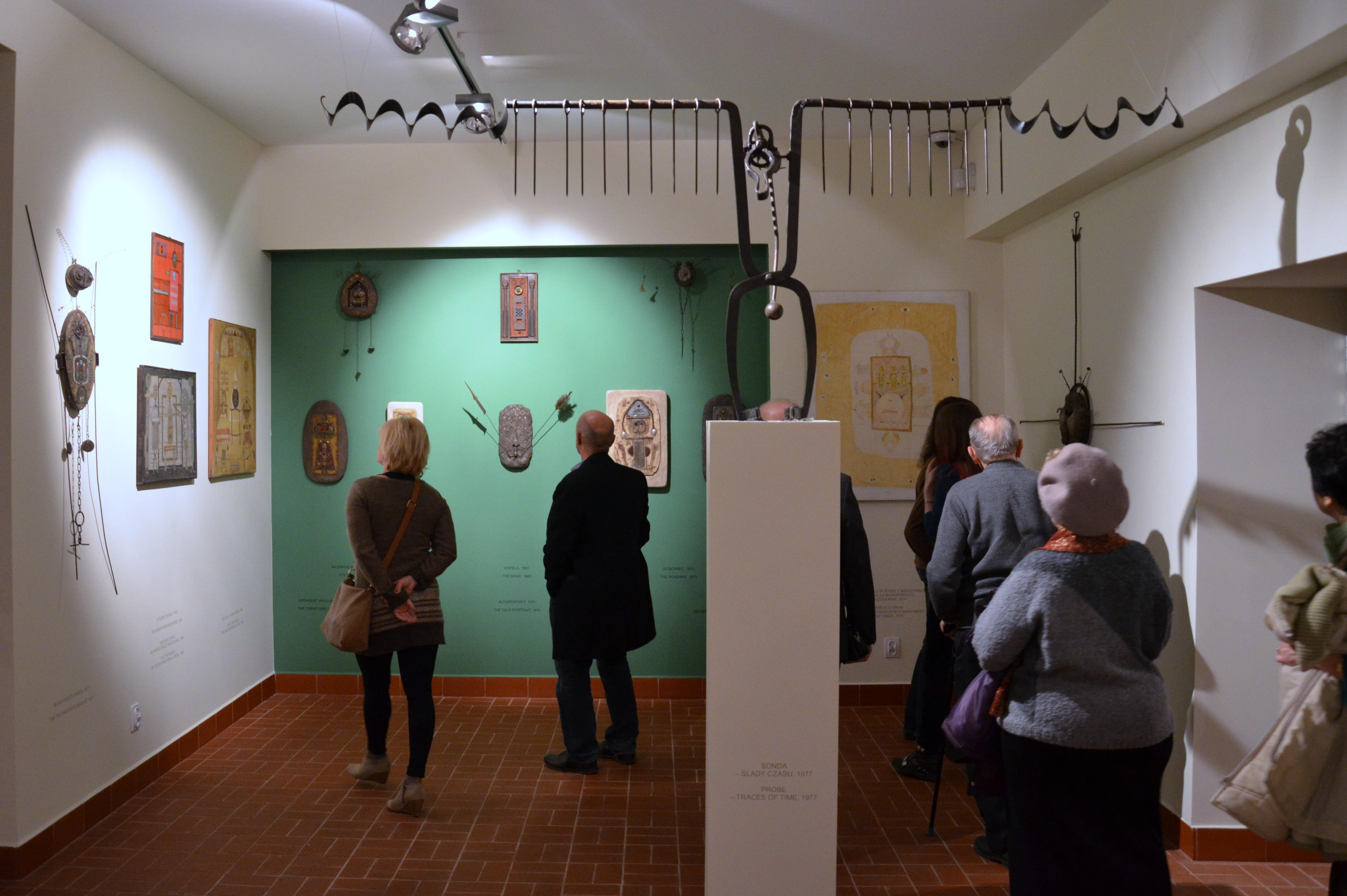
Marian Kruczek Gallery

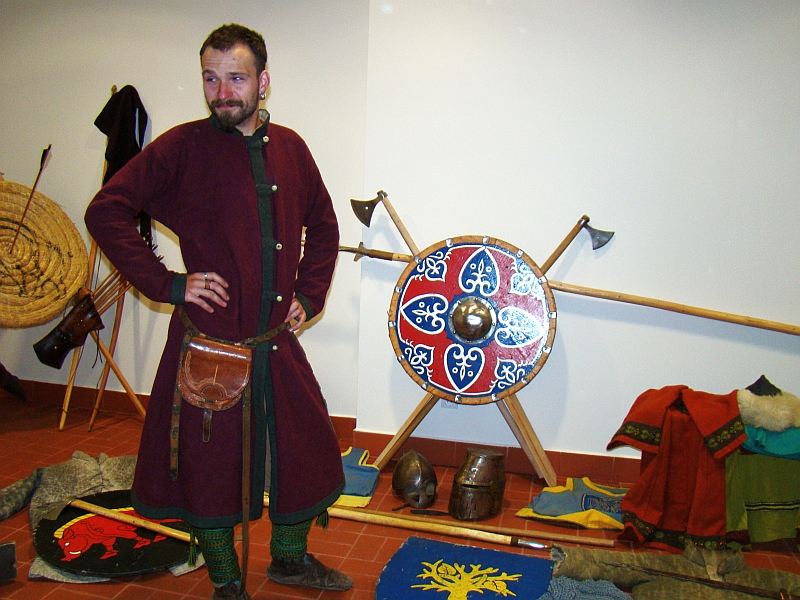
Collections and Exhibition

In 1937, an exhibition titled "Sanok Land in Painting, Sculpture, and Photography" was held. In 1945, the first post-war joint exhibition of Sanok artists was organized, featuring works by Stefan Pajączkowski, Marian Kruczek, Władysław Lisowski, Kazimierz Florek, Tadeusz Marian Turkowski, Bronisław Naczas, and Józef Sitarz.

The museum currently holds over 20,000 artifacts, organized into archaeological, iconographic, historical, and conservation departments. It includes the Maria and Franciszek Prochaska Contemporary Art Gallery and the Zdzisław Beksiński Gallery, located in the rebuilt southern wing of the Sanok Castle (2010–2011).

The collection "Pokuttia Ceramics from the Donation of Curator Aleksander Rybicki", housed in the Inn building, represents the largest collection of Pokuttia ceramics in Poland. Donated by Aleksander Rybicki on 28 May 1978, it was exhibited during the Sanok Days in June 1978. On 20 November 1978, the museum received works from the heirs of Polish artists Franciszek Prochaska, Tadeusz Makowski, Józef Pankiewicz, Hanna Rudzka-Cybisowa, and Jan Cybis.

The museum's most valuable collections include over 200 preserved Carpathian icons from the Sanok Land, dating from the 16th to 20th centuries, a collection of Pokuttia ceramics, and several hundred paintings by artists such as Jan Nepomucen Gniewosz, Maria Bianka Mossoczy, Wacław Zawadowski, Wacław Żaboklicki, Ludwik Lille, Józef Pankiewicz, Hanna Rudzka-Cybisowa, Jan Cybis, Olga Boznańska, Tadeusz Makowski, and Jan Ekiert.

In 1973, the museum acquired recipe books from the former pharmacy of Marian Kawski.

== Selected works from the museum's collections ==
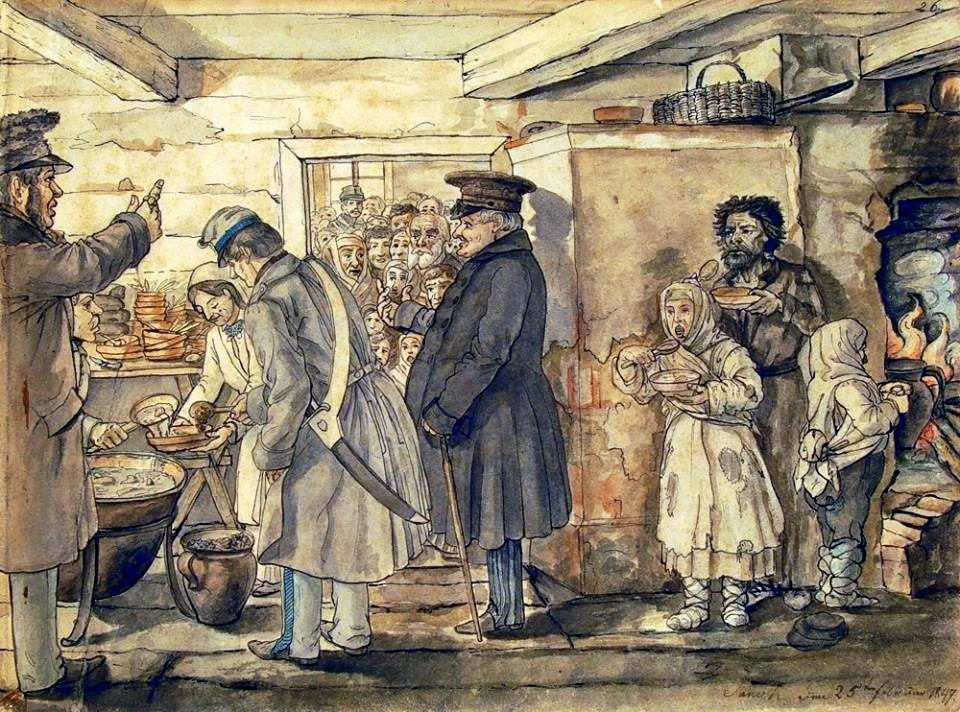
Jan Nepomucen Gniewosz, Distribution of Meals in Sanok, 24 October 1847

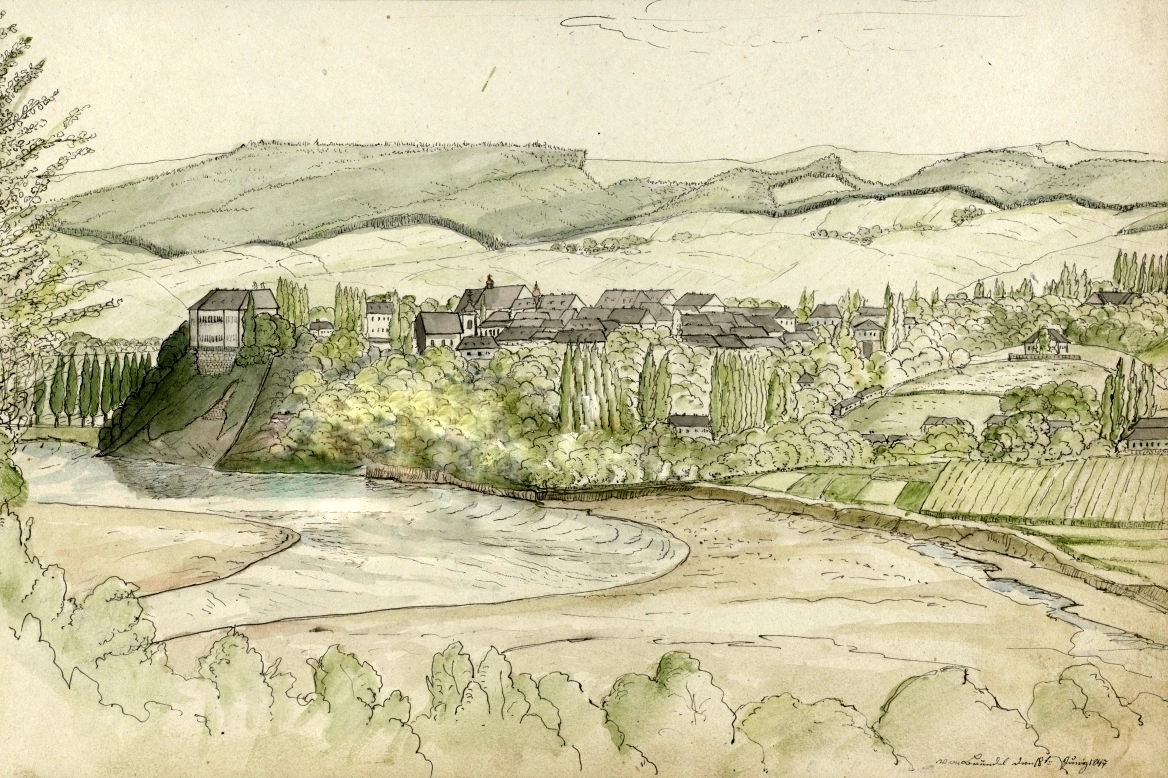
Jan Nepomucen Gniewosz, Watercolor of Sanok from 1847, view from Biała Góra and Olchowce village

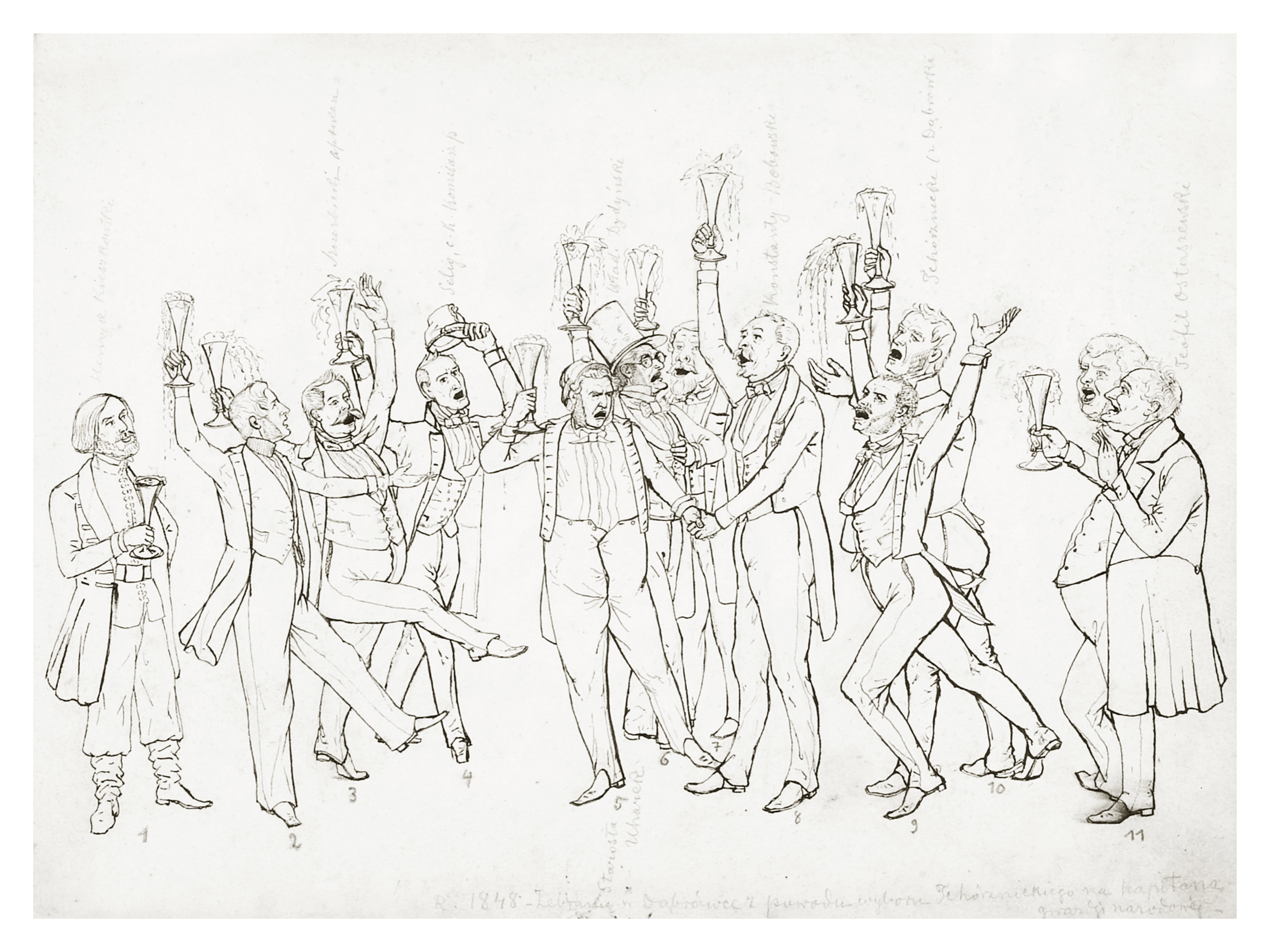
Drawing by Jan Nepomucen Gniewosz (1827–1892) from around 1860, commemorating the Spring of Nations in Galicia

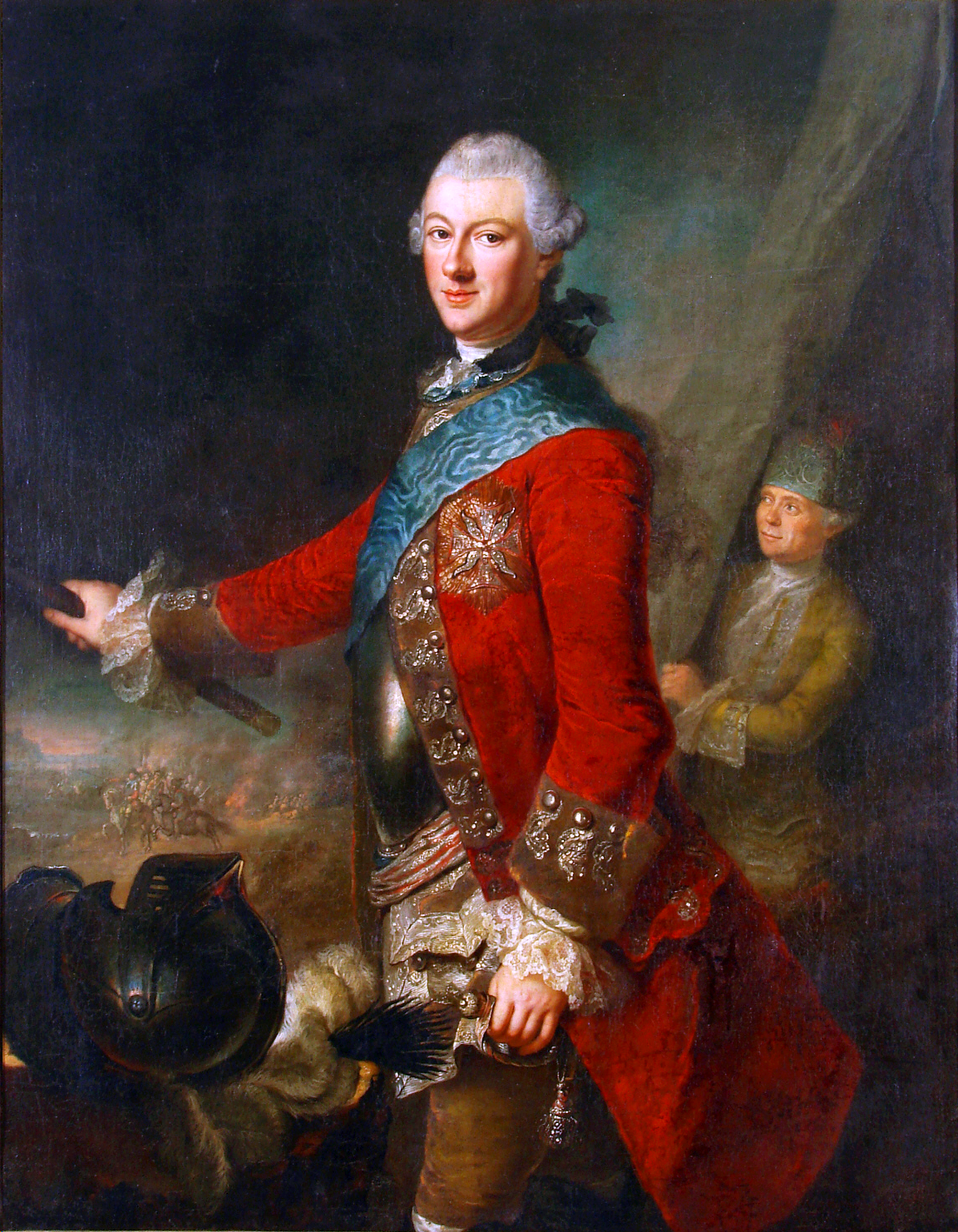
Anna Rosina de Gasc, Michał Kazimierz Ogiński

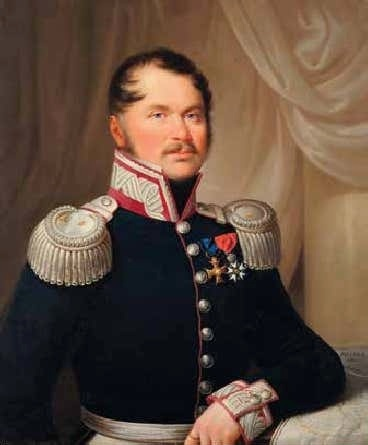
Marcin Jabłoński, Portrait of General Józef Bonawentura Załuski

== Awards and honors ==
- In 1974, a medal titled "40th Anniversary of the Historical Museum in Sanok" was minted, designed by Roman Tarkowski. In 1984, a medal titled "Historical Museum in Sanok: 50th Anniversary" was minted, designed by Czesław Dźwigaj. In 1986, two medals commemorating the Historical Museum in Sanok branch in Jabłonki, featuring General Karol Świerczewski, were minted, also designed by Czesław Dźwigaj.
- Honorary Diploma from the Minister of Culture and Art (1984).
- Badge "Meritorious for the Krosno Voivodeship" (1984).
- "Jubilee Address" (1984).
- Ministry of Culture and Art Award in the competition for the most interesting museum event of the year, for establishing the General Karol Świerczewski–Walter Memorial House exhibition (1988).
- Entry in the Golden Book of the Society of Fighters for Freedom and Democracy in Sanok (1989).
