= Popowice, Lesser Poland Voivodeship =

Popowice
- Village
- Location within Poland
- Coordinates: 49°32′23″N 20°39′47″E
- Country: Poland
- Voivodeship: Lesser Poland
- County: Nowy Sącz
- Gmina: Stary Sącz
- Population (approx.): 500

Popowice [pɔpɔˈvʲit͡sɛ] is a village in the administrative district of Gmina Stary Sącz, within Nowy Sącz County, Lesser Poland Voivodeship, in southern Poland.

The village has an approximate population of 500.
