= Wójtostwo, Sanok =

District of Sanok, Poland

Wójtostwo
- District
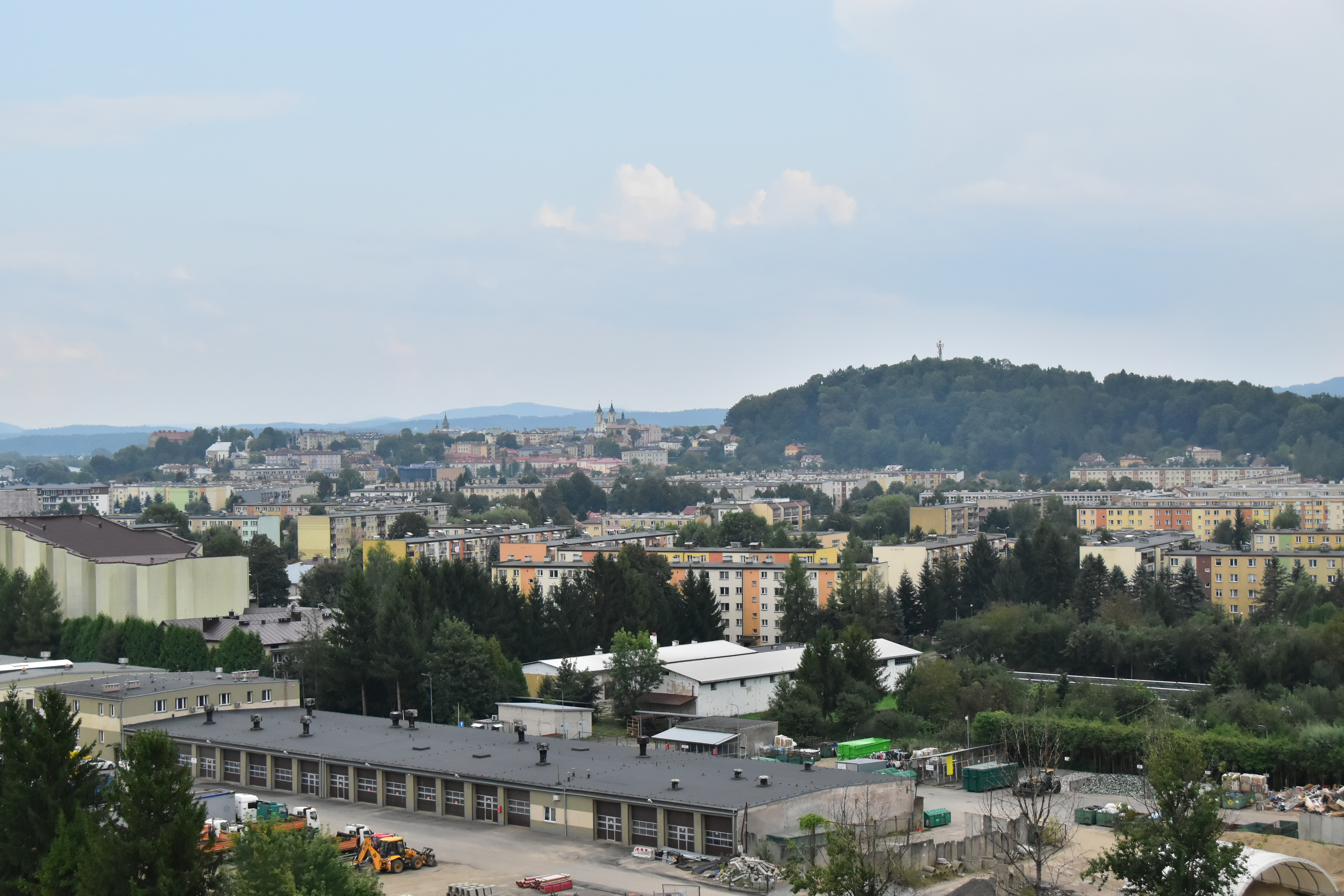
- View of the district from the hill in Trepcza in 2024, with Downtown in the background

- Location within Poland
- Coordinates: 49°34′15″N 22°11′49″E
- Country: Poland
- Voivodeship: Subcarpathian Voivodeship
- County: Sanok County
- City: Sanok
- Established: 19th century
- Incorporated into Sanok: 19th century

Wójtostwo is a district of Sanok, Poland.

== History ==
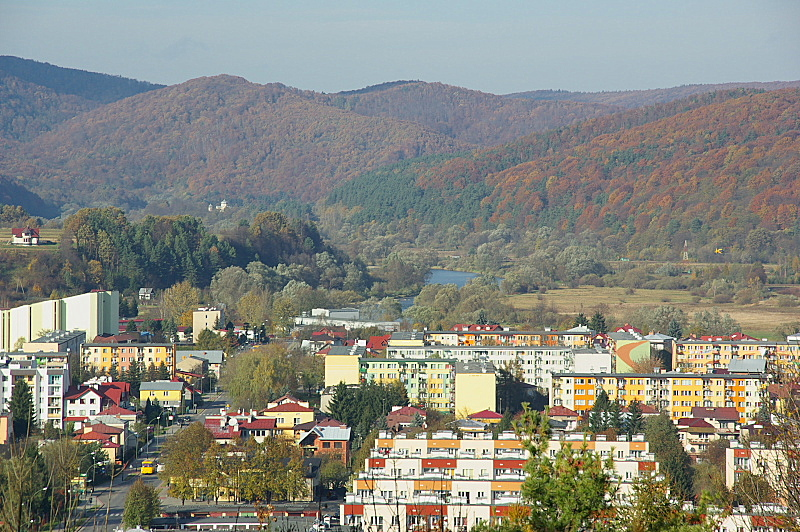
View of Wójtostwo from Parkowa Hill. On the left, the district's main artery, John Paul II Street. In the background, the San river and Słonne Mountains (2010)

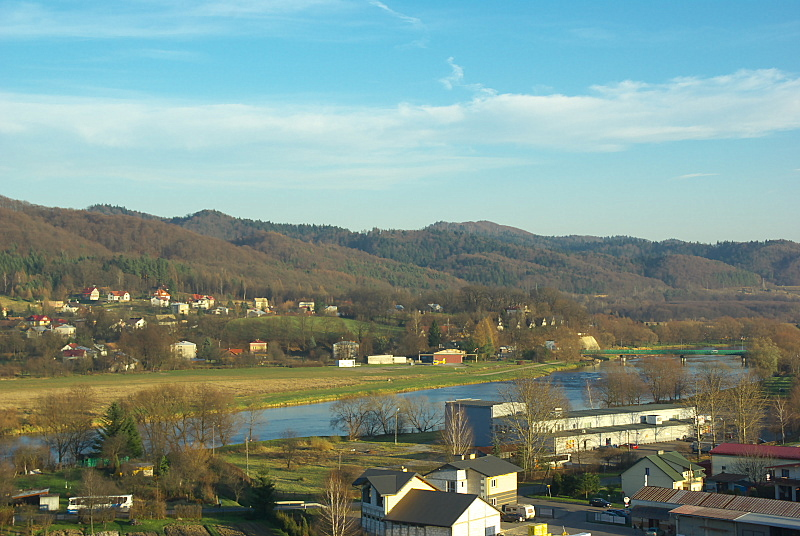
Northern part of Wójtostwo. In the background, the current bridge over the San river connecting to Biała Góra (2010)

Historically, under the 14th-century town charter, a hereditary wójt (local magistrate) governed Sanok. The district's name derives from a suburban area that housed the wójt's folwark (manor farm), which provided income for the Sanok wójts.

During the Hungarian Revolution of 1848, Russian troops passing through en route to Hungary demanded 100 korzec (a historical unit of volume) of oats, threatening to burn the town. Lacking both grain and funds, the town authorities transferred the Wójtostwo land to the local landowner Jan Tchorznicki in exchange for his oats. In the 19th century, the flat terrain of Wójtostwo was unsuitable for construction due to flood risks from the nearby San river. In 1879, Kornelia Tchórznicka resided in Wójtostwo. By the late 19th century, Józefa Rylska was the tabular estate owner of Wójtostwo. In 1897, the town established a new marketplace, slaughterhouse, and military grounds. Residential and municipal construction became feasible after river regulation and flood protection works. At the turn of the 19th and 20th centuries, Aleksander Mniszek-Tchorznicki owned the lands, including a brewery and granary.

Before 1939, a steam brickworks operated on Kiczura Street, owned by Antoni Wilk.

From 1959, a footbridge over the San river connected Wójtostwo (and Sanok) to Biała Góra on the right bank. Since 1977, and after reconstruction in 1981, the current Białogórski Bridge has connected the areas.

After 1960, former agricultural lands in the district were developed with residential blocks by the Sanok Housing Cooperative and Sanok Rubber Company. In the 1970s, construction of residential blocks occurred at Romuald Traugutt Street, undertaken by Sanok Construction Company. In 1989, a resolution by the Sanok City Council renamed the Traugutta estate to Wójtostwo and changed the main artery, Długa Street, to John Paul II Street.

Historically, the district's name appeared as "Wójtostwo" and "Wójtowstwo". The form "Wójtostwo" was used by scholars like Józef Sulisz, historian Adam Fastnacht, and Sanok expert Stefan Stefański. Due to an error in a 25 September 1991 city council resolution, "Wójtostwo" was mistakenly replaced with "Wójtowstwo", which remains in official documents and street signs.

On 1 January 2023, a 102-hectare area from the Trepcza village was incorporated into Sanok near Wójtostwo.

== Neighbourhoods ==
- Biała Góra (including the Museum of Folk Architecture)
- Jana Pawła II estate
- Sierakowski estate
- Sadowa estate
- Armii Krajowej estate
- Kiczura estate

== Schools ==
The district is home to the following schools:

- At 25 John Paul II Street: Primary School No. 7, opened on 1 September 1975. The building was constructed by Sanok Construction Company. It later housed Gymnasium No. 4, named after the 6th Pomeranian Infantry Division, and since the 2017 education reform, it has been Primary School No. 9.
- At 12 Sadowa Street: Primary School No. 8, opened in 1986, also built by Sanok Construction Company. In 2008, it was renamed Father Zdzisław Jastrzębiec Peszkowski Primary School No. 4.

== Facilities ==
A rectangular garden, approximately 2 hectares, bordered by John Paul II Street (formerly Długa Street), Marian Langiewicz Street, Romuald Traugutt Street, and Wiśniowa Street, was developed in the 1970s. Managed by the Bieszczady Housing Cooperative in Sanok, it was opened in 1978. The area previously belonged to the family of Franciszek Lurski.

== Bibliography ==
- Kiryk, Feliks, ed. (1995). Sanok. Dzieje miasta [Sanok: History of the City] (in Polish). Kraków: Secesja. ISBN 83-86077-57-3.
