= Gmina Stary Sącz =

Gmina Stary Sącz Stary Sącz Commune
- Gmina
- Flag Coat of arms
- Interactive map of Gmina Stary Sącz
- Coordinates (Stary Sącz): 49°33′45″N 20°38′11″E
- Country: Poland
- Voivodeship: Lesser Poland
- County: Nowy Sącz County
- Seat: Stary Sącz

Area
  - Total: 102.41 km^{2} (39.54 sq mi)

Population (2006)
  - Total: 22,206
  - Density: 216.83/km^{2} (561.60/sq mi)
  - Urban: 8,987
  - Rural: 13,219
- Website: http://www.stary.sacz.pl

Gmina Stary Sącz is an urban-rural gmina (administrative district) in Nowy Sącz County, Lesser Poland Voivodeship, in southern Poland. Its seat is the town of Stary Sącz, which lies approximately 9 kilometres (6 mi) south-west of Nowy Sącz and 75 km (47 mi) south-east of the regional capital Kraków.

The gmina covers an area of 102.41 square kilometres (39.5 sq mi), and as of 2006 its total population is 22,206 (of which the population of Stary Sącz amounts to 8,987, and the population of the rural part of the gmina is 13,219).

== Villages ==
Apart from the town of Stary Sącz, Gmina Stary Sącz contains the villages and settlements of Barcice Dolne, Barcice Górne, Gaboń, Gaboń-Praczka, Gołkowice Dolne, Gołkowice Górne, Łazy Biegonickie, Mostki, Moszczenica Niżna, Moszczenica Wyżna, Myślec, Popowice, Przysietnica, Skrudzina and Wola Krogulecka.

== Neighbouring gminas ==
Gmina Stary Sącz is bordered by the towns of Nowy Sącz and Szczawnica, and by the gminas of Łącko, Nawojowa, Podegrodzie and Rytro.
