= Łazy Biegonickie =

- Village
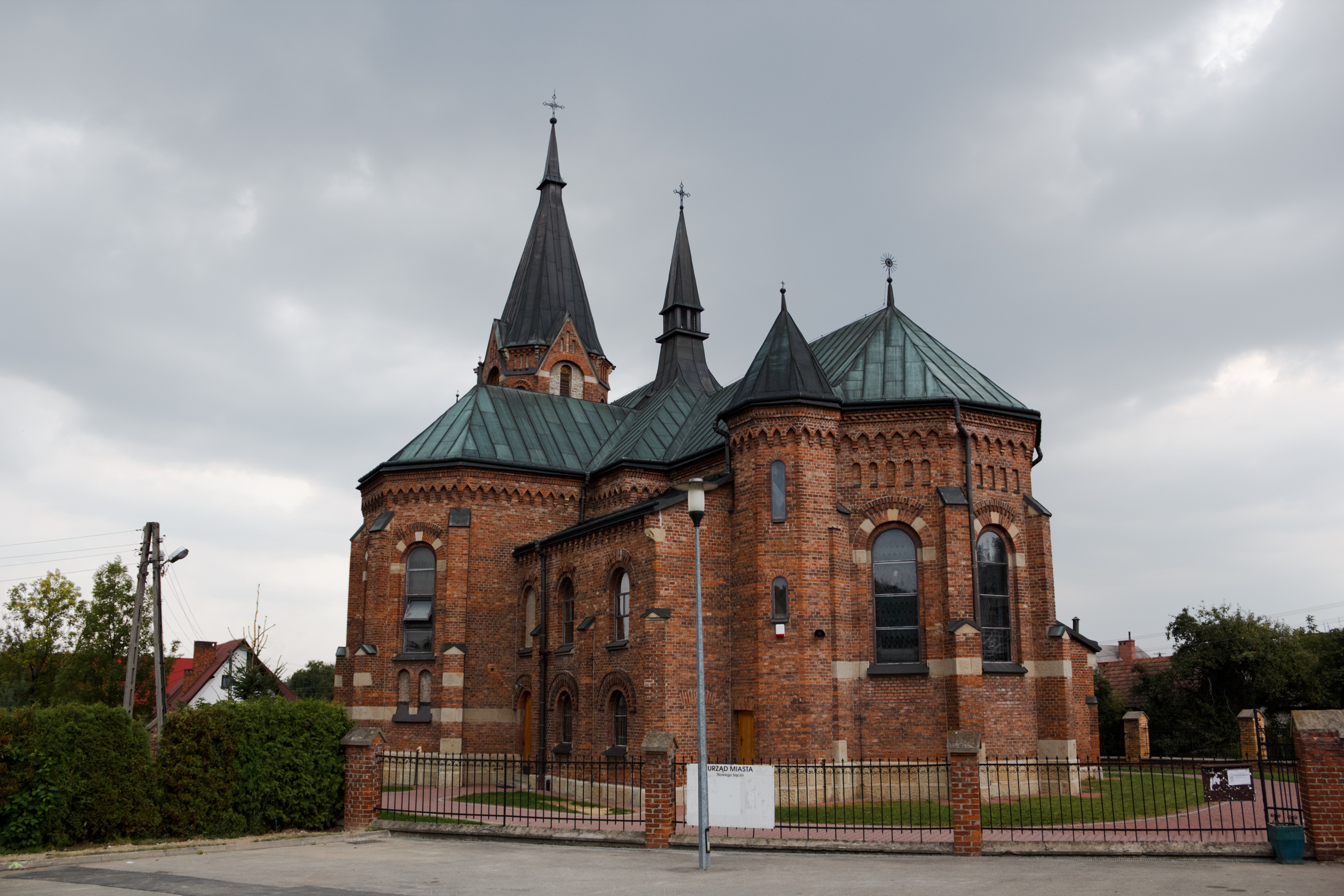
- St. Lawrence church

- Location within Poland
- Coordinates: 49°33′58″N 20°41′10″E
- Country: Poland
- Voivodeship: Lesser Poland
- County: Nowy Sącz
- Gmina: Stary Sącz

Łazy Biegonickie [ˈwazɨ bʲɛɡɔˈɲit͡skʲɛ] is a village in the administrative district of Gmina Stary Sącz, within Nowy Sącz County, Lesser Poland Voivodeship, in southern Poland.
