= Gołkowice Górne =

- Village
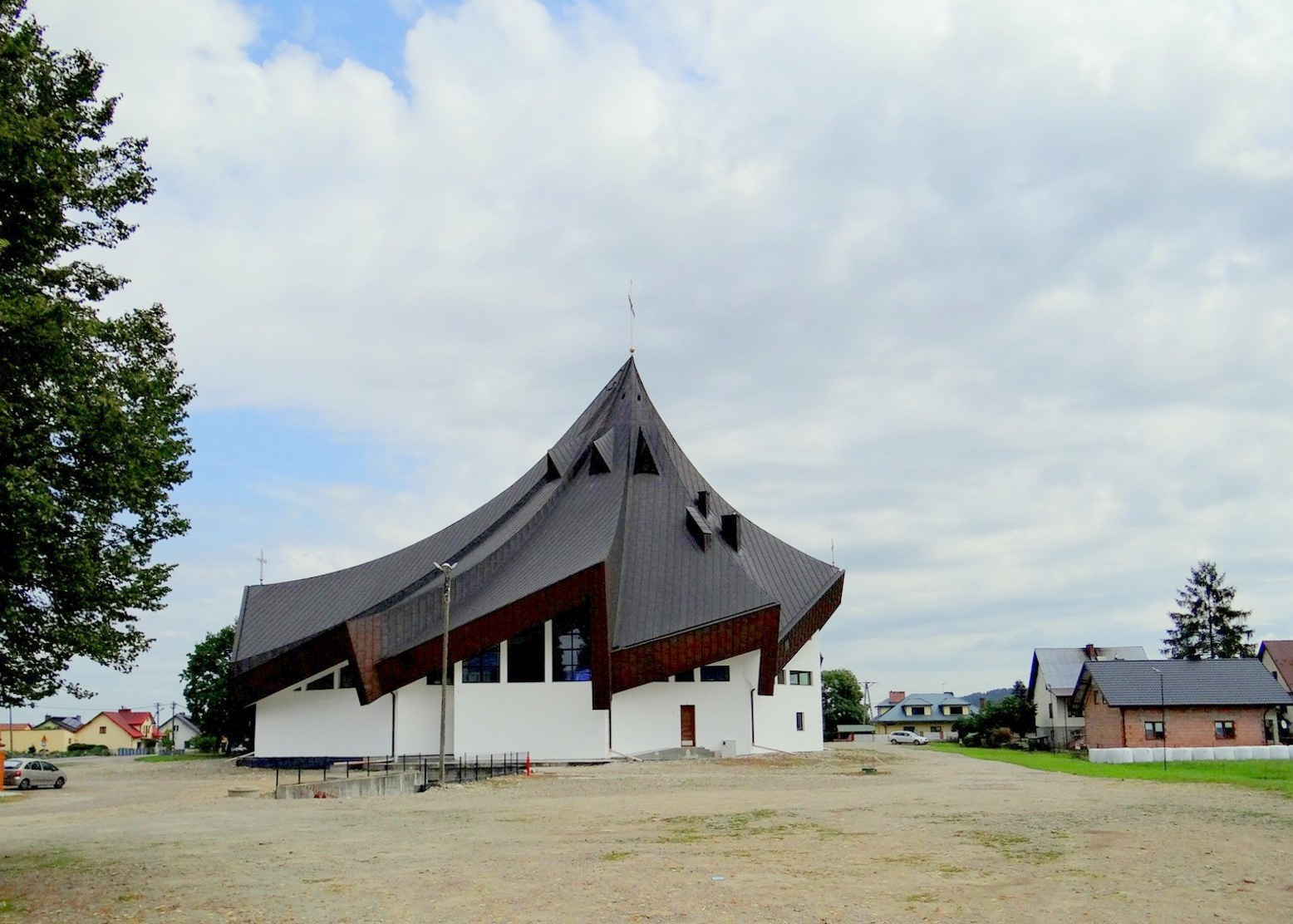
- Catholic church

- Location within Poland
- Coordinates: 49°32′12″N 20°34′36″E
- Country: Poland
- Voivodeship: Lesser Poland
- County: Nowy Sącz
- Gmina: Stary Sącz
- Elevation: 320 m (1,050 ft)
- Population: 810

Gołkowice Górne [ɡɔu̯kɔˈvʲit͡sɛ ˈɡurnɛ] is a village in the administrative district of Gmina Stary Sącz, within Nowy Sącz County, Lesser Poland Voivodeship, in southern Poland.
