= Barcice Dolne =

- Village
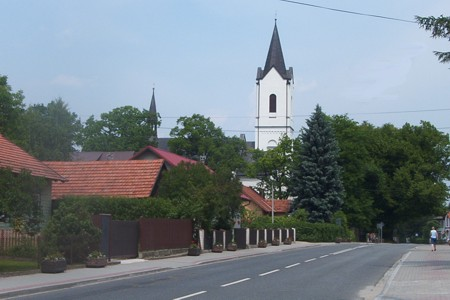
- Village centre with the church

- Location within Poland
- Coordinates: 49°31′39″N 20°39′6″E
- Country: Poland
- Voivodeship: Lesser Poland
- County: Nowy Sącz
- Gmina: Stary Sącz
- Established: 1910
- Elevation: 325 m (1,066 ft)
- Population (approx.): 670

Barcice Dolne (Polish pronunciation: [barˈt͡ɕit͡sɛ ˈdɔlnɛ]) is a village in the administrative district of Gmina Stary Sącz, within Nowy Sącz County, Lesser Poland Voivodeship, in southern Poland.

The village has an approximate population of 670. The village was established in 1910 after separation from Barcice (Górne).
