= Skrudzina =

- Village
- Location within Poland
- Coordinates: 49°31′20″N 20°34′48″E
- Country: Poland
- Voivodeship: Lesser Poland
- County: Nowy Sącz
- Gmina: Stary Sącz
- Population: 410

Skrudzina [skruˈd͡ʑina] is a village in the administrative district of Gmina Stary Sącz, within Nowy Sącz County, Lesser Poland Voivodeship, in southern Poland.
