= Barcice, Lesser Poland Voivodeship =

Barcice
- Village
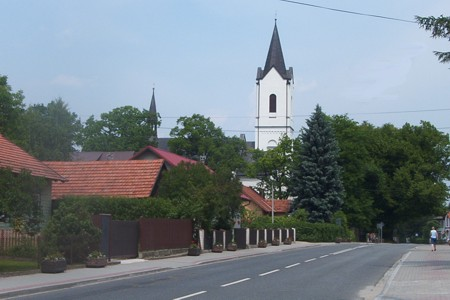
- Road through the village

- Location within Poland
- Coordinates: 49°31′9″N 20°39′6″E
- Country: Poland
- Voivodeship: Lesser Poland
- County: Nowy Sącz
- Gmina: Stary Sącz
- Elevation: 325 m (1,066 ft)

Barcice (Polish pronunciation: [barˈt͡ɕit͡sɛ]; until 2011 Barcice Górne [barˈt͡ɕit͡sɛ ˈɡurnɛ]) is a village in the administrative district of Gmina Stary Sącz, within Nowy Sącz County, Lesser Poland Voivodeship, in southern Poland.

The biggest landmark in the village is the Saint Mary church build in 1901. In 1910 the village of Barcice Dolne was separated from Barcice (thence until 2011 known as Barcice Górne).
