= Wola Krogulecka =

- Village
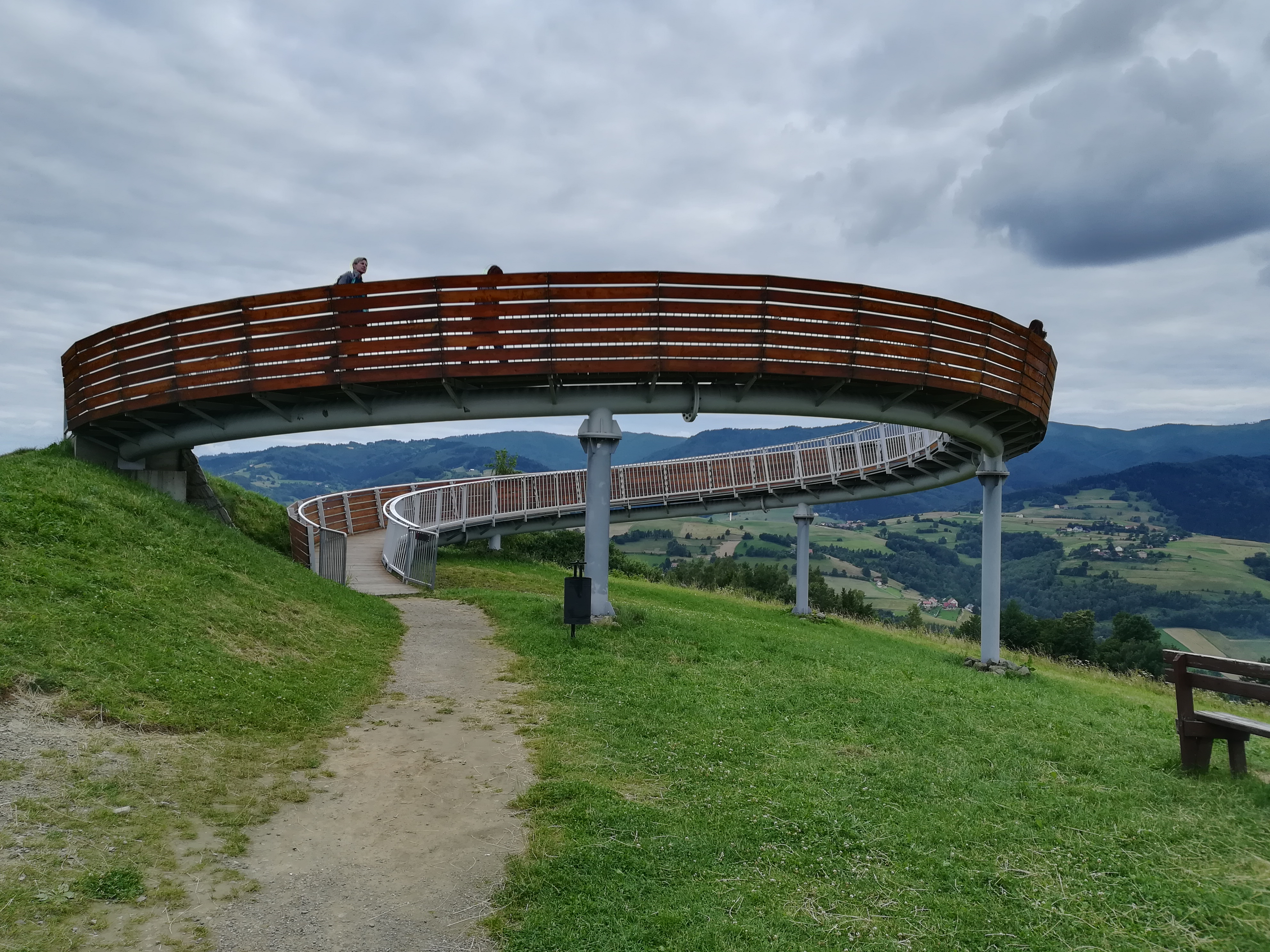
- Observation platform

- Location within Poland
- Coordinates: 49°30′50″N 20°40′6″E
- Country: Poland
- Voivodeship: Lesser Poland
- County: Nowy Sącz
- Gmina: Stary Sącz
- Population (approx.): 420

Wola Krogulecka [ˈvɔla krɔɡuˈlɛt͡ska] is a village in the administrative district of Gmina Stary Sącz, within Nowy Sącz County, Lesser Poland Voivodeship, in southern Poland.

The village has an approximate population of 420.
