= Gaboń-Praczka =

- Village
- Location within Poland
- Coordinates: 49°30′45″N 20°34′9″E
- Country: Poland
- Voivodeship: Lesser Poland
- County: Nowy Sącz
- Gmina: Stary Sącz

Gaboń-Praczka [ˈɡabɔɲ ˈprat͡ʂka] is a village in the administrative district of Gmina Stary Sącz, within Nowy Sącz County, Lesser Poland Voivodeship, in southern Poland.
