= Mostki, Lesser Poland Voivodeship =

Mostki
- Village
- Location within Poland
- Coordinates: 49°33′21″N 20°35′39″E
- Country: Poland
- Voivodeship: Lesser Poland
- County: Nowy Sącz
- Gmina: Stary Sącz
- Elevation: 320 m (1,050 ft)
- Population: 570

Mostki [ˈmɔstkʲi] is a village in the administrative district of Gmina Stary Sącz, within Nowy Sącz County, Lesser Poland Voivodeship, in southern Poland.
