= Myślec =

- Village
- Location within Poland
- Coordinates: 49°32′49″N 20°39′34″E
- Country: Poland
- Voivodeship: Lesser Poland
- County: Nowy Sącz
- Gmina: Stary Sącz
- Population: 140

Myślec [ˈmɨɕlɛt͡s] is a village in the administrative district of Gmina Stary Sącz, within Nowy Sącz County, Lesser Poland Voivodeship, in southern Poland.
