= Moszczenica Niżna =

- Village
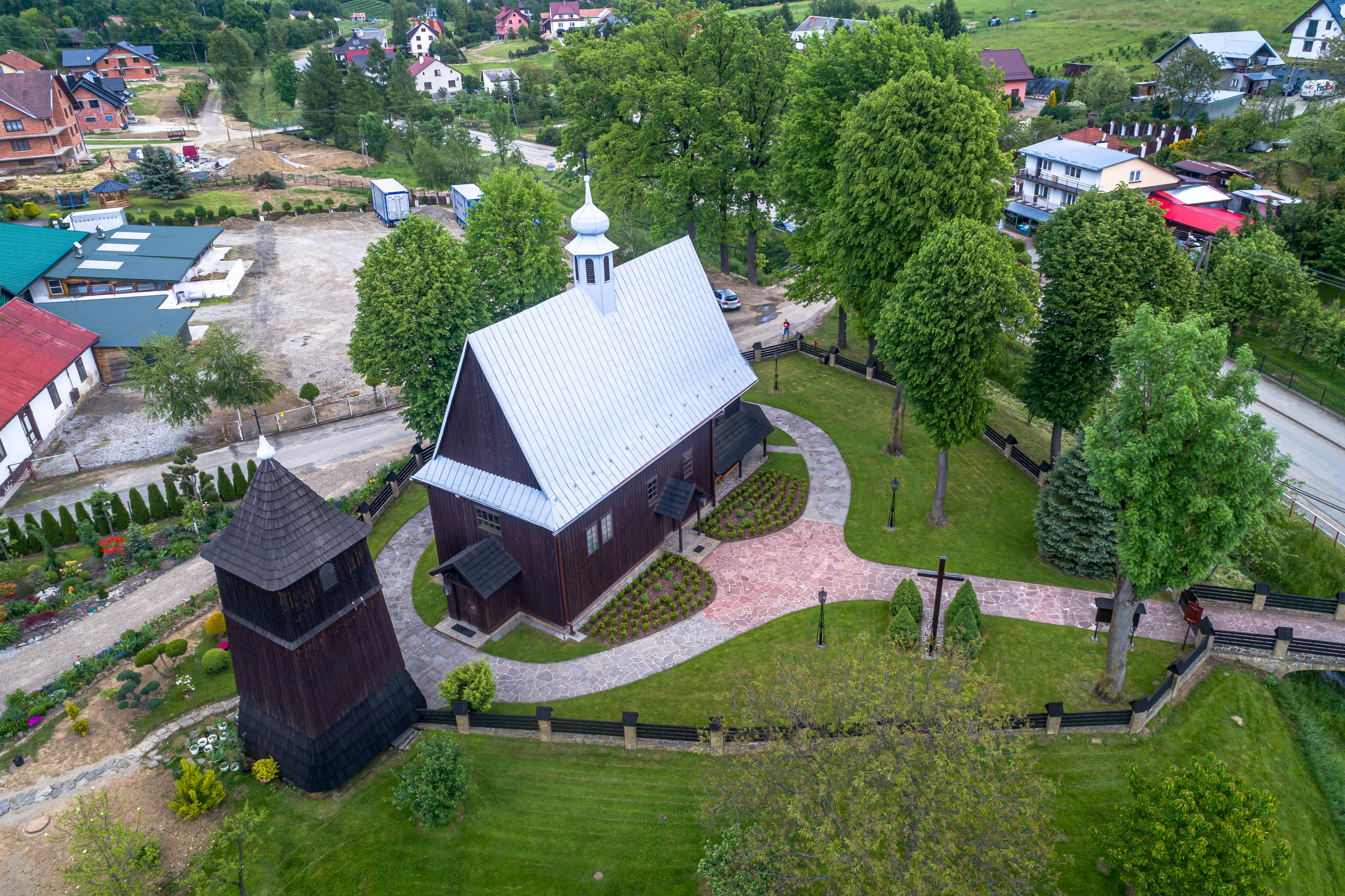
- St. Nicholas church

- Location within Poland
- Coordinates: 49°32′46″N 20°37′9″E
- Country: Poland
- Voivodeship: Lesser Poland
- County: Nowy Sącz
- Gmina: Stary Sącz
- Elevation: 240 m (790 ft)
- Population: 860

Moszczenica Niżna [mɔʂt͡ʂɛˈɲit͡sa ˈɲiʐna] is a village in the administrative district of Gmina Stary Sącz, within Nowy Sącz County, Lesser Poland Voivodeship, in southern Poland.

1799 a small German settlement was established by Joseph II (Morawina, German Morau) in the northern part of the village.
