= Sanok Castle =

Coordinates: 49°33′44″N 22°12′33″E

Sanok Royal Castle
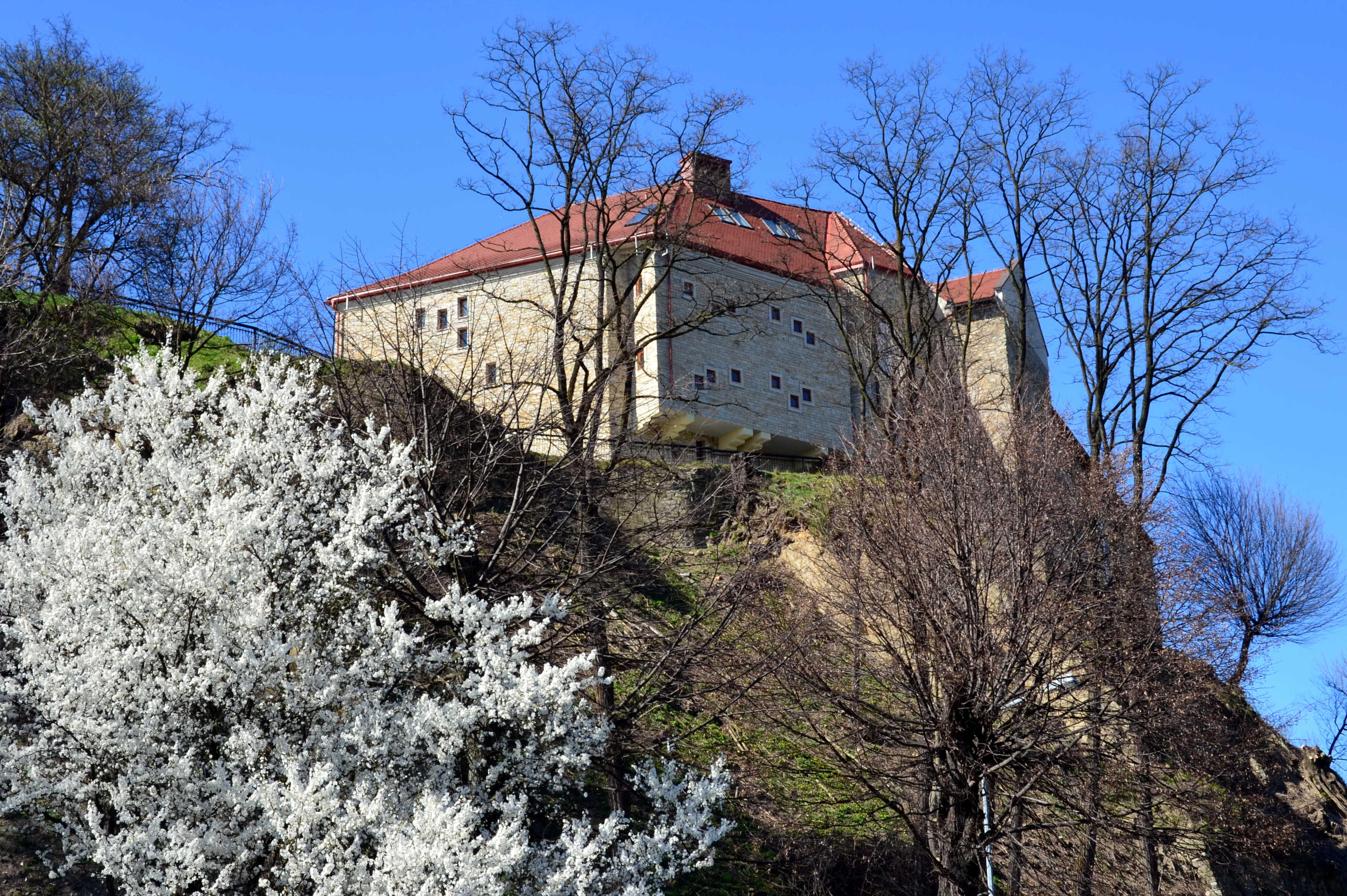
- Interactive map of the Sanok Royal Castle area

General information
- Architectural style: Polish Gothic-Renaissance
- Location: Sanok, Poland
- Construction started: 14th century
- Completed: 2010
- Demolished: 1915 (south wing)
- Client: Casimir III the Great

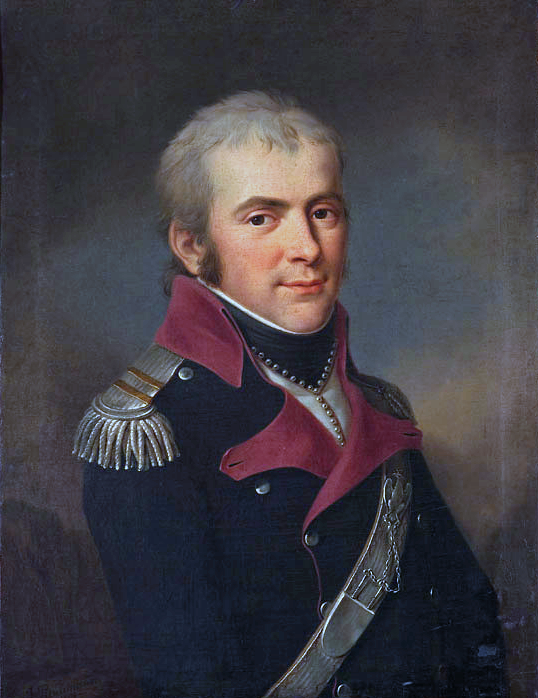
Gen. Franciszek Ksawery Krasicki defended the castle against the Austrians in 1809

The Sanok Royal Castle was built in the late 14th century in Sanok, Poland. The castle is situated on a steep slope, at 317 m above sea level, overlooking the San River. Today it is the seat of the Sanok Historical Museum.

== History ==
The first mention of Sanok is found in 12th-century chronicles. The stronghold was destroyed in the 13th century during the Tatar invasion in 1241. In the 14th century the town of Sanok became fortified and a defensive castle was built.

The earliest mention of the stronghold comes from 1150 and was written in the Hypatian Codex. The Ruthenian chronicler describes the expedition of King Géza II of Hungary to Ruthenia and the capture of the towns of Przemyśl and Sanok. In the time of the Piast dynasty, after the recovery of the Red Ruthenia by King Casimir III the Great, the royal palace surrounded by a defensive wall was built on the hilltop.

During the reign of King Władysław Jagiełło, his wedding with Elisabeth of Pilica took place at the castle on May 2, 1417. The town and district authorities with a castellan at the top had their seat at the Sanok castle. In 1425, it was established the Higher Court of German law at the Sanok Castle. It was also a residence of the King's fourth wife Sophia of Halshany until her death in 1461. Queen Bona Sforza ordered the rebuilding of the Gothic castle in the Renaissance style between 1523 and 1548. In 1555 and 1556, the castle was the seat of Isabella Jagiellon, Queen of Hungary, after her escape from Transylvania. At the end of the 16th century, the castle underwent further expansion: the south wing was built at that time. At the turn of the 18th century the north wing was added. During the Napoleonic Wars, the castle was successfully defended against the Austrian forces by General Franciszek Ksawery Krasicki, who was the leader of the anti-Austrian uprising in the Sanok Region.

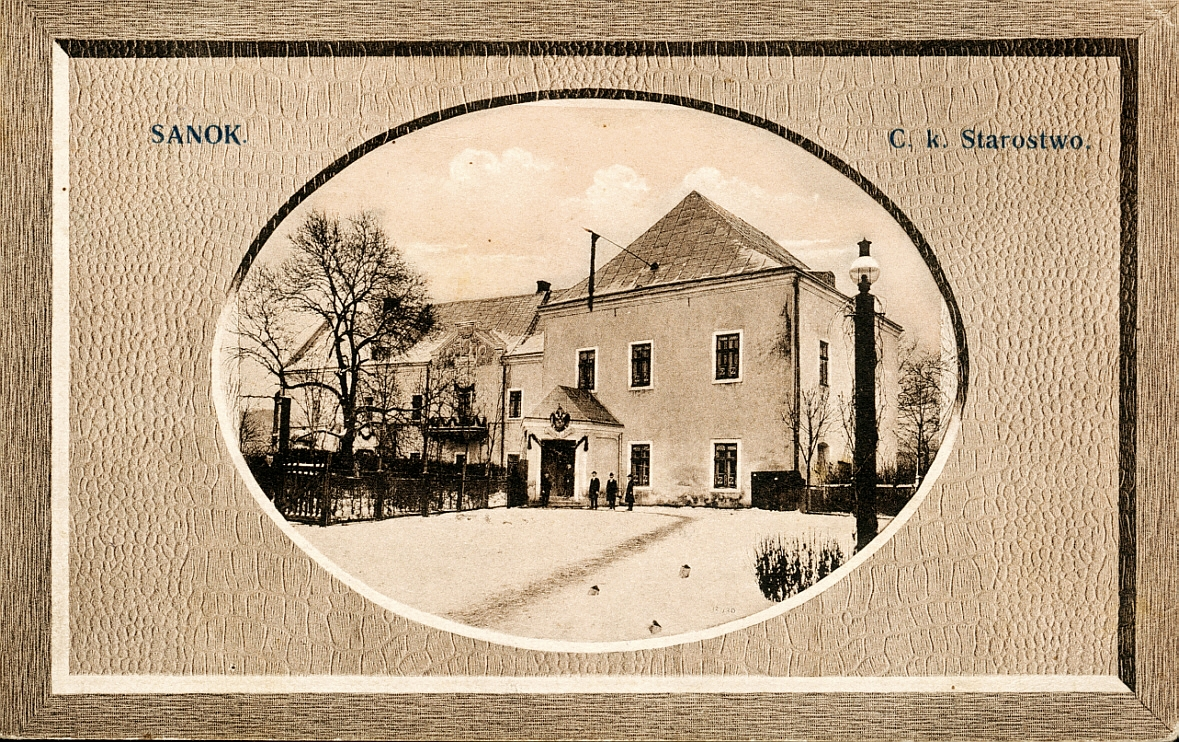
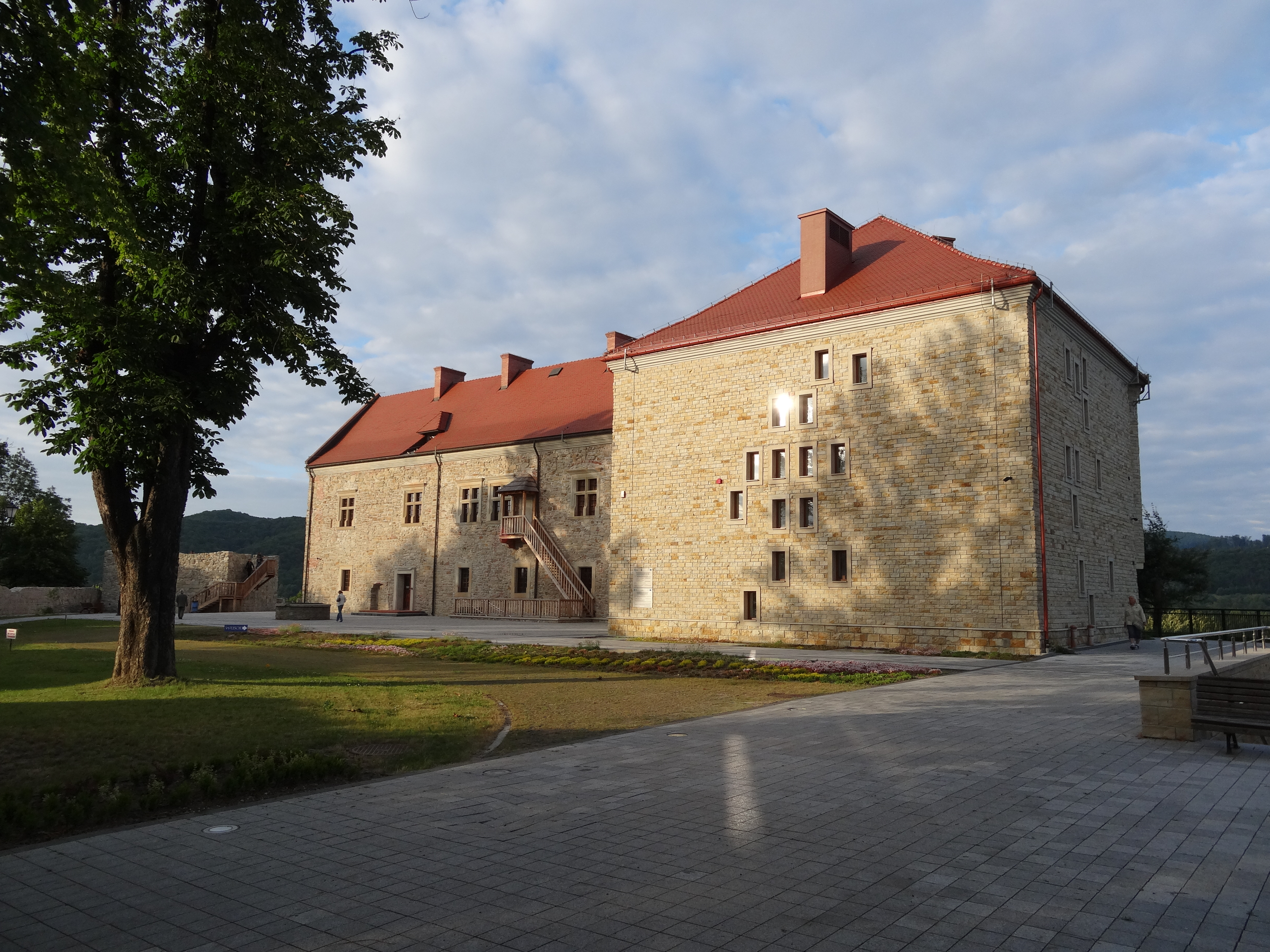
Top: Die K.u.k. Starostei in southern wing of the Sanok Castle (before 1914); Bottom: Sanok Castle in 2014

In 1915, after the Russian invasion, the south wing was demolished. In the interwar period the castle served as the Museum of Sanok. The museum, established in 1934 by the Society of Friends of the Region of Sanok, had at first collections of the Sanok region, weapons and arms — the history of the town and castle of Sanok, furniture, artistic craftsmanship. With the beginning of World War II in September 1939, the castle was ransacked. In August 1944, the local German authorities looted the oldest surviving monuments of Polish culture, some of which were retrieved by the Polish Government after the war. Its collections were transferred to the castle where, since 1945, they have formed part of the Historical Museum, added to the latter's collection are some 200 icons from Lemko villages.

=== Castellans and starosts of Sanok ===
Starting from the 14th century the castle was the seat of a castellan and since 1352 also a seat of starosta:

- His Great and Mighty Grace Mikołaj Błociszewski (d. 1419) Castellan of Sanok (1401–1415),
- HGMG Sebastian Lubomirski (d.1558) Starost of Sanok (1553–1558),
- HGMG Jan Herburt (1524–1578) Castellan of Sanok (1572, 1573),
- HGMG Stanisław Bonifacy Mniszech (1580–1644) Starost of Sanok (1602),
- HGMG Zygmunt Fredro (d.1663) Castellan of Sanok (1652–1661),
- HGMG Franciszek Szembek (d.1693) Castellan of Sanok (1685–1688).

== The Zdzisław Beksiński Gallery ==
The Zdzisław Beksiński Subcarpathian Modern Art Center, short Beksiński Gallery, (Polish: Podkarpackie Centrum Sztuki Współczesnej im. Zdzisława Beksińskiego). The Historical Museum in Sanok possesses the largest collection of works by Zdzisław Beksiński. From May 19, 2012, his paintings, drawings, sculptures, photographs and engravings will be displayed in a space especially created for this purpose, in the reconstructed wing of Sanok Castle.

Old views of the castle

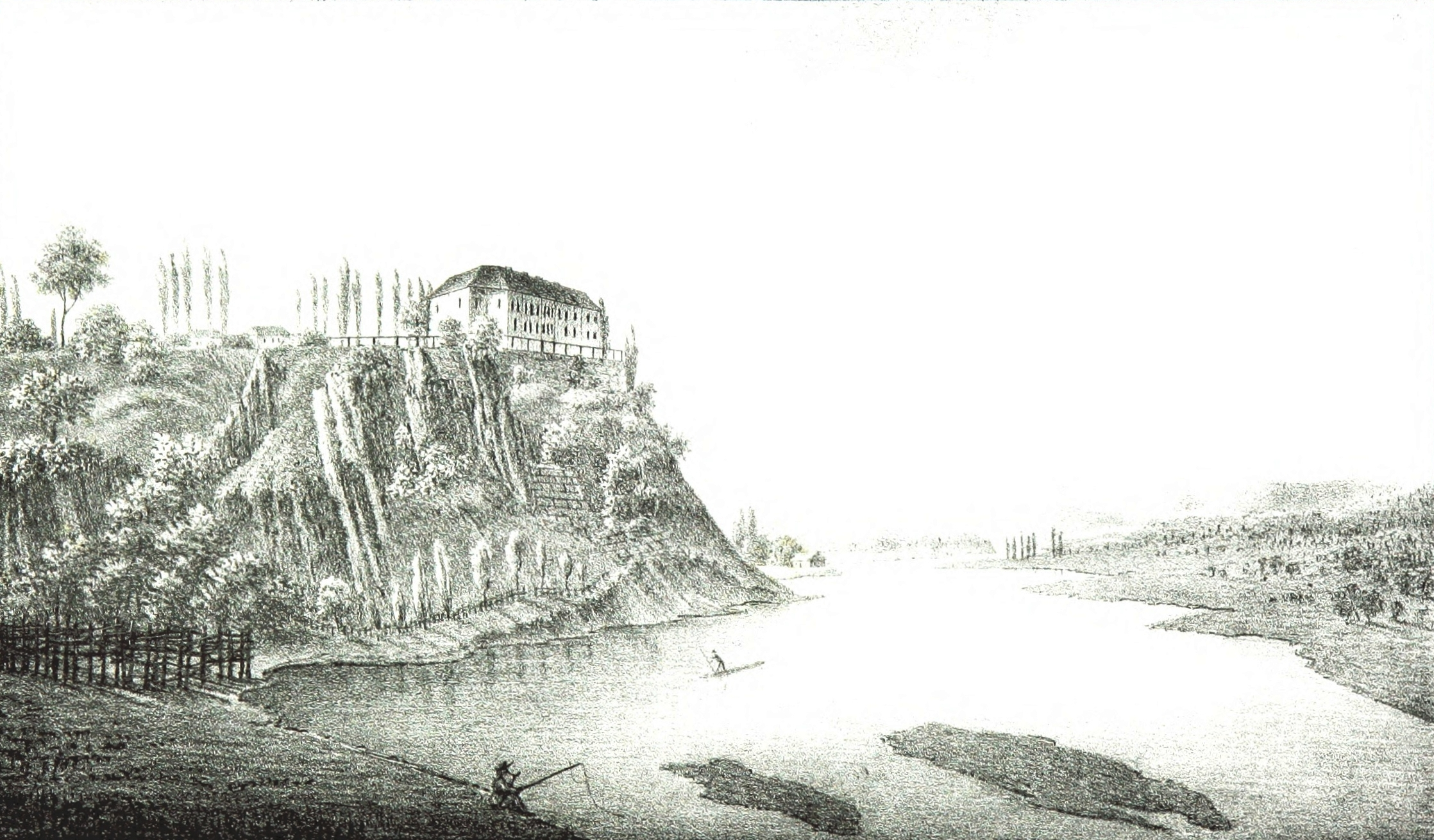
1847

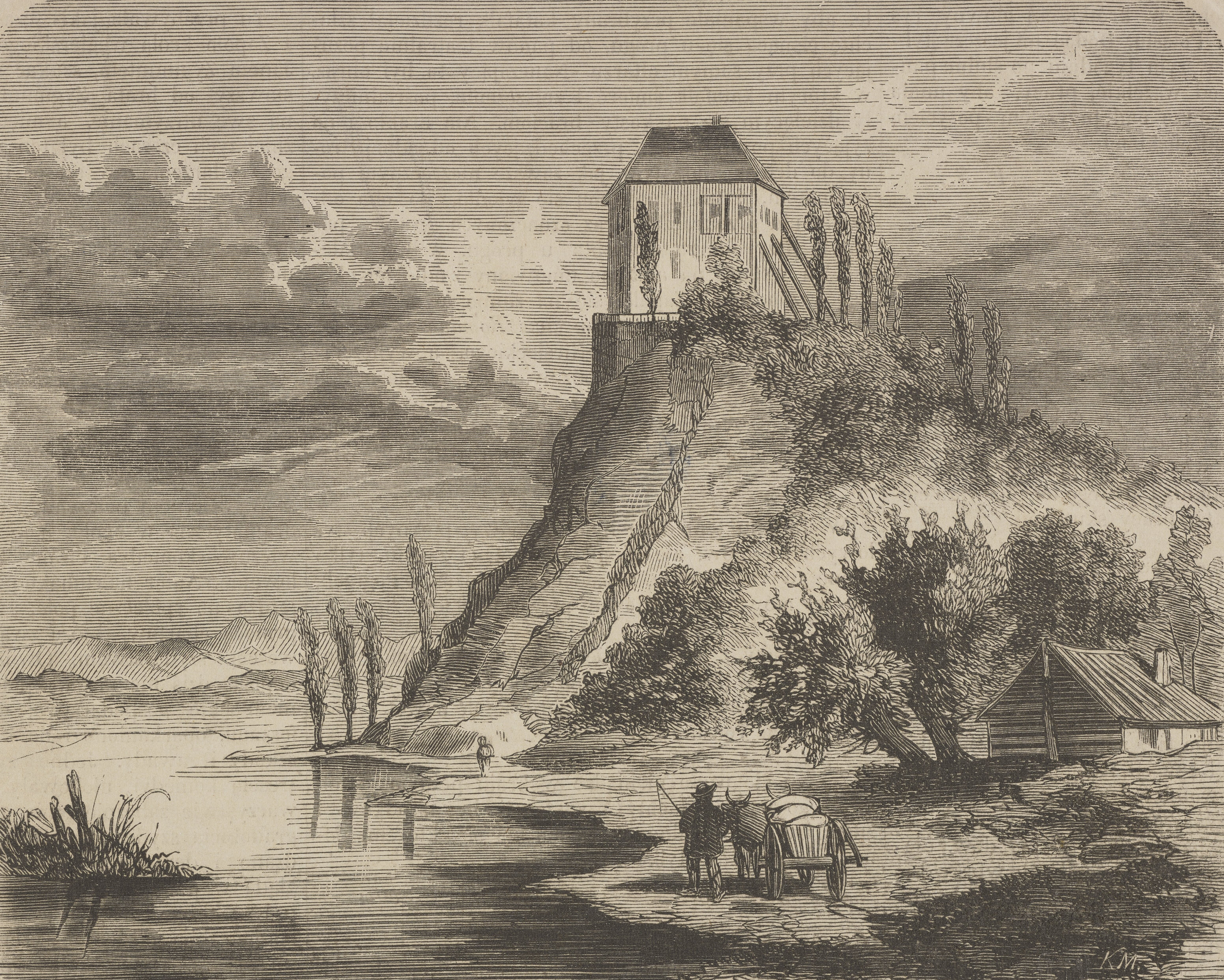
1863

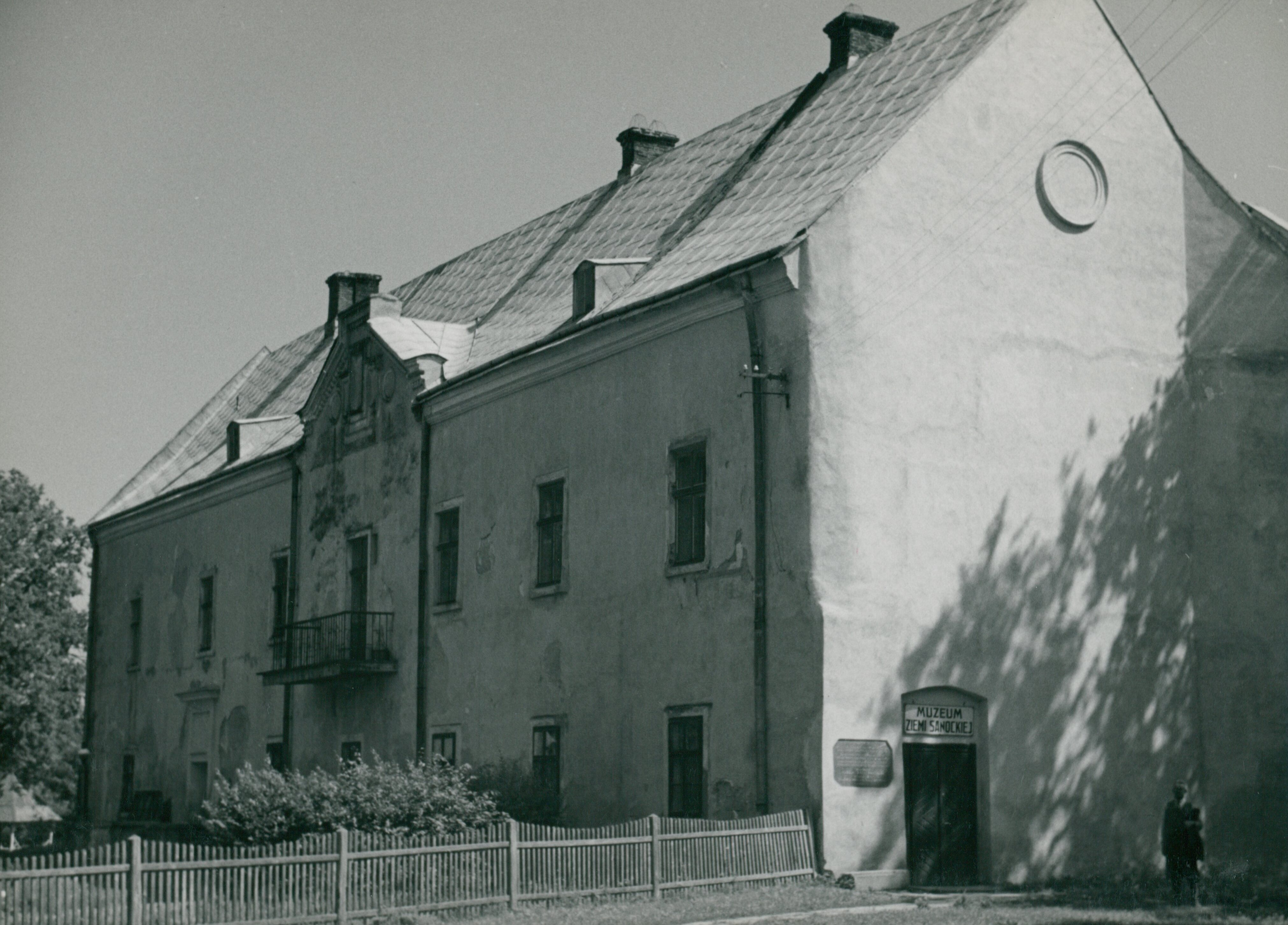
Before 1936

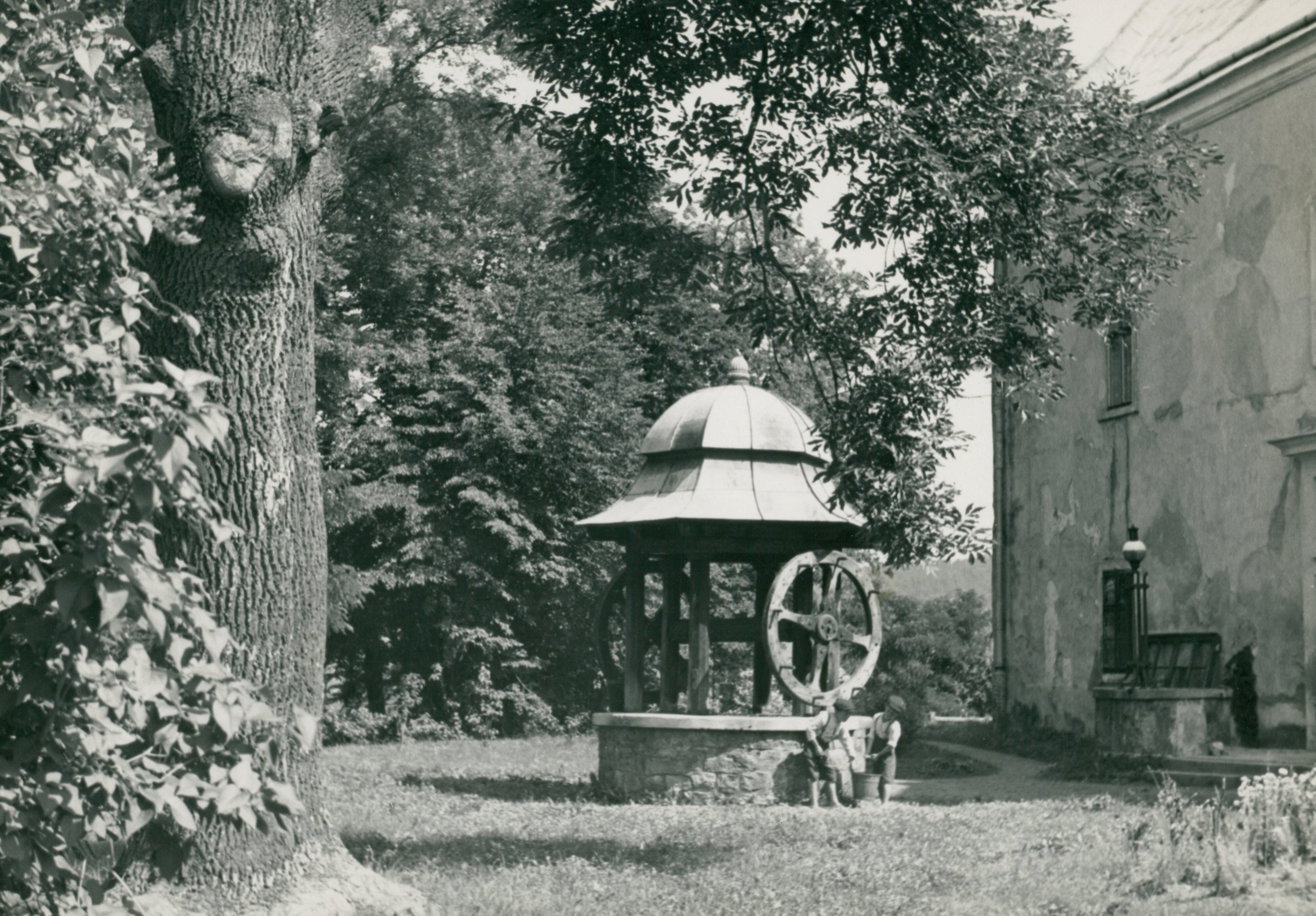
Before 1936

== See also ==
- Castles in Poland
