= Gaboń =

- Village
- Location within Poland
- Coordinates: 49°32′1″N 20°33′38″E
- Country: Poland
- Voivodeship: Lesser Poland
- County: Nowy Sącz
- Gmina: Stary Sącz
- Highest elevation: 700 m (2,300 ft)
- Lowest elevation: 340 m (1,120 ft)
- Population: 1,300

Gaboń [ˈɡabɔɲ] is a village in the administrative district of Gmina Stary Sącz, within Nowy Sącz County, Lesser Poland Voivodeship, in southern Poland.
