= Przysietnica, Lesser Poland Voivodeship =

Przysietnica
- Village
- Library in Przysietnica

- Location within Poland
- Coordinates: 49°30′48″N 20°37′28″E
- Country: Poland
- Voivodeship: Lesser Poland
- County: Nowy Sącz
- Gmina: Stary Sącz

Population (2013)
  - Total: 2,055
- Time zone: UTC+1 (CET)
  - Summer (DST): UTC+2 (CEST)
- Vehicle registration: KNS

Przysietnica [ˈɡabɔɲ] is a village in the administrative district of Gmina Stary Sącz, within Nowy Sącz County, Lesser Poland Voivodeship, in southern Poland.

== History ==
The village was granted by Kinga of Poland, wife of Bolesław V the Chaste, to the Poor Clares from Stary Sącz.

Following the German-Soviet invasion of Poland, which started World War II in September 1939, the village was occupied by Germany until 1945. The Polish resistance was present in the area. In 1944 the Peasant Battalions seized grain from a local storehouse as part of a nationwide effort to prevent the Germans from shipping food out of Poland.
