= John III Sobieski Street =

Street in the Downtown district of Sanok, Poland

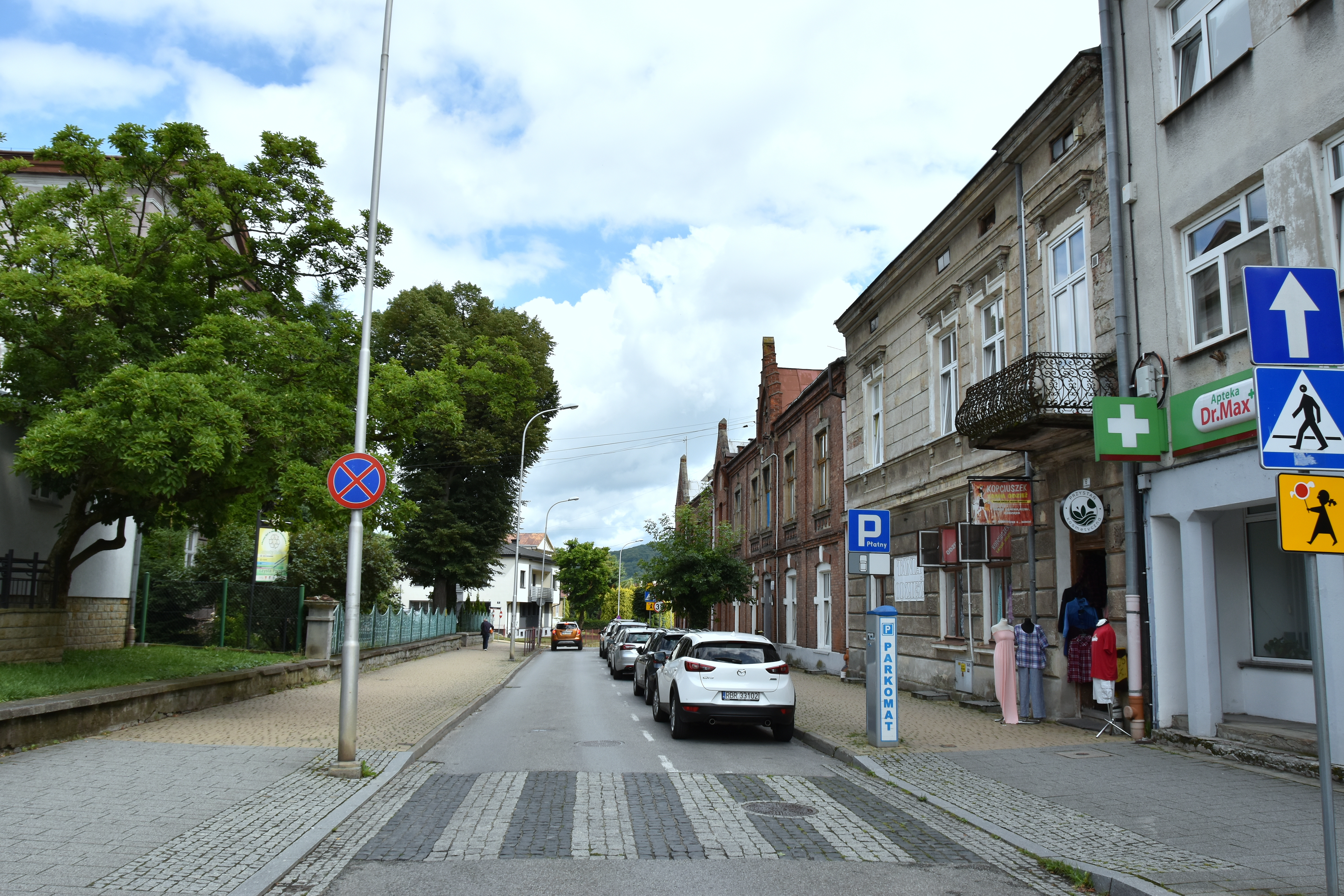
- Former name(s): Zielona, Jarosław Dąbrowski, Sobieskistrasse, Kasernenstrasse
- Location: Sanok, Subcarpathian Voivodeship, Poland
- Coordinates: 49°33′45.5″N 22°12′18″E

John III Sobieski Street is a street in the Downtown district of Sanok. It runs northward from the intersection with Józef Piłsudski Street to Zamkowa Street.

== History ==
Originally named Zielona Street, it underwent significant reconstruction in the late 1870s and early 1880s, involving widening and land acquisition managed by Esig Herzig under the supervision of engineer Henryk Stoy. During the construction of the C. K. Gymnasium, the Sanok Municipal Council, on 8 February 1883, designated Zielona Street as a municipal road. The street's regulation plan was approved on 5 April 1883.

On 2 August 1883, to commemorate the 200th anniversary of the Battle of Vienna (12 September 1683), the Municipal Council renamed the street after John III Sobieski at the citizens' request. On 6 September 1883, a ceremony was planned for 11 September 1883, during which a commemorative plaque was installed. In 1913, the street was incorporated into the Downtown district.

During World War II, under German occupation, the street was renamed Sobieskistrasse and later Kasernenstrasse. It bordered the Sanok Ghetto to the west. In 1944, during Eastern Front battles in Sanok, the street was a combat zone, with German forces defending the gymnasium building and burning the northern post office building in July 1944.

In 1951, the street was renamed Jarosław Dąbrowski Street. During the Polish People's Republic, residential blocks were constructed, and the area was known as "Dąbrowski Estate". The original name, John III Sobieski Street, was restored in 1990.

== Buildings and residents ==
- 1 John III Sobieski Street: a medical clinic and doctors' offices.
- 5 John III Sobieski Street: Queen Zofia Primary School, formerly the C. K. Gymnasium. Before 1939, it was numbered 2 and owned by Katarzyna Siekierzyńska. The building is listed in the municipal register of monuments, published in 2015. Before 1939, it housed the Sanoczanka Ski Section, affiliated with the Sanok branch of the Polish Tatra Society.
- Tenement at 6 John III Sobieski Street: in 1938, Dr. Wołodymyr Karanowycz worked there as a county doctor (Kreisarzt during German occupation, listed as Baranowicz in 1940). Pre-war county doctor Dr. Antoni Dorosz resided there with his family. Stefan Gölis (1909–1959, son of Zygfryd Gölis) lived there during the Polish People's Republic. The building is listed in the municipal register of monuments (2015).
- Tenements at 8 and 10 John III Sobieski Street: originally owned by engineer Władysław Beksiński, later by his heirs. Before 1939, numbered 4 and 6. No. 4 housed Jan Ptyś's egg trade and export business, managed by Wolf Krämer. Both buildings are listed in the municipal register of monuments (2015).
- 9 John III Sobieski Street:
  - Jadczyszyn bakery and retail store, located at the intersection with Sokola Street on the northern side. This site previously housed the post office building (No. 7), constructed by engineer Wilhelm Szomek in the early 20th century and leased for postal services, destroyed by German forces between July and August 1944.
  - Originally wooden house, later rebuilt in brick, owned by the Dydyński family. Residents included Stanisław Domański and his wife Janina. Before 1939, it housed the Sanok Recruitment Office. During German occupation, it served as the Deutsche Zollschule (Customs School) and Knabeschule (Boys' School). The building is listed in the municipal register of monuments (2015).
- Tenement at 12 John III Sobieski Street: built by Szymon Pijanowski, later owned by the Edelheit, Trendota, and Jankowski families. Before 1939 and during the Polish People's Republic, it was numbered 8. Residents included the Artur oil mine in Tyrawa Solna, engineer Leon Friedländer, and lawyer Augustyn Nowotarski. The building is listed in the municipal register of monuments (2015).
- Former Rudak family house: before 1939, numbered 10, home to builder Emil Rudak. During German occupation, it housed the construction firm Bauunternehmung B. Kędzierski u. E. Rudak at 10a John III Sobieski Street. It was located below the Trendota tenement.
- Former Drewiński family house: located opposite the building at 2 Teofil Lenartowicz Street, demolished in the 1970s for a residential block. Residents included Szymon Drewiński (a municipal councillor who arrived in Galicia after 1831 from the Russian Partition), his wife Klara (née Rylska), and their children Sabina, Maurycy (a doctor and director of Sanok General Hospital), and Teodozja (a teacher).
- Residential building: located between 9 John III Sobieski Street and Teofil Lenartowicz Street, previously owned by the Ukrainian Narodnyj Dom society.
- Gregory of Sanok Monument: commemorating Gregory of Sanok, located at the intersection with the building at 2 Teofil Lenartowicz Street. The site, originally Wilhelm Szomek's villa, had the street's only well until Sanok's water supply system was established in 1936.
- Tenement at 16 John III Sobieski Street: listed in the provincial register of monuments (2006) and the municipal register of monuments (2015).
- 21 John III Sobieski Street: former headquarters of Społem and a printing house. Now the seat of TOMA Construction Company.
- 22 John III Sobieski Street: former residence of Andrzej Grasela.
- 23 John III Sobieski Street: Karol Adamiecki School Complex, formerly an economics school and military barracks. Listed in the municipal register of monuments (2015).
- 24 John III Sobieski Street: originally an 18th-century wooden house, rebuilt in the 19th century, listed in the Sanok monument register in 1972. Home to Maksymilian Siess until 1954.
- 30 John III Sobieski Street: former residence of Professor Andrzej Grasela until his death in 1965.

In 1911, residents included judge Marian Kowiński, lawyer Jan Staruszkiewicz, and county doctor Jacek Jabłoński. The street was also home to the Płaz, Gondylowski, and Lewicki families, and Franciszek Kuszczak. In the 1930s, residents included Efroim Krämer (No. 166), the War Invalids Office, Samuel Schorr (mirror and glass trade), and lawyer Dr. Efraim Weidman. Shoemaker Franciszek Chrabąszcz also resided there.

In 1933, the street had 85 buildings, which decreased to 21 by the eve of World War II. The municipal register of monuments, published in 2015, includes buildings at 5, 6, 8, 9, 10, 12, 16, and 23 John III Sobieski Street.

== Bibliography ==
- Dobrowolski, Stanisław (2013). Kamienica. Edelheitowie — Trendotowie — Jankowscy w Sanoku [Tenement. Edelheits — Trendotas — Jankowskis in Sanok] (in Polish). Krosno, Sanok: Ruthenus. ISBN 9788375302349.
