= Przysietnica, Subcarpathian Voivodeship =

Przysietnica
- Village
- Location within Poland
- Coordinates: 49°43′48″N 22°03′04″E
- Country: Poland
- Voivodeship: Podkarpacie
- County: Brzozów County
- Gmina: Brzozów
- Population: 4,000
- Website: http://www.przysietnica.pl/

Przysietnica [pʂɨɕɛtˈɲit͡sa] is a village in the administrative district of Gmina Brzozów, within Brzozów County, Podkarpacie Voivodeship, in southern Poland. It lies approximately 5 kilometres (3 mi) north of Brzozów, 60 km (37 mi) south-east of the regional capital Rzeszów.
