= Nawojowa =

- Village
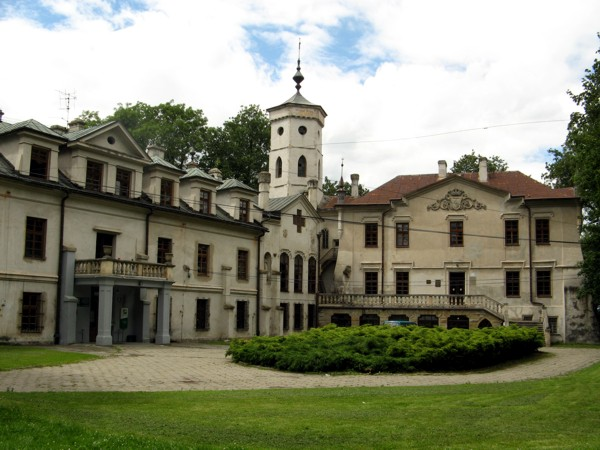
- Stadnicki Palace

- Location within Poland
- Coordinates: 49°33′34″N 20°44′31″E
- Country: Poland
- Voivodeship: Lesser Poland
- County: Nowy Sącz
- Gmina: Nawojowa
- Area: 51.13 km^{2} (19.74 sq mi)

Nawojowa [navɔˈjɔva] is a village in Nowy Sącz County, Lesser Poland Voivodeship, South Poland. It belongs to the gmina (administrative district) called Gmina Nawojowa.

== History ==
=== Early history ===
Nawojowa was founded by Nawoj of Tęczyn, Castellan of Krakow. In later years, it fell into the hands of Dukes Ostrogski and was part of Ostrogski's fee tail (ordynacja). In 1600 it was transferred to House of Lubomirski. At that time it also included 25 settlements laid in the mountains: Szlachtowa, Czarnowoda, Jaworki, Białowoda (today Gmina Szczawnica), Kunina, Bończa, Łazy, Popardowa, Margoń, Rybień, Homrzyska, Złotne, Czaczów, Barnowiec, Roztoka, Składziste, Maciejowa, Łabowa, Lachowiec, Kotów, Młyn, Nowa Wieś, Łosie, Krzyżówka, and Frycowa. In 1793 the property was split and Nawojowa was allotted to Duke Lubomirski, starost of Olsztyn.
