= Boguszowa =

- Village
- Location within Poland
- Coordinates: 49°38′39″N 20°45′56″E
- Country: Poland
- Voivodeship: Lesser Poland
- County: Nowy Sącz
- Gmina: Chełmiec

Boguszowa [bɔˈɡuʂɔva] is a village in the administrative district of Gmina Chełmiec, within Nowy Sącz County, Lesser Poland Voivodeship, in southern Poland.

The village was first mentioned in 1384 as Bogusszowa.
