= Klimkówka =

Klimkówka may refer to the following places:

- Klimkówka, Gorlice County in Lesser Poland Voivodeship (south Poland)
- Klimkówka, Nowy Sącz County in Lesser Poland Voivodeship (south Poland)
- Klimkówka, Subcarpathian Voivodeship (south-east Poland)
