= Kunów (disambiguation) =

Kunów may refer to the following places in Poland:

- Kunów, a town in Świętokrzyskie Voivodeship (south-central Poland)
- Kunów, Wrocław County in Lower Silesian Voivodeship (south-west Poland)
- Kunów, Zgorzelec County in Lower Silesian Voivodeship (south-west Poland)
- Kunów, Lesser Poland Voivodeship (south Poland)
- Kunów, Lubartów County (southeast Poland)
