= Maciejowa, Lesser Poland Voivodeship =

Maciejowa
- Village
- Location within Poland
- Coordinates: 49°32′N 20°52′E
- Country: Poland
- Voivodeship: Lesser Poland
- County: Nowy Sącz
- Gmina: Łabowa

Maciejowa [mat͡ɕɛˈjɔva] (Note: Lemko Rusyn: Матієва, romanized: Matijeva) is a village in the administrative district of Gmina Łabowa, within Nowy Sącz County, Lesser Poland Voivodeship, in southern Poland.
