= Kotów, Lesser Poland Voivodeship =

Kotów
- Village
- Location within Poland
- Coordinates: 49°31′N 20°53′E
- Country: Poland
- Voivodeship: Lesser Poland
- County: Nowy Sącz
- Gmina: Łabowa
- Population: 210

Kotów [ˈkɔtuf] is a village in the administrative district of Gmina Łabowa, within Nowy Sącz County, Lesser Poland Voivodeship, in southern Poland.
