= Wierchomla Wielka =

- Village
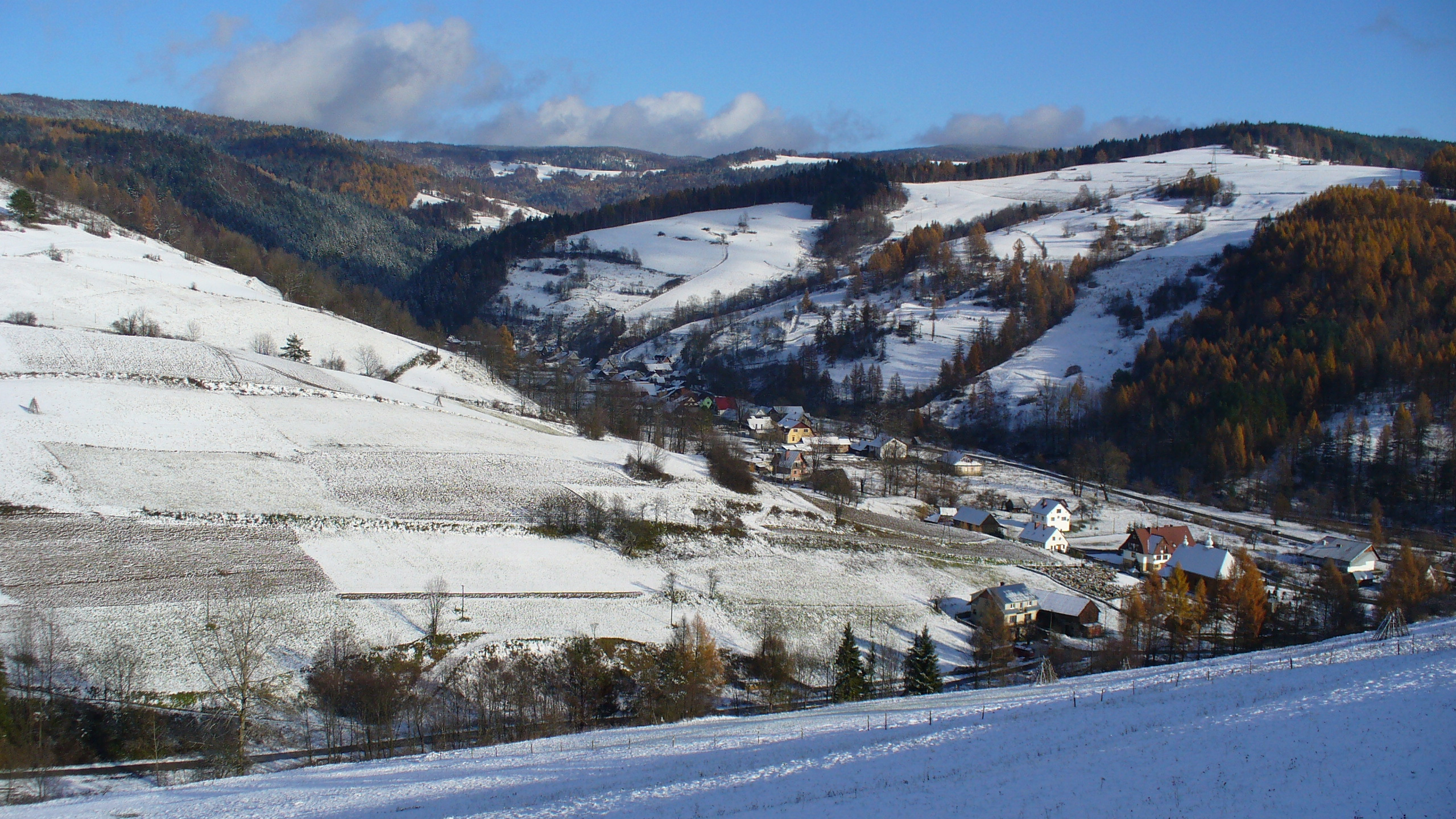
- Wierchomla Wielka

- Location within Poland
- Coordinates: 49°25′N 20°48′E
- Country: Poland
- Voivodeship: Lesser Poland
- County: Nowy Sącz
- Gmina: Piwniczna-Zdrój
- Population: 684

Wierchomla Wielka [vʲɛrˈxɔmla ˈvʲɛlka] (Note: Lemko Rusyn: Верхомля Велика, Verkhomlia Velyka) is a village in the administrative district of Gmina Piwniczna-Zdrój, within Nowy Sącz County, Lesser Poland Voivodeship, in southern Poland, close to the border with Slovakia.
