= Klęczany, Nowy Sącz County =

Klęczany
- Village
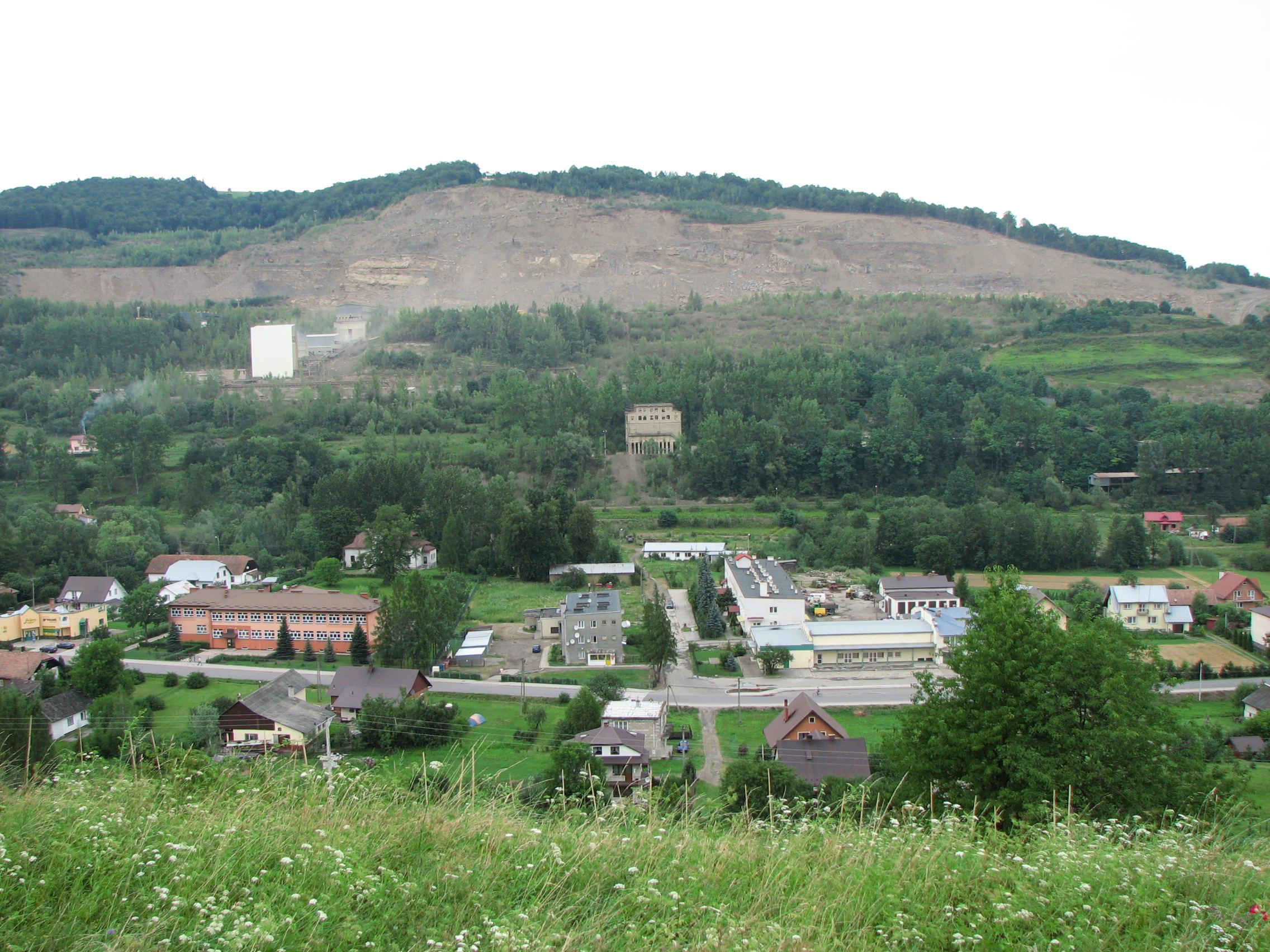
- Rock mine as seen from the opposing mountain

- Location within Poland
- Coordinates: 49°39′58″N 20°37′52″E
- Country: Poland
- Voivodeship: Lesser Poland
- County: Nowy Sącz
- Gmina: Chełmiec
- Population: 1,048

Klęczany [klɛnˈt͡ʂanɨ] is a village in the administrative district of Gmina Chełmiec, within Nowy Sącz County, Lesser Poland Voivodeship, in southern Poland.

== Economy ==
In 1858, oil production was established and, in 1859, an oil refinery operated here until World War I. By 1867, an oil well was drilled with steam to 200 meters.

On 16 December 1884, the Galician Transversal Railway began train services at Klęczany.

=== KSS Rock Mine ===
A prominent landmark in Klęczany is the highly visible rock mine which was opened in 1912, right after World War II, and continues to operate to this day.

The mine produces sandstone, which is later used for roads and other construction projects throughout Poland.
