= Wielopole, Nowy Sącz County =

Wielopole
- Village
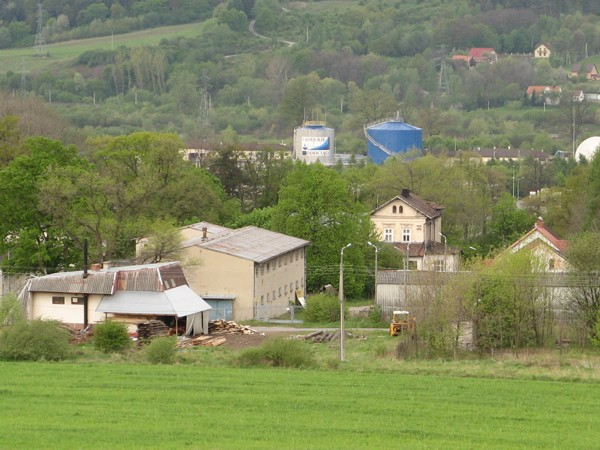

- Location within Poland
- Coordinates: 49°39′42″N 20°41′45″E
- Country: Poland
- Voivodeship: Lesser Poland
- County: Nowy Sącz
- Gmina: Chełmiec
- Elevation: 272 m (892 ft)
- Population: 813

Wielopole [vjɛlɔˈpɔlɛ] is a village in the administrative district of Gmina Chełmiec, within Nowy Sącz County, Lesser Poland Voivodeship, in southern Poland.
