= Żeleźnikowa Wielka =

- Village
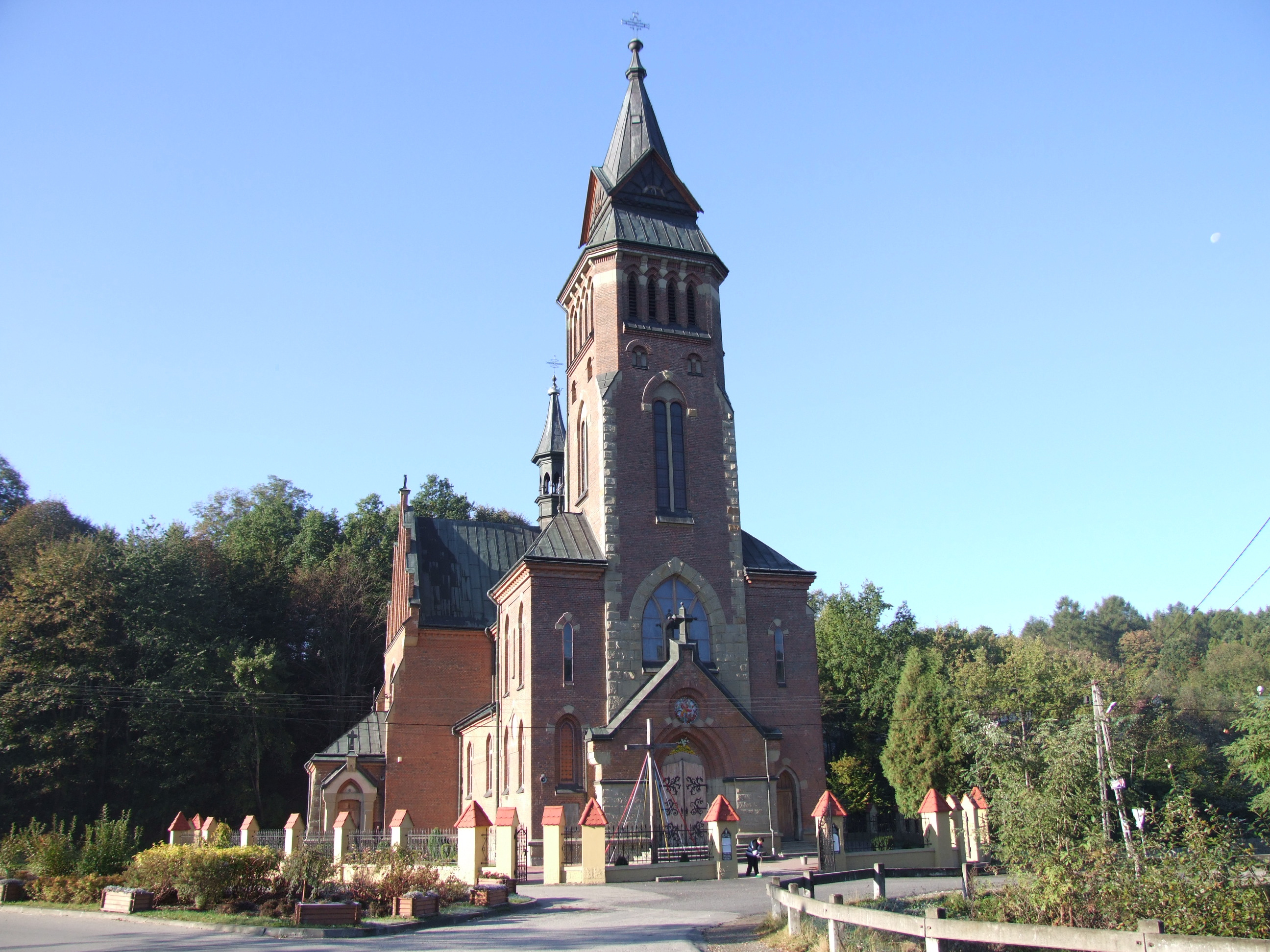
- Church of the Visitation of the Virgin Mary

- Location within Poland
- Coordinates: 49°34′N 20°42′E
- Country: Poland
- Voivodeship: Lesser Poland
- County: Nowy Sącz
- Gmina: Nawojowa
- Population: 1,100

Żeleźnikowa Wielka [ʐɛlɛʑɲiˈkɔva ˈvʲɛlka] is a village in the administrative district of Gmina Nawojowa, within Nowy Sącz County, Lesser Poland Voivodeship, in southern Poland.
