= Złotne =

- Village
- Location within Poland
- Coordinates: 49°30′42″N 20°45′11″E
- Country: Poland
- Voivodeship: Lesser Poland
- County: Nowy Sącz
- Gmina: Nawojowa

Złotne [ˈzwɔtnɛ] is a village in the administrative district of Gmina Nawojowa, within Nowy Sącz County, Lesser Poland Voivodeship, in southern Poland.
