= Uhryń =

- Village
- Location within Poland
- Coordinates: 49°29′N 20°52′E
- Country: Poland
- Voivodeship: Lesser Poland
- County: Nowy Sącz
- Gmina: Łabowa

Uhryń [ˈuxrɨɲ] (Note: Lemko Rusyn: Угрин, Ugryn) is a village in the administrative district of Gmina Łabowa, within Nowy Sącz County, Lesser Poland Voivodeship, in southern Poland.
