= Barnowiec =

Barnowiec refers to the following places in Poland:

- Barnowiec, Lesser Poland Voivodeship
- Barnowiec, Pomeranian Voivodeship
