= Niskowa =

- Village
- Location within Poland
- Coordinates: 49°36′56″N 20°38′5″E
- Country: Poland
- Voivodeship: Lesser Poland
- County: Nowy Sącz
- Gmina: Chełmiec
- Population: 711

Niskowa [nisˈkɔva] is a village in the administrative district of Gmina Chełmiec, within Nowy Sącz County, Lesser Poland Voivodeship, in southern Poland.
