= Łosie, Nowy Sącz County =

Łosie
- Village
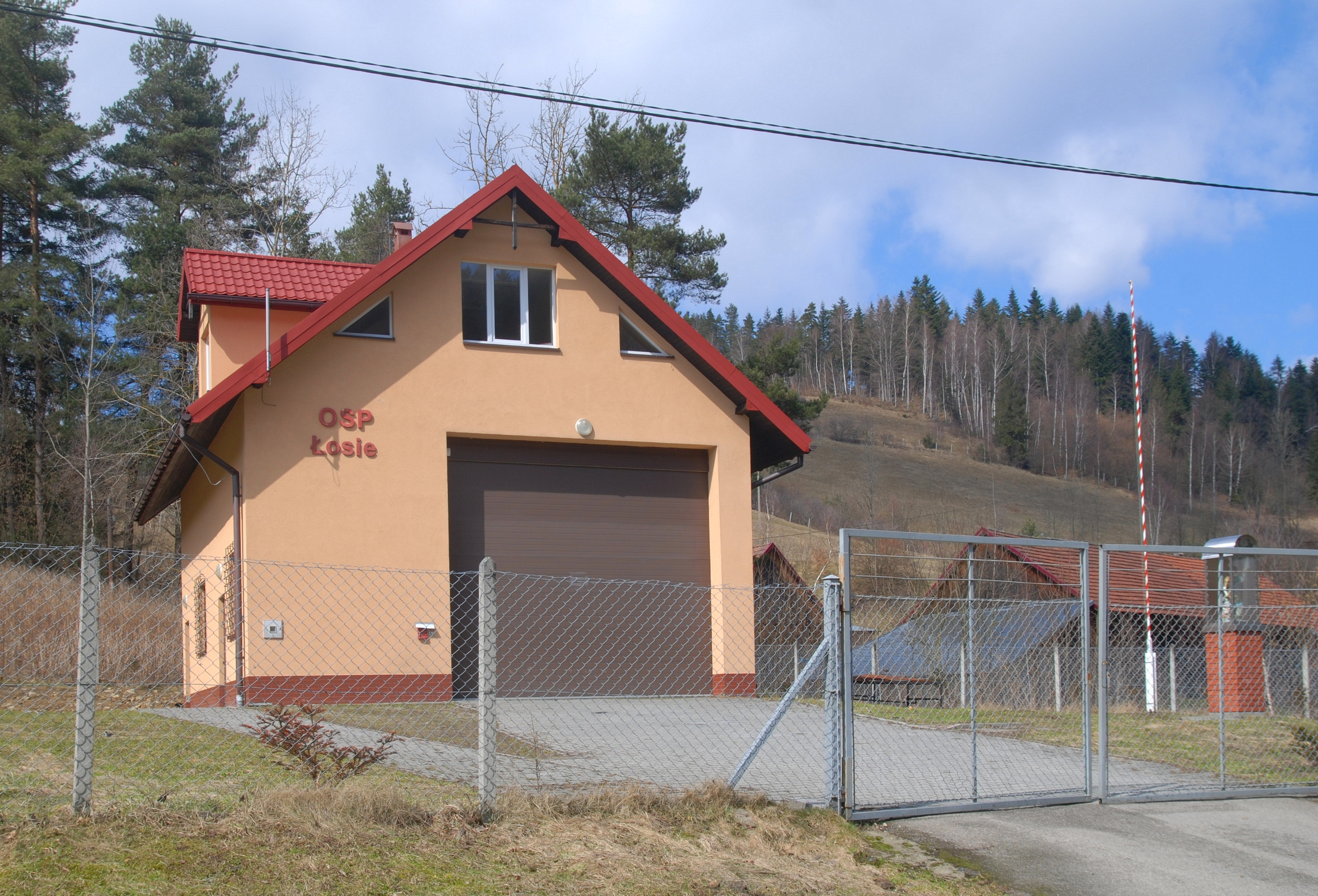
- Volunteer fire station in Łosie

- Location within Poland
- Coordinates: 49°28′N 20°55′E
- Country: Poland
- Voivodeship: Lesser Poland
- County: Nowy Sącz
- Gmina: Łabowa

Łosie [ˈwɔɕɛ] (Note: Lemko Rusyn: Лосє, Losie) is a village in the administrative district of Gmina Łabowa, within Nowy Sącz County, Lesser Poland Voivodeship, in southern Poland.
