= Głębokie, Lesser Poland Voivodeship =

Głębokie
- Village
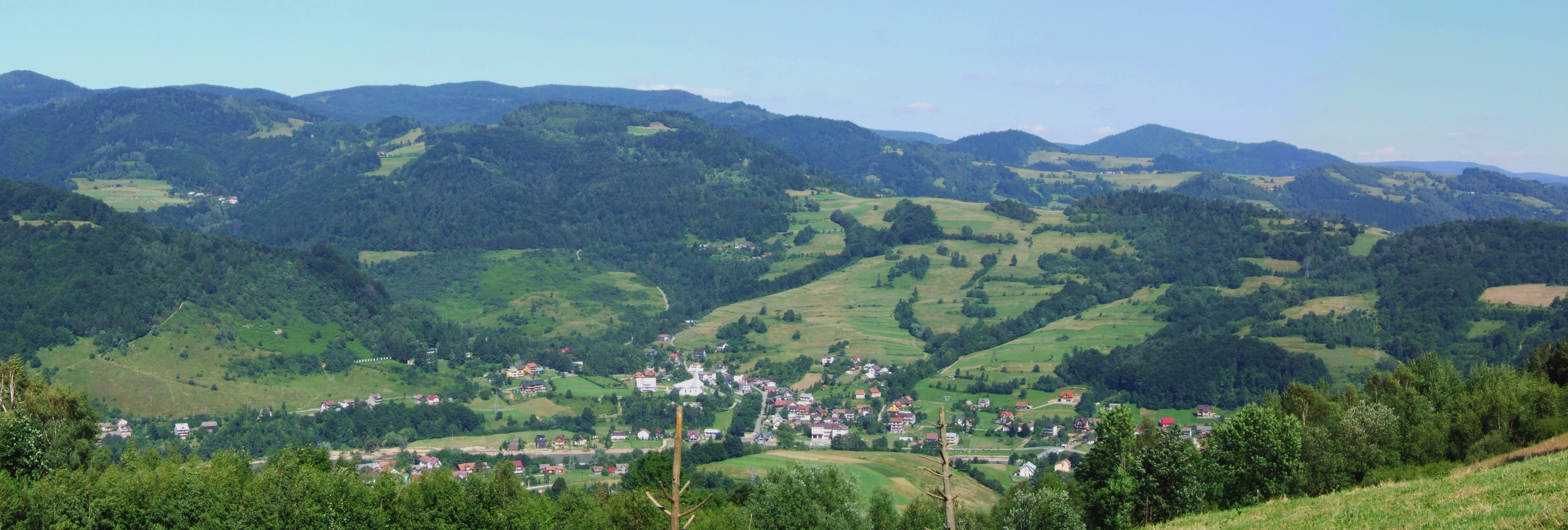
- Głębokie

- Location within Poland
- Coordinates: 49°28′N 20°42′E
- Country: Poland
- Voivodeship: Lesser Poland
- County: Nowy Sącz
- Gmina: Piwniczna-Zdrój

Głębokie [ɡwɛmˈbɔkʲɛ] is a village in the administrative district of Gmina Piwniczna-Zdrój, within Nowy Sącz County, Lesser Poland Voivodeship, in southern Poland, close to the border with Slovakia.
