= Piątkowa =

Piątkowa may refer to the following places:

- Piątkowa, Lesser Poland Voivodeship (south Poland)
- Piątkowa, Przemyśl County in Subcarpathian Voivodeship (south-east Poland)
- Piątkowa, Rzeszów County in Subcarpathian Voivodeship (south-east Poland)
