= Zubrzyk =

- Village
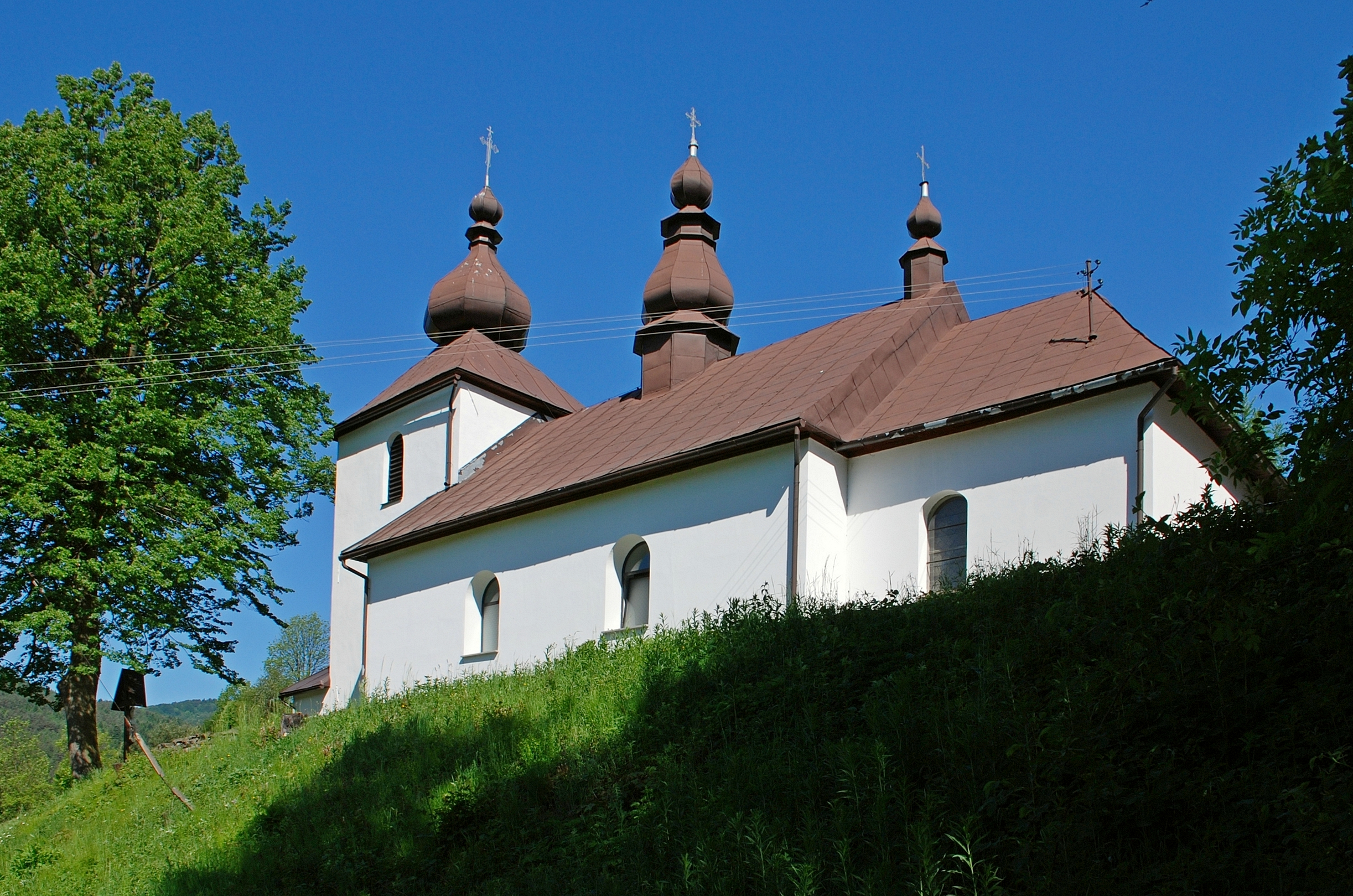
- Church of Saint Luke

- Location within Poland
- Coordinates: 49°24′N 20°46′E
- Country: Poland
- Voivodeship: Lesser Poland
- County: Nowy Sącz
- Gmina: Piwniczna-Zdrój

Zubrzyk [ˈzubʐɨk] (Ukrainian: Зубрик, Zubryk) is a village in the administrative district of Gmina Piwniczna-Zdrój, within Nowy Sącz County, Lesser Poland Voivodeship, in southern Poland, close to the border with Slovakia.
