= Wielogłowy, Lesser Poland Voivodeship =

Wielogłowy
- Village
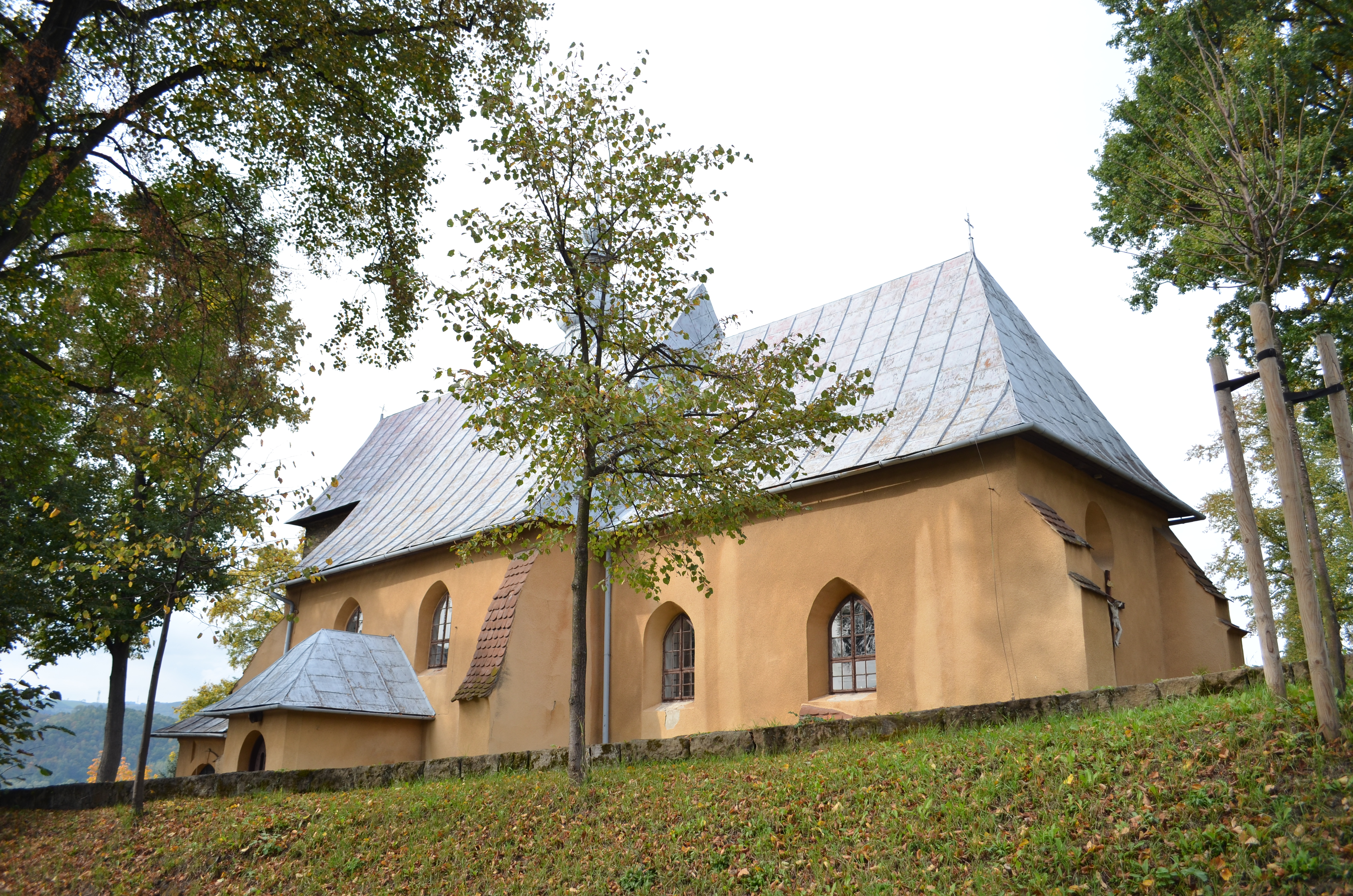
- Church of the Assumption

- Location within Poland
- Coordinates: 49°40′45″N 20°41′28″E
- Country: Poland
- Voivodeship: Lesser Poland
- County: Nowy Sącz
- Gmina: Chełmiec
- Population: 1,102

Wielogłowy [vjɛlɔˈɡwɔvɨ] is a village in the administrative district of Gmina Chełmiec, within Nowy Sącz County, Lesser Poland Voivodeship, in southern Poland.
