= Życzanów =

- Village
- Location within Poland
- Coordinates: 49°30′03″N 20°40′38″E
- Country: Poland
- Voivodeship: Lesser Poland
- County: Nowy Sącz
- Gmina: Rytro

Życzanów is a village in the administrative district of Gmina Rytro, within Nowy Sącz County, Lesser Poland Voivodeship, in southern Poland.
