= Kamionka Mała, Nowy Sącz County =

Kamionka Mała
- Village
- Location within Poland
- Coordinates: 49°35′N 20°47′E
- Country: Poland
- Voivodeship: Lesser Poland
- County: Nowy Sącz
- Gmina: Kamionka Wielka

Kamionka Mała [kaˈmʲɔŋka ˈmawa] is a village in the administrative district of Gmina Kamionka Wielka, within Nowy Sącz County, Lesser Poland Voivodeship, in southern Poland.
