= Królowa Górna =

- Village
- Królowa Górna and the Church of the Nativity of the Virgin Mary

- Location within Poland
- Coordinates: 49°34′58″N 20°50′59″E
- Country: Poland
- Voivodeship: Lesser Poland
- County: Nowy Sącz
- Gmina: Kamionka Wielka

Królowa Górna [kruˈlɔva ˈɡurna] (Note: Rusyn: Королева Руська, Koroleva Rus’ka) is a village in the administrative district of Gmina Kamionka Wielka, within Nowy Sącz County, Lesser Poland Voivodeship, in southern Poland.
