= Chomranice =

- Village
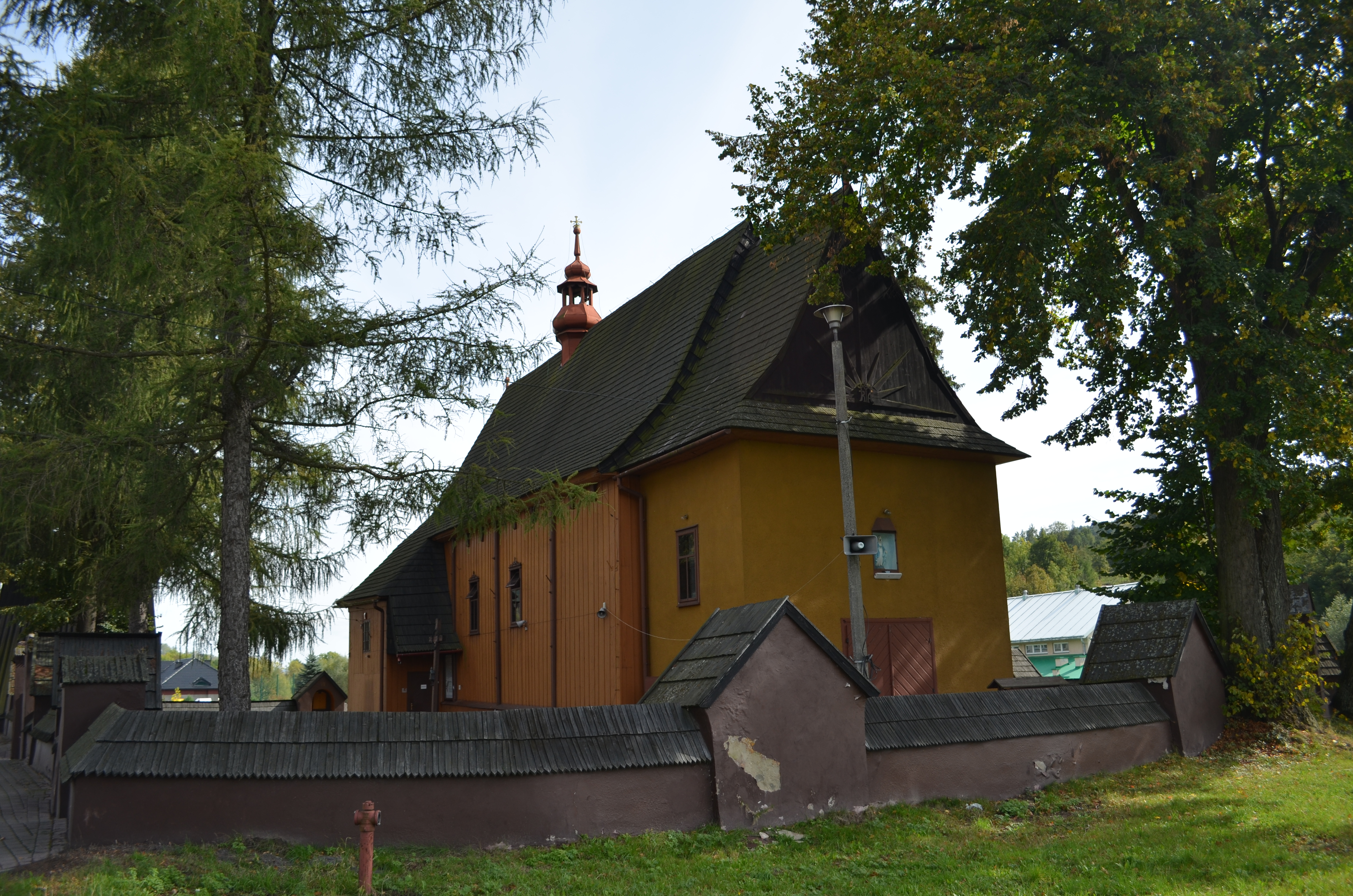
- Church of the Holy Name of Mary

- Location within Poland
- Coordinates: 49°40′34″N 20°35′52″E
- Country: Poland
- Voivodeship: Lesser Poland
- County: Nowy Sącz
- Gmina: Chełmiec

Population
  - Total: 931

Chomranice [xɔmraˈnit͡sɛ] is a village in the administrative district of Gmina Chełmiec, within Nowy Sącz County, Lesser Poland Voivodeship, in southern Poland.
