= Marcinkowice, Nowy Sącz County =

Marcinkowice
- Village
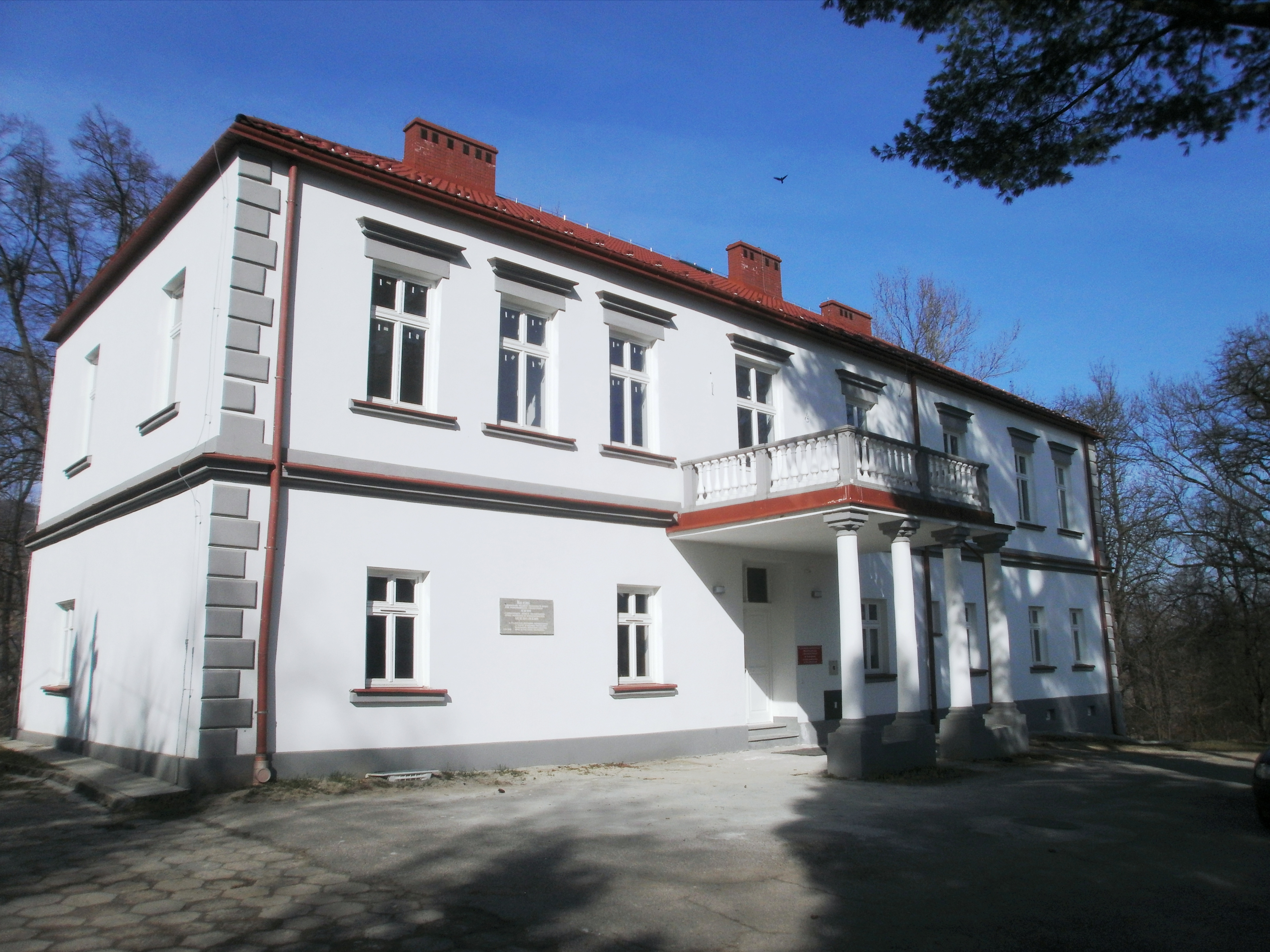
- Manor house in Marcinkowice

- Location within Poland
- Coordinates: 49°40′7″N 20°39′28″E
- Country: Poland
- Voivodeship: Lesser Poland
- County: Nowy Sącz
- Gmina: Chełmiec
- Population: 2,044

Marcinkowice [mart͡ɕiŋkɔˈvit͡sɛ] is a village in the administrative district of Gmina Chełmiec, within Nowy Sącz County, Lesser Poland Voivodeship, in southern Poland.
