= Paszyn =

- Village
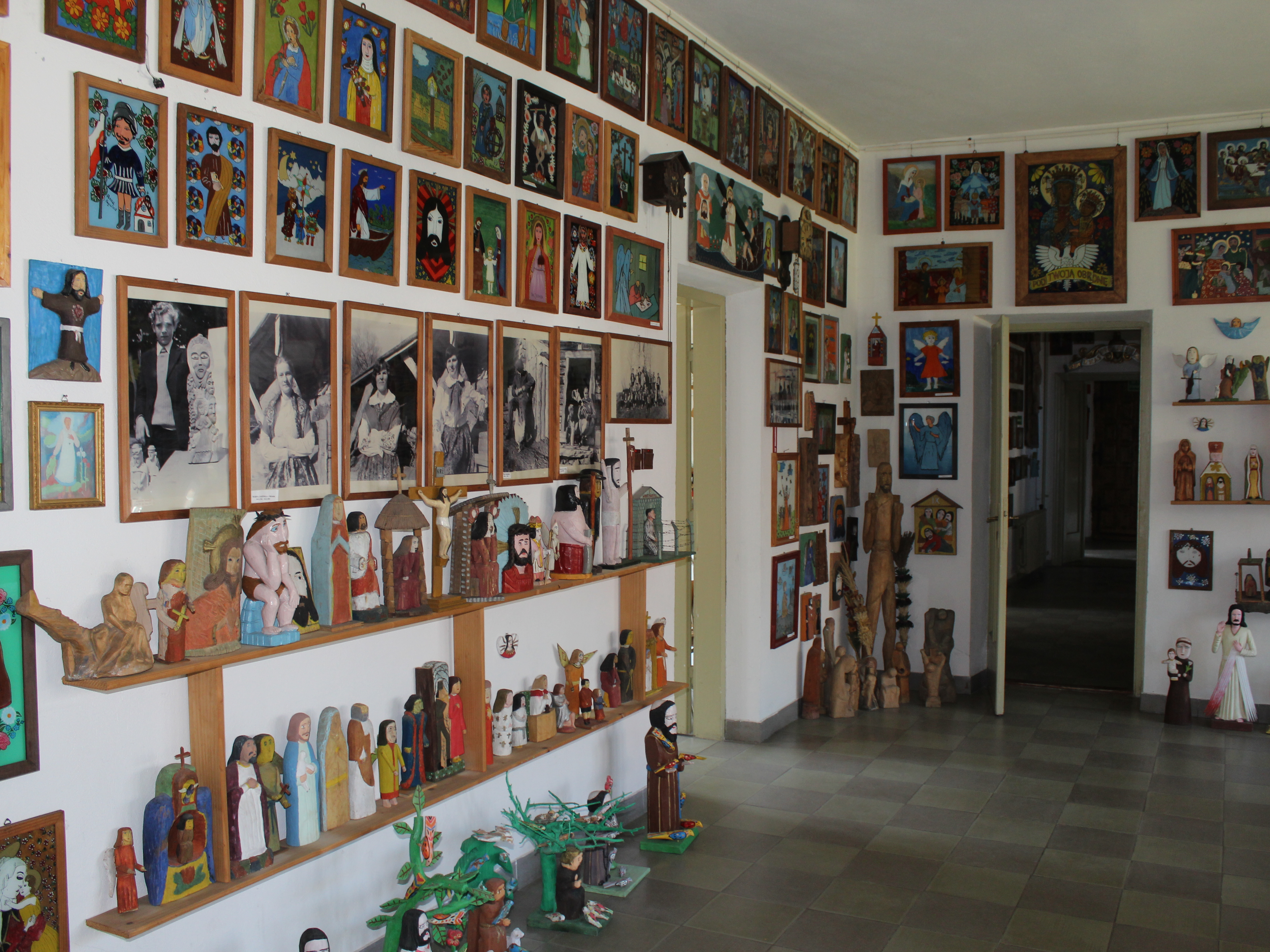
- Museum in Paszyn

- Location within Poland
- Coordinates: 49°37′22″N 20°46′52″E
- Country: Poland
- Voivodeship: Lesser Poland
- County: Nowy Sącz
- Gmina: Chełmiec
- Population: 2,070

Paszyn [ˈpaʂɨn] is a village in the administrative district of Gmina Chełmiec, within Nowy Sącz County, Lesser Poland Voivodeship, in southern Poland.
