= Bącza Kunina =

- Village
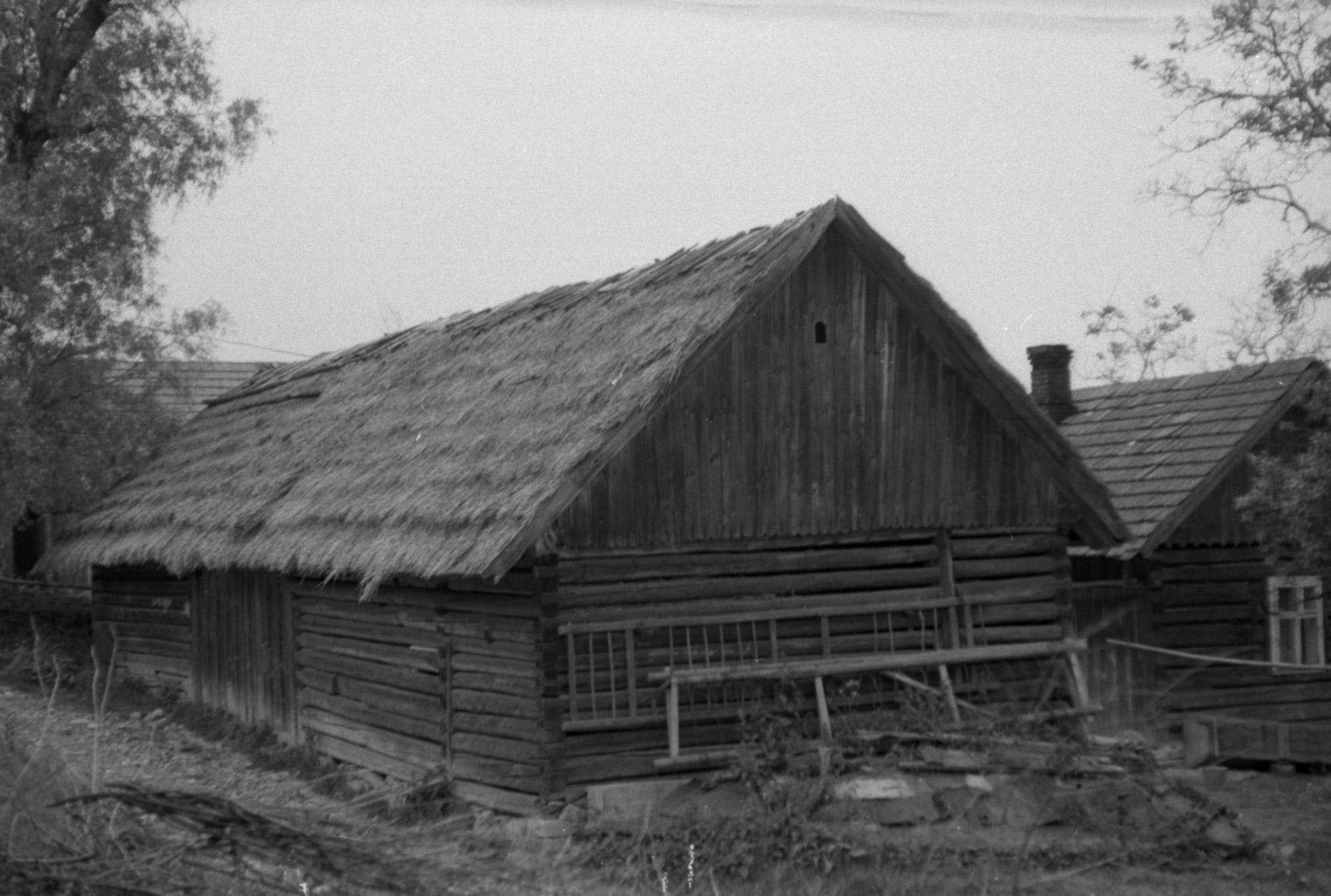

- Location within Poland
- Coordinates: 49°33′N 20°45′E
- Country: Poland
- Voivodeship: Lesser Poland
- County: Nowy Sącz
- Gmina: Nawojowa

Bącza Kunina [ˈbɔnt͡ʂa kuˈɲina] is a village in the administrative district of Gmina Nawojowa, within Nowy Sącz County, Lesser Poland Voivodeship, in southern Poland.
