= Dąbrowa, Nowy Sącz County =

Dąbrowa
- Village
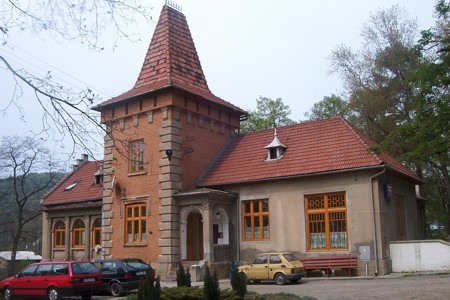
- Manor house

- Location within Poland
- Coordinates: 49°40′51″N 20°40′38″E
- Country: Poland
- Voivodeship: Lesser Poland
- County: Nowy Sącz
- Gmina: Chełmiec
- Population: 830

Dąbrowa [dɔmˈbrɔva] is a village in the administrative district of Gmina Chełmiec, within Nowy Sącz County, Lesser Poland Voivodeship, in southern Poland.
