= Sucha Struga =

- Village
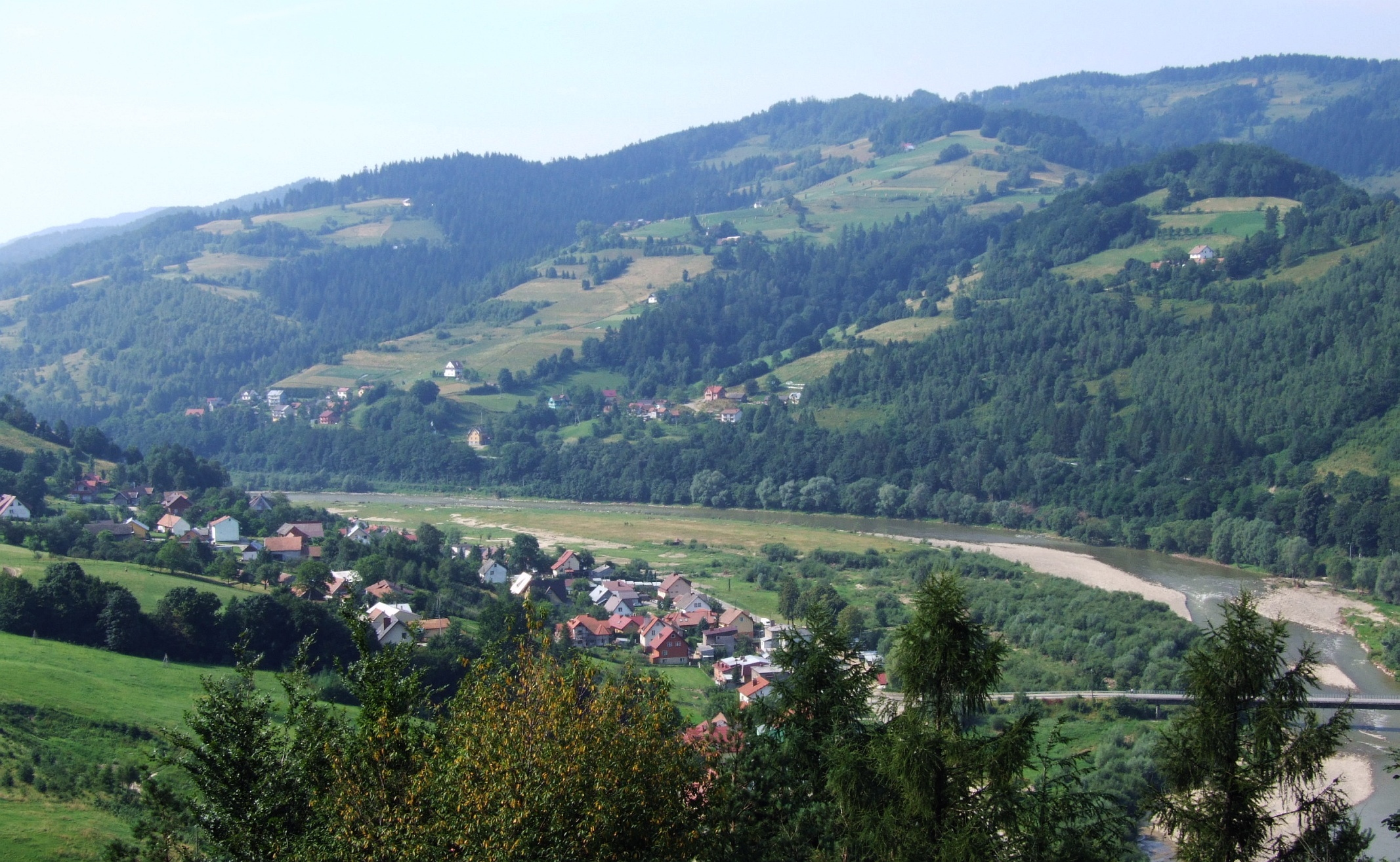
- Sucha Struga

- Location within Poland
- Coordinates: 49°29′N 20°41′E
- Country: Poland
- Voivodeship: Lesser Poland
- County: Nowy Sącz
- Gmina: Rytro
- Elevation: 948 m (3,110 ft)
- Population: 900

Sucha Struga [ˈsuxa ˈstruɡa] is a village in the administrative district of Gmina Rytro, within Nowy Sącz County, Lesser Poland Voivodeship, in southern Poland.
