= Krasne Potockie =

- Village
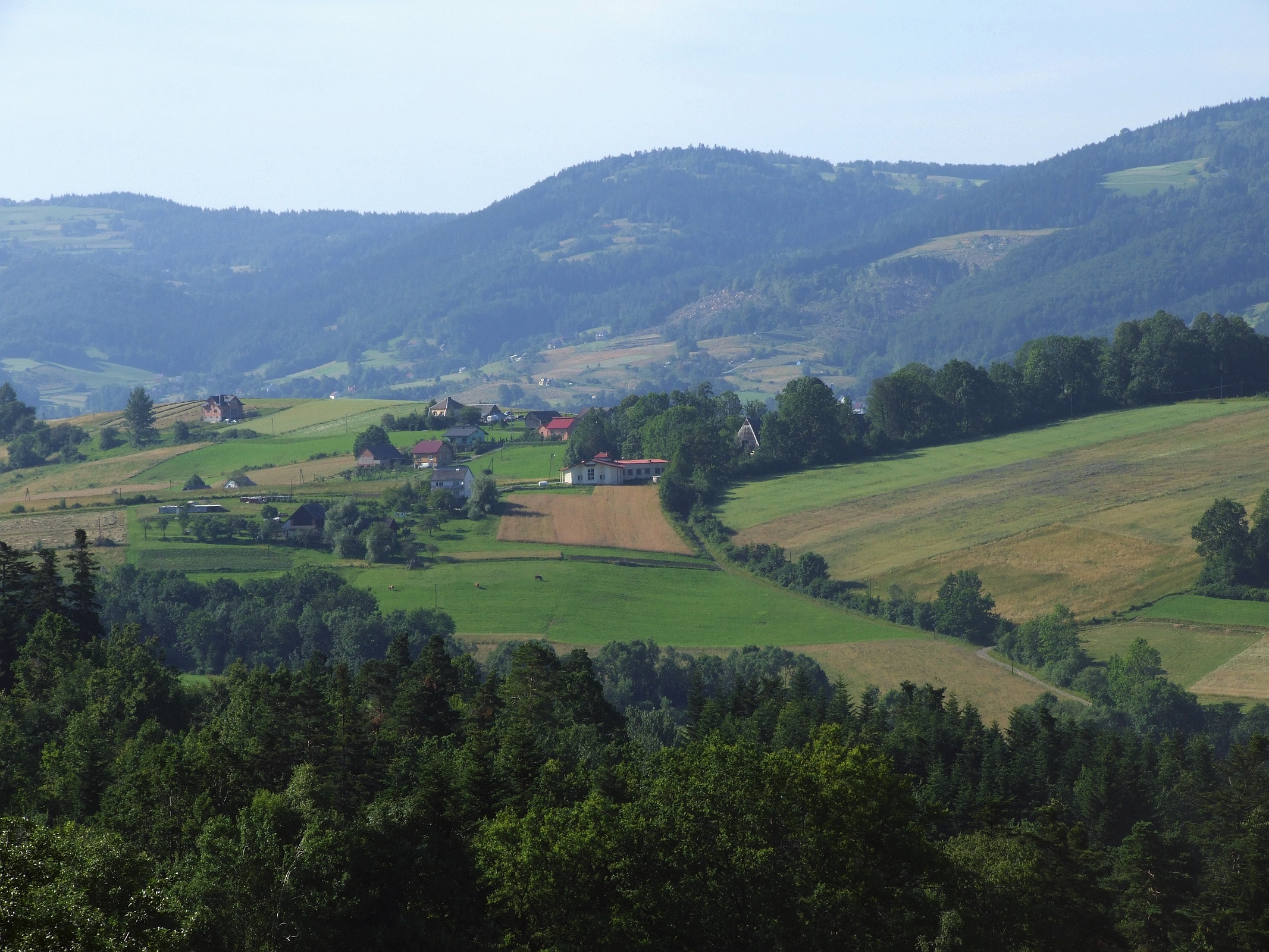

- Location within Poland
- Coordinates: 49°39′44″N 20°35′20″E
- Country: Poland
- Voivodeship: Lesser Poland
- County: Nowy Sącz
- Gmina: Chełmiec
- Population: 962

Krasne Potockie [ˈkrasnɛ pɔˈtɔt͡skʲɛ] is a village in the administrative district of Gmina Chełmiec, within Nowy Sącz County, Lesser Poland Voivodeship, in southern Poland.
