= Wierchomla Mała =

- Village
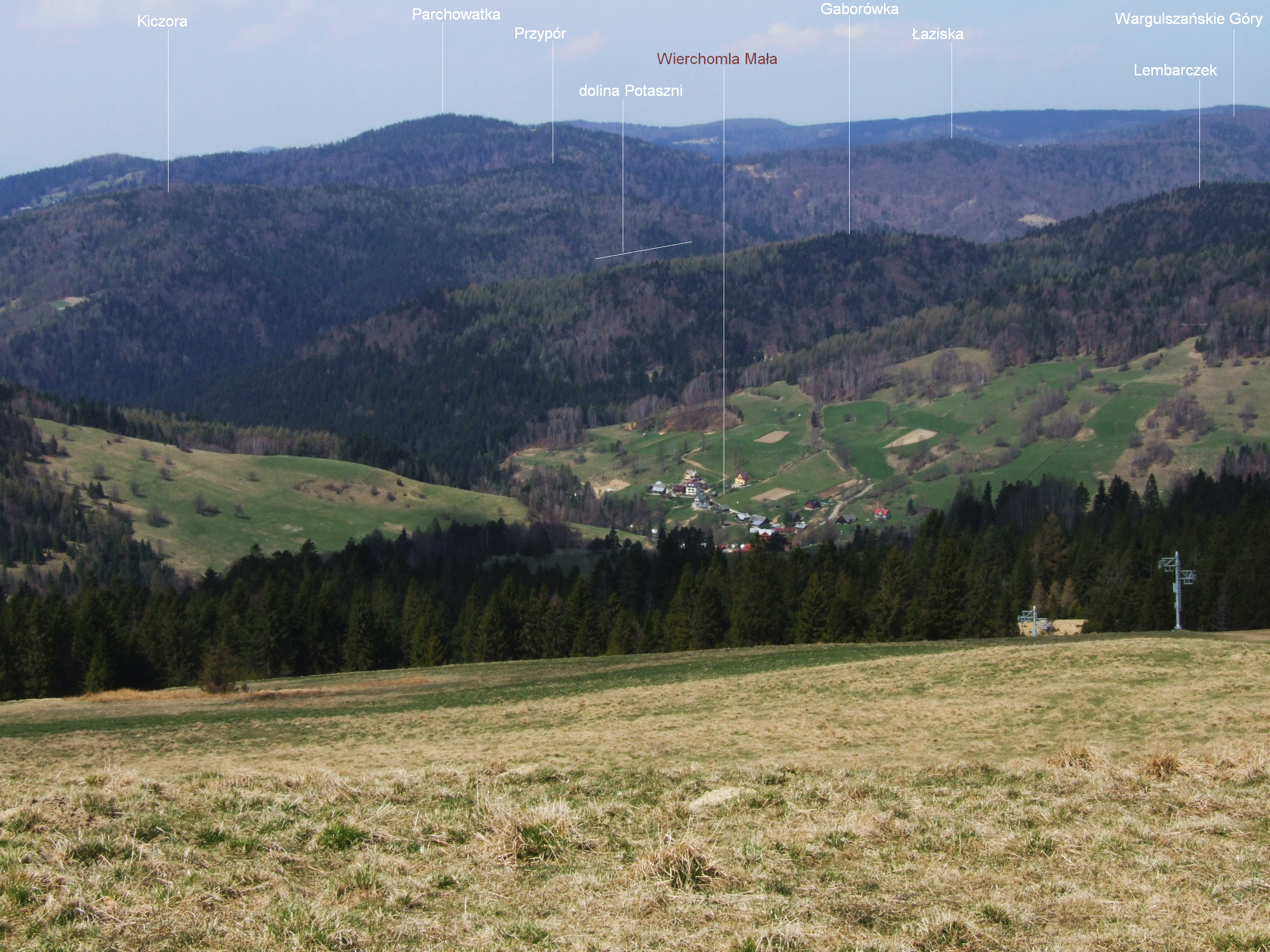
- Wierchomla Mała

- Location within Poland
- Coordinates: 49°26′N 20°49′E
- Country: Poland
- Voivodeship: Lesser Poland
- County: Nowy Sącz
- Gmina: Piwniczna-Zdrój

Wierchomla Mała [vʲɛrˈxɔmla ˈmawa] (Note: Lemko Rusyn: Верхомля Мала, Verkhomlia Mala) is a village in the administrative district of Gmina Piwniczna-Zdrój, within Nowy Sącz County, Lesser Poland Voivodeship, in southern Poland, close to the border with Slovakia.
