= Roztoka Wielka =

- Village

- Location within Poland
- Coordinates: 49°28′N 20°56′E
- Country: Poland
- Voivodeship: Lesser Poland
- County: Nowy Sącz
- Gmina: Łabowa

Roztoka Wielka [rɔsˈtɔka ˈvʲɛlka] (Note: Lemko Rusyn: Розтока Велика, Roztoka Velyka) is a village in the administrative district of Gmina Łabowa, within Nowy Sącz County, Lesser Poland Voivodeship, in southern Poland.
