= Kamianna =

- Village
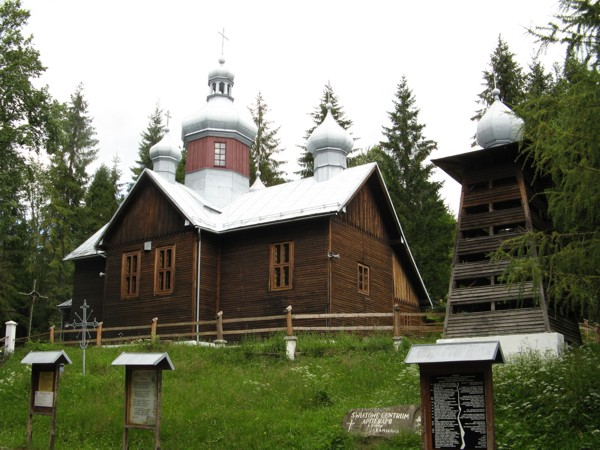
- Roman Catholic church (formerly Greek Orthodox church)

- Location within Poland
- Coordinates: 49°31′25″N 20°56′9″E
- Country: Poland
- Voivodeship: Lesser Poland
- County: Nowy Sącz
- Gmina: Łabowa

Kamianna [kaˈmʲanːa] (Note: Lemko dialect Rusyn: Кам'яна, Kamyana) is a village in the administrative district of Gmina Łabowa, within Nowy Sącz County, Lesser Poland Voivodeship, in southern Poland.
