= Bogusza =

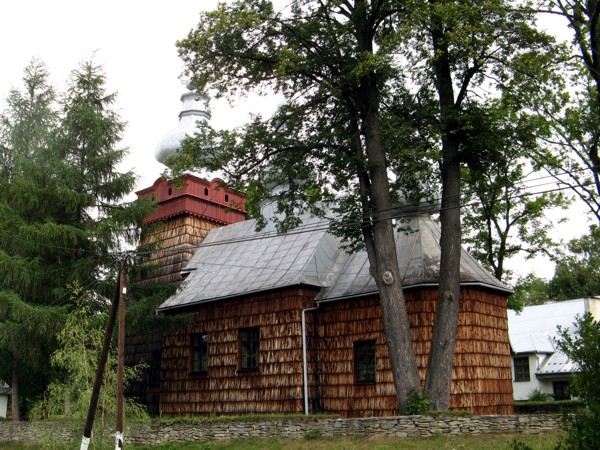
- Wooden Orthodox church in Bogusza

- Location within Poland
- Coordinates: 49°34′N 20°53′E
- Country: Poland
- Voivodeship: Lesser Poland
- County: Nowy Sącz
- Gmina: Kamionka Wielka

Area
  - Total: 12.97 km^{2} (5.01 sq mi)

Population (2006)
  - Total: 610
  - Density: 47/km^{2} (120/sq mi)
- Time zone: UTC+1 (CET)
  - Summer (DST): UTC+2 (CEST)
- Postal code: 33-334
- Area code: +48 18
- Car plates: KNS

Bogusza [bɔˈɡuʂa] is a village in southern Poland.

== Geography ==
Bogusza is located in a mountain valley in the Lesser Poland Voivodeship, along a stream named the Królówka, in the county of Nowy Sącz.

== History ==
The town was essentially de-populated after World War II in Operation Vistula in 1947.

== Monuments ==
The town is the site of the wooden church of St. Demetrius, built in 1858.
