= Ubiad =

- Village
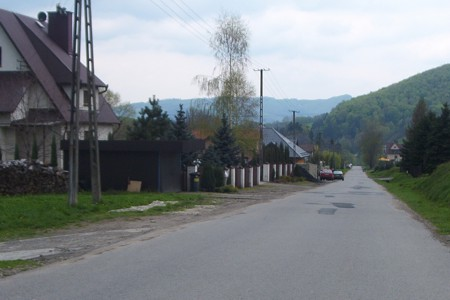

- Location within Poland
- Coordinates: 49°41′3″N 20°42′23″E
- Country: Poland
- Voivodeship: Lesser Poland
- County: Nowy Sącz
- Gmina: Chełmiec
- Population: 565

Ubiad [ˈubjat] is a village in the administrative district of Gmina Chełmiec, within Nowy Sącz County, Lesser Poland Voivodeship, in southern Poland.

== Demography ==
According to the 2021 census, the total population was 644, with 48% (309) being females and 52% (335) being males. The census also revealed that the population density was 200.0/km², with the surface area being 3.220 km².
