= Jamnica, Lesser Poland Voivodeship =

Jamnica
- Village
- Location within Poland
- Coordinates: 49°34′56″N 20°45′19″E
- Country: Poland
- Voivodeship: Lesser Poland
- County: Nowy Sącz
- Gmina: Kamionka Wielka
- Elevation: 500 m (1,600 ft)
- Population (approx.): 720

Jamnica [jamˈɲit͡sa] is a village in the administrative district of Gmina Kamionka Wielka, within Nowy Sącz County, Lesser Poland Voivodeship, in southern Poland.

The village has an approximate population of 720.
