= Łomnica-Zdrój =

- Village
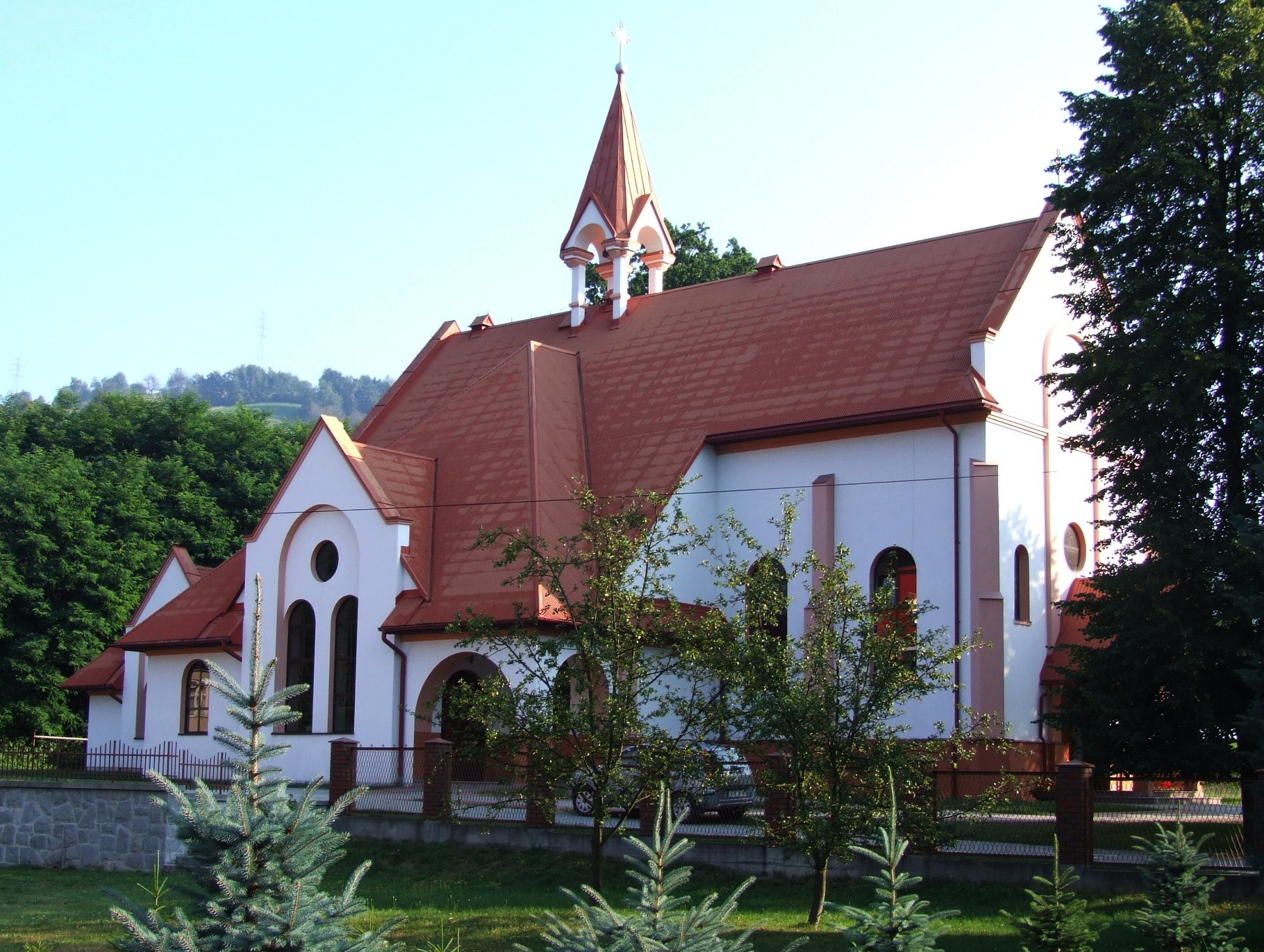
- Church

- Coat of arms

- Location within Poland
- Coordinates: 49°26′N 20°44′E
- Country: Poland
- Voivodeship: Lesser Poland
- County: Nowy Sącz
- Gmina: Piwniczna-Zdrój
- Population: 2,000
- Website: http://lomnica-zdroj.pl

Łomnica-Zdrój [wɔmˈɲit͡sa ˈzdrui̯] is a village in the administrative district of Gmina Piwniczna-Zdrój, within Nowy Sącz County, Lesser Poland Voivodeship, in southern Poland, close to the border with Slovakia.
