= Wola Marcinkowska =

- Village
- Location within Poland
- Coordinates: 49°39′25″N 20°36′15″E
- Country: Poland
- Voivodeship: Lesser Poland
- County: Nowy Sącz
- Gmina: Chełmiec
- Population: 269

Wola Marcinkowska [ˈvɔla mart͡ɕiŋˈkɔfska] is a village in the administrative district of Gmina Chełmiec, within Nowy Sącz County, Lesser Poland Voivodeship, in southern Poland.
