= Rdziostów =

- Village
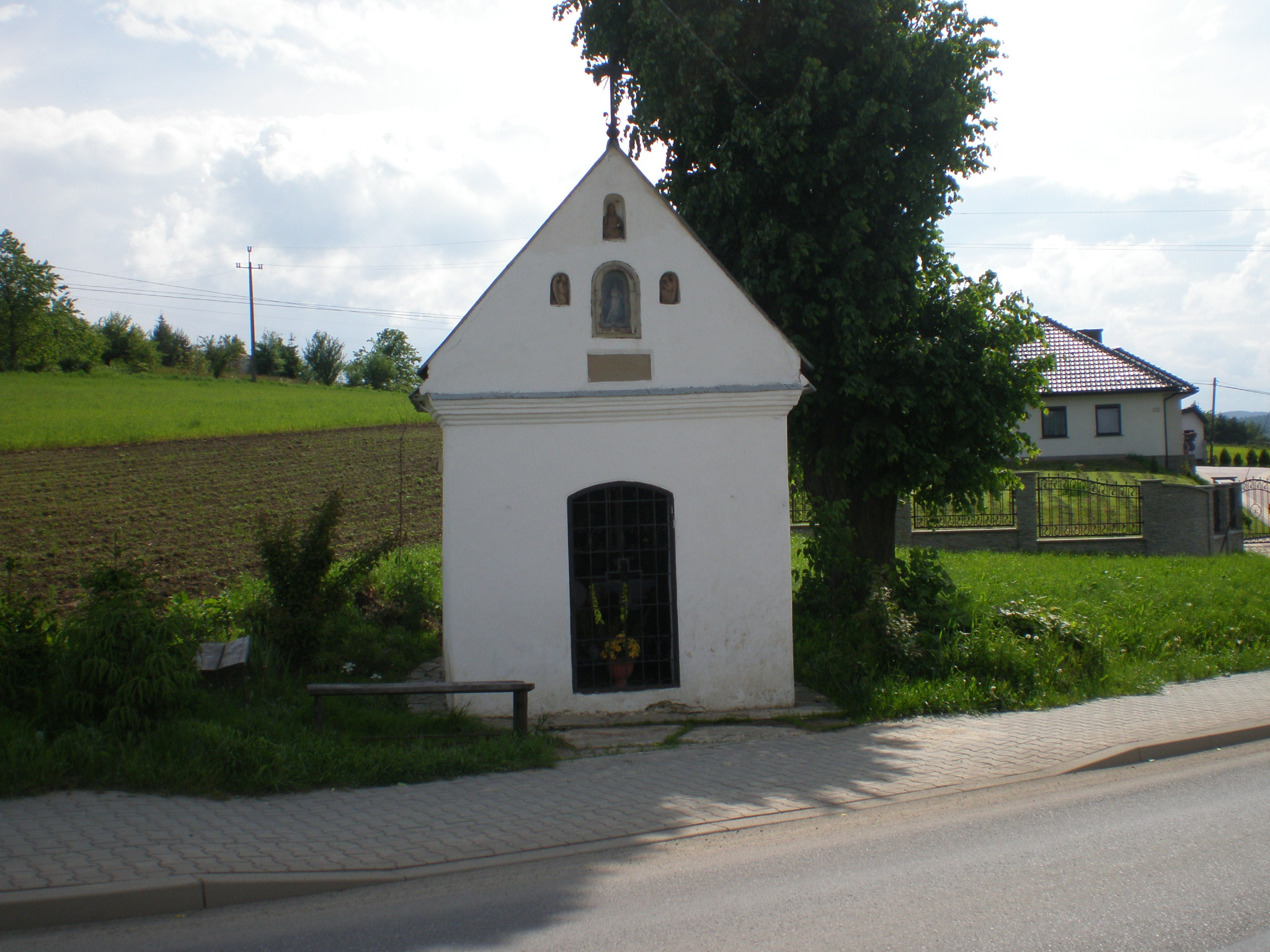

- Location within Poland
- Coordinates: 49°39′28″N 20°40′5″E
- Country: Poland
- Voivodeship: Lesser Poland
- County: Nowy Sącz
- Gmina: Chełmiec
- Population: 431

Rdziostów [ˈrd͡ʑɔstuf] is a village in the administrative district of Gmina Chełmiec, within Nowy Sącz County, Lesser Poland Voivodeship, in southern Poland.
