= Obłazy Ryterskie =

- Village
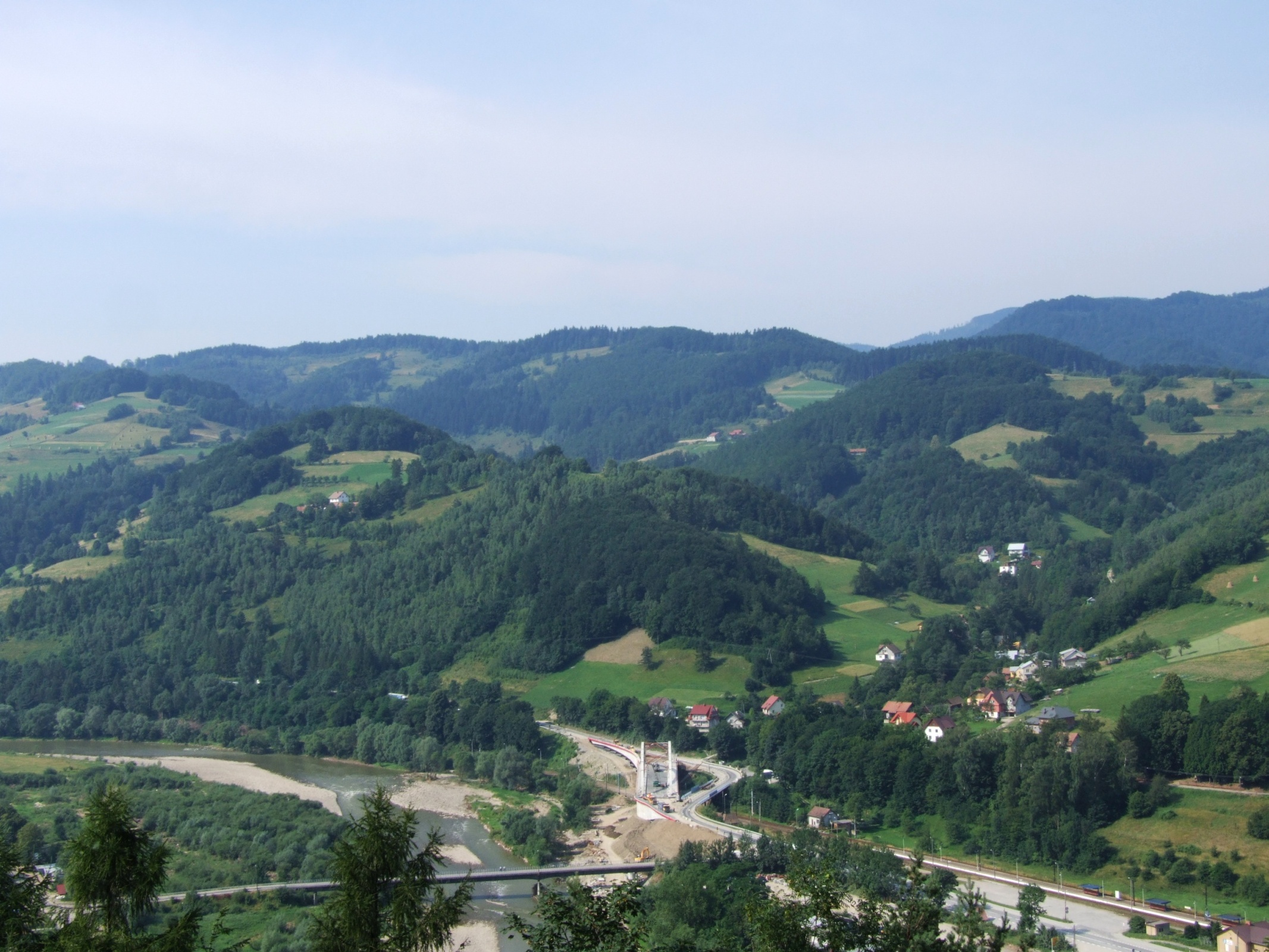
- Obłazy Ryterskie

- Location within Poland
- Coordinates: 49°28′30″N 20°40′30″E
- Country: Poland
- Voivodeship: Lesser Poland
- County: Nowy Sącz
- Gmina: Rytro

Obłazy Ryterskie [ɔˈbwazɨ rɨˈtɛrskʲɛ] is a village in the administrative district of Gmina Rytro, within Nowy Sącz County, Lesser Poland Voivodeship, in southern Poland.
