= Młodów, Lesser Poland Voivodeship =

Młodów
- Village
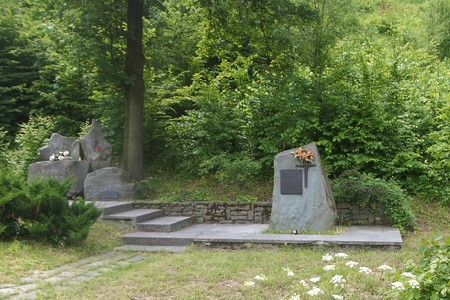
- Monument

- Location within Poland
- Coordinates: 49°28′N 20°41′E
- Country: Poland
- Voivodeship: Lesser Poland
- County: Nowy Sącz
- Gmina: Piwniczna-Zdrój
- Elevation: 1,001 m (3,284 ft)

Młodów [ˈmwɔduf] is a village in the administrative district of Gmina Piwniczna-Zdrój, within Nowy Sącz County, Lesser Poland Voivodeship, in southern Poland, close to the border with Slovakia.

== History ==
First mention about Młodów is from 1348, when it was mentioned as existing village in foundation document of Piwniczna-Szyja issued by Casimir III the Great (cuius limites erunt incipiendo de Mlodow et Glembokie usque in Narth). From 1770 Młodów was in boundaries of Habsburg monarchy. In the 90s the nineteenth century there were 190 inhabitants in Młodów. There were also water mill and tavern 'austeryja Witkowskie'.
