= Biczyce Górne =

- Village
- Location within Poland
- Coordinates: 49°38′12″N 20°37′4″E
- Country: Poland
- Voivodeship: Lesser Poland
- County: Nowy Sącz
- Gmina: Chełmiec
- Population: 555

Biczyce Górne [biˈt͡ʂɨt͡sɛ ˈɡurnɛ] is a village in the administrative district of Gmina Chełmiec, within Nowy Sącz County, Lesser Poland Voivodeship, in southern Poland.
