= Wola Kurowska =

- Village
- Location within Poland
- Coordinates: 49°41′29″N 20°40′54″E
- Country: Poland
- Voivodeship: Lesser Poland
- County: Nowy Sącz
- Gmina: Chełmiec
- Population: 239

Wola Kurowska [ˈvɔla kuˈrɔfska] is a village in the administrative district of Gmina Chełmiec, within Nowy Sącz County, Lesser Poland Voivodeship, in southern Poland.
