= Zagóry, Lesser Poland Voivodeship =

Zagóry
- Village
- Location within Poland
- Coordinates: 49°33′21″N 20°50′7″E
- Country: Poland
- Voivodeship: Lesser Poland
- County: Nowy Sącz
- Gmina: Kamionka Wielka

Zagóry [zaˈɡurɨ] is a village in the administrative district of Gmina Kamionka Wielka, within Nowy Sącz County, Lesser Poland Voivodeship, in southern Poland.
