= Żeleźnikowa Mała =

- Village
- Location within Poland
- Coordinates: 49°33′N 20°42′E
- Country: Poland
- Voivodeship: Lesser Poland
- County: Nowy Sącz
- Gmina: Nawojowa

Żeleźnikowa Mała [ʐɛlɛʑɲiˈkɔva ˈmawa] is a village in the administrative district of Gmina Nawojowa, within Nowy Sącz County, Lesser Poland Voivodeship, in southern Poland.
