= Łabowiec =

- Village
- Location within Poland
- Coordinates: 49°30′50″N 20°50′48″E
- Country: Poland
- Voivodeship: Lesser Poland
- County: Nowy Sącz
- Gmina: Łabowa

Łabowiec [waˈbɔvʲɛt͡s] (Note: Lemko Rusyn: Лабовец, romanized: Labovec) is a village in the administrative district of Gmina Łabowa, within Nowy Sącz County, Lesser Poland Voivodeship, in southern Poland.
