= Królowa Polska =

- Village
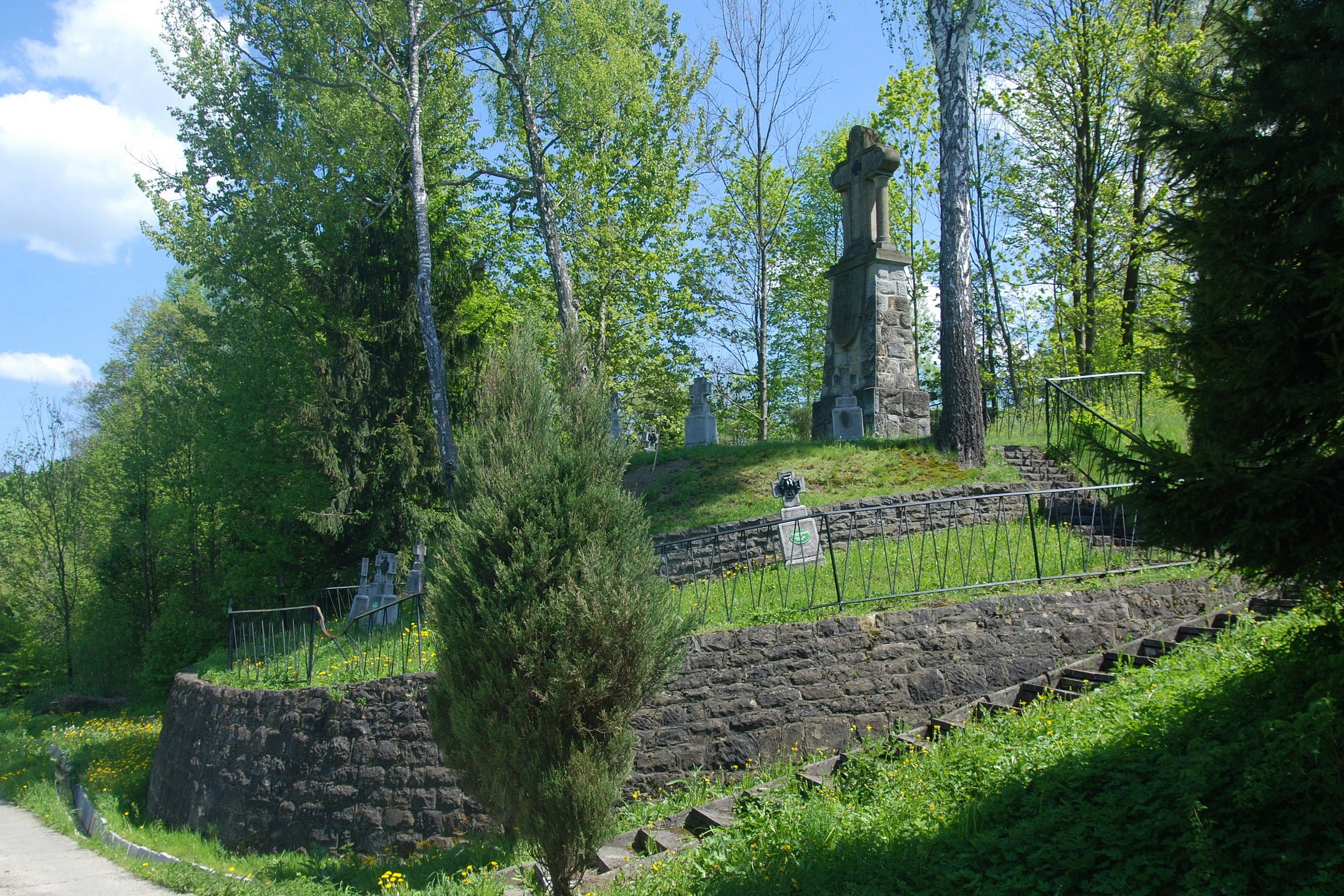
- War cemetery

- Location within Poland
- Coordinates: 49°36′N 20°49′E
- Country: Poland
- Voivodeship: Lesser Poland
- County: Nowy Sącz
- Gmina: Kamionka Wielka

Królowa Polska [kruˈlɔva ˈpɔlska] is a village in the administrative district of Gmina Kamionka Wielka, within Nowy Sącz County, Lesser Poland Voivodeship, in southern Poland.
