= Składziste =

- Village
- Location within Poland
- Coordinates: 49°31′N 20°49′E
- Country: Poland
- Voivodeship: Lesser Poland
- County: Nowy Sącz
- Gmina: Łabowa

Składziste [skwaˈd͡ʑistɛ] (Ukrainian: Складисте, Skladyste) is a village in the administrative district of Gmina Łabowa, within Nowy Sącz County, Lesser Poland Voivodeship, in southern Poland.
