= Mystków =

- Village
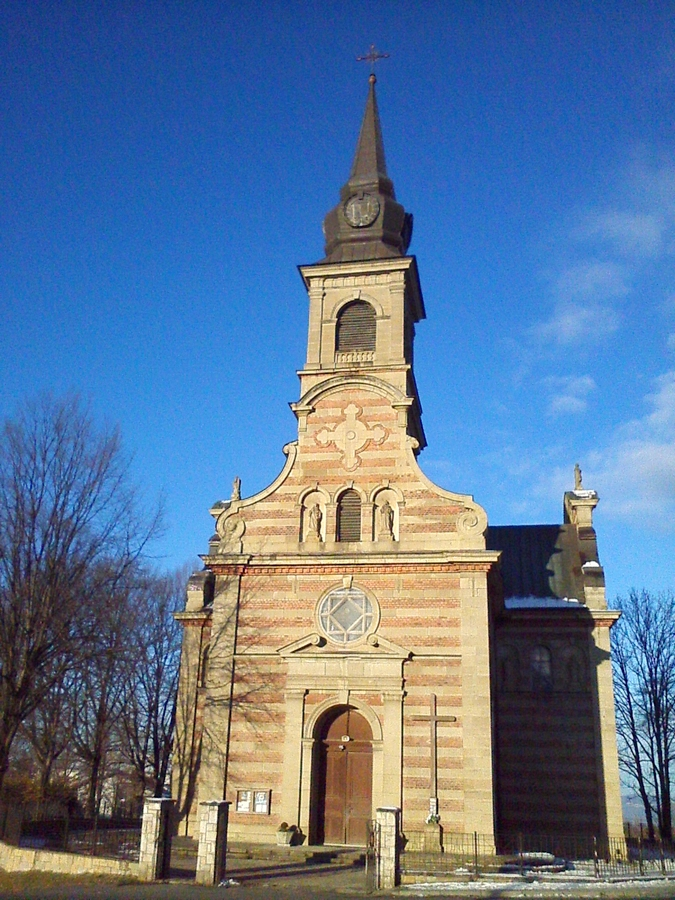
- Catholic church

- Location within Poland
- Coordinates: 49°37′N 20°48′E
- Country: Poland
- Voivodeship: Lesser Poland
- County: Nowy Sącz
- Gmina: Kamionka Wielka
- Population: 2,200

Mystków [ˈmɨstkuf] is a village in the administrative district of Gmina Kamionka Wielka, within Nowy Sącz County, Lesser Poland Voivodeship, in southern Poland.
