= Czaczów =

Village in Lesser Poland Voivodeship, Poland

- Village
- Location within Poland
- Coordinates: 49°32′N 20°48′E
- Country: Poland
- Voivodeship: Lesser Poland
- County: Nowy Sącz
- Gmina: Łabowa

Czaczów [ˈt͡ʂat͡ʂuf] (Note: Lemko Rusyn: Чачів, romanized: Chachiv) is a village in the administrative district of Gmina Łabowa, within Nowy Sącz County, Lesser Poland Voivodeship, in southern Poland.
