= Mszalnica =

- Village
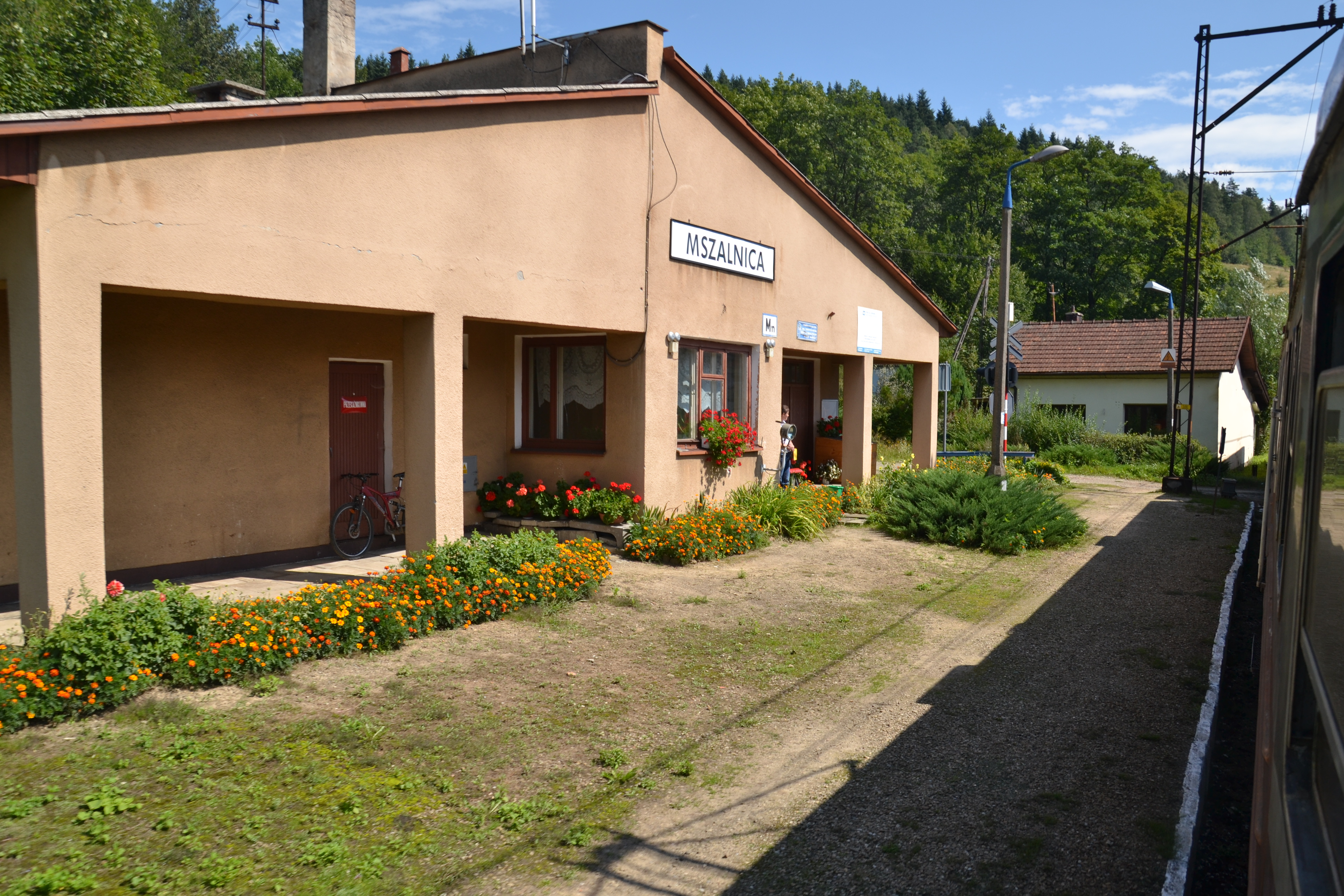
- Railway station

- Location within Poland
- Coordinates: 49°35′N 20°48′E
- Country: Poland
- Voivodeship: Lesser Poland
- County: Nowy Sącz
- Gmina: Kamionka Wielka
- Population (approx.): 1,000

Mszalnica [mʂalˈɲit͡sa] is a village in the administrative district of Gmina Kamionka Wielka, within Nowy Sącz County, Lesser Poland Voivodeship, in southern Poland.

The village has an approximate population of 1,000.
