= Świniarsko =

- Village
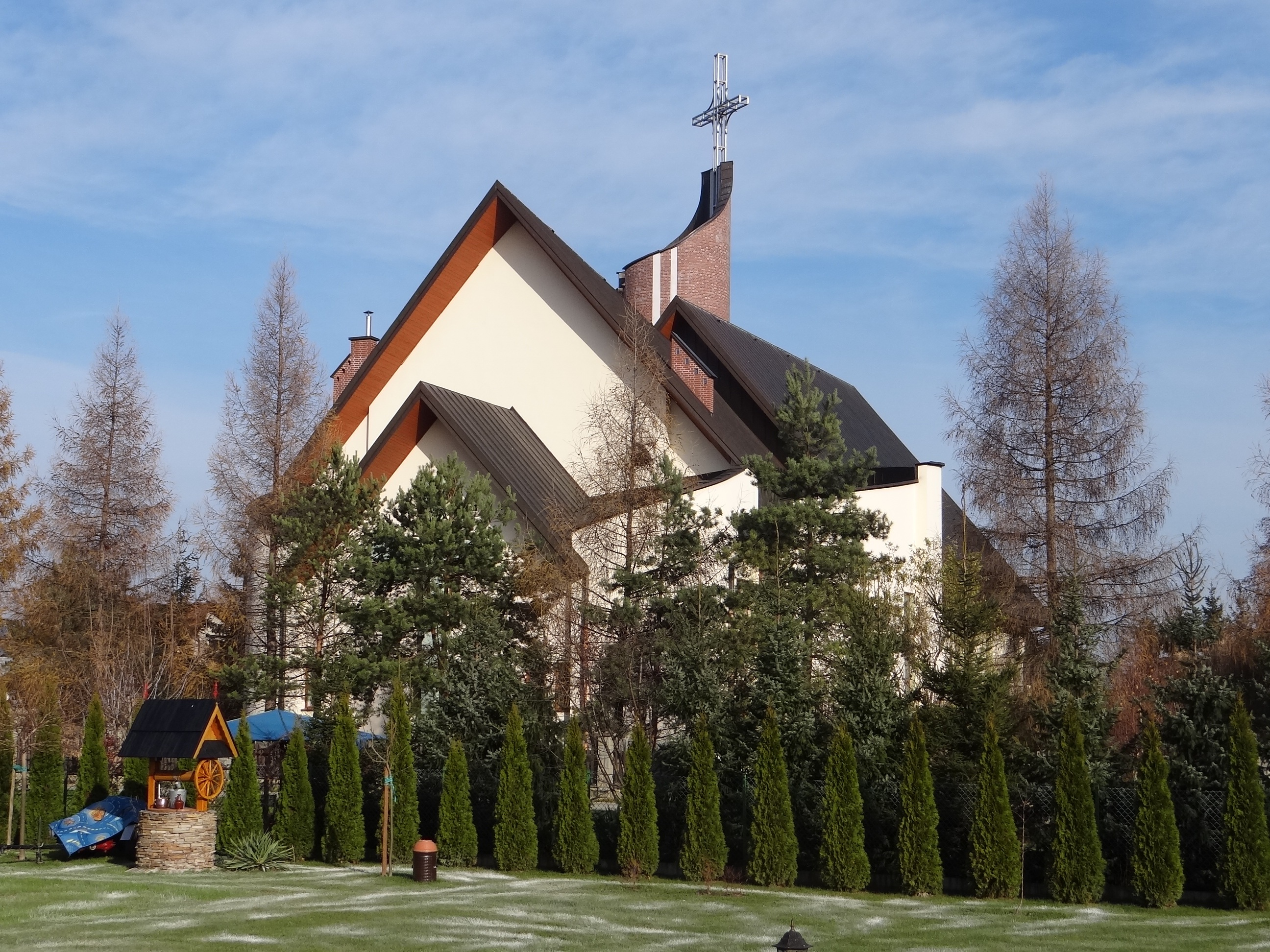
- Catholic church

- Location within Poland
- Coordinates: 49°36′18″N 20°39′12″E
- Country: Poland
- Voivodeship: Lesser Poland
- County: Nowy Sącz
- Gmina: Chełmiec
- Population: 2,416

Świniarsko [ɕfiˈɲarskɔ] is a village in the administrative district of Gmina Chełmiec, within Nowy Sącz County, Lesser Poland Voivodeship, in southern Poland.
