= Kokuszka =

- Village
- Location within Poland
- Coordinates: 49°28′N 20°44′E
- Country: Poland
- Voivodeship: Lesser Poland
- County: Nowy Sącz
- Gmina: Piwniczna-Zdrój
- Population: 640

Kokuszka [kɔˈkuʂka] is a village in the administrative district of Gmina Piwniczna-Zdrój, within Nowy Sącz County, Lesser Poland Voivodeship, in southern Poland, close to the border with Slovakia.
