= Frycowa =

- Village
- Location within Poland
- Coordinates: 49°33′N 20°47′E
- Country: Poland
- Voivodeship: Lesser Poland
- County: Nowy Sącz
- Gmina: Nawojowa

Frycowa [frɨˈt͡sɔva] is a village in the administrative district of Gmina Nawojowa within Nowy Sącz County, Lesser Poland Voivodeship in southern Poland.
