= Gmina Rytro =

Gmina Rytro Rytro Commune
- Gmina
- Coat of arms
- Interactive map of Gmina Rytro
- Coordinates (Rytro): 49°29′24″N 20°40′4″E
- Country: Poland
- Voivodeship: Lesser Poland
- County: Nowy Sącz County
- Seat: Rytro

Area
  - Total: 41.92 km^{2} (16.19 sq mi)

Population (2006)
  - Total: 3,619
  - Density: 86.33/km^{2} (223.6/sq mi)
- Website: http://www.rytro.sacz.pl

Gmina Rytro is a rural gmina (administrative district) in Nowy Sącz County, Lesser Poland Voivodeship, in southern Poland. Its seat is the village of Rytro, which lies approximately 16 kilometres (10 mi) south of Nowy Sącz and 83 km (52 mi) south-east of the regional capital Kraków.

The gmina covers an area of 41.92 square kilometres (16.2 sq mi), and as of 2006 its total population is 3,619.

== Villages ==
The gmina contains the villages of Obłazy Ryterskie, Roztoka Ryterska, Rytro, Sucha Struga and Życzanów.

== Neighbouring gminas ==
Gmina Rytro is bordered by the town of Szczawnica and by the gminas of Nawojowa, Piwniczna-Zdrój and Stary Sącz.
