= Chełmiec, Lesser Poland Voivodeship =

Chełmiec
- Village
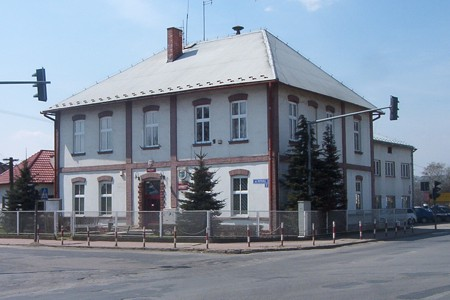
- Gmina office building

- Location within Poland
- Coordinates: 49°37′45″N 20°40′2″E
- Country: Poland
- Voivodeship: Lesser Poland
- County: Nowy Sącz
- Gmina: Chełmiec
- Population: 2,657

Chełmiec [ˈxɛu̯mjɛt͡s] is a village in Nowy Sącz County, Lesser Poland Voivodeship, in southern Poland. It is the seat of the gmina (administrative district) called Gmina Chełmiec.
