= Krzyżówka, Lesser Poland Voivodeship =

Krzyżówka
- Village
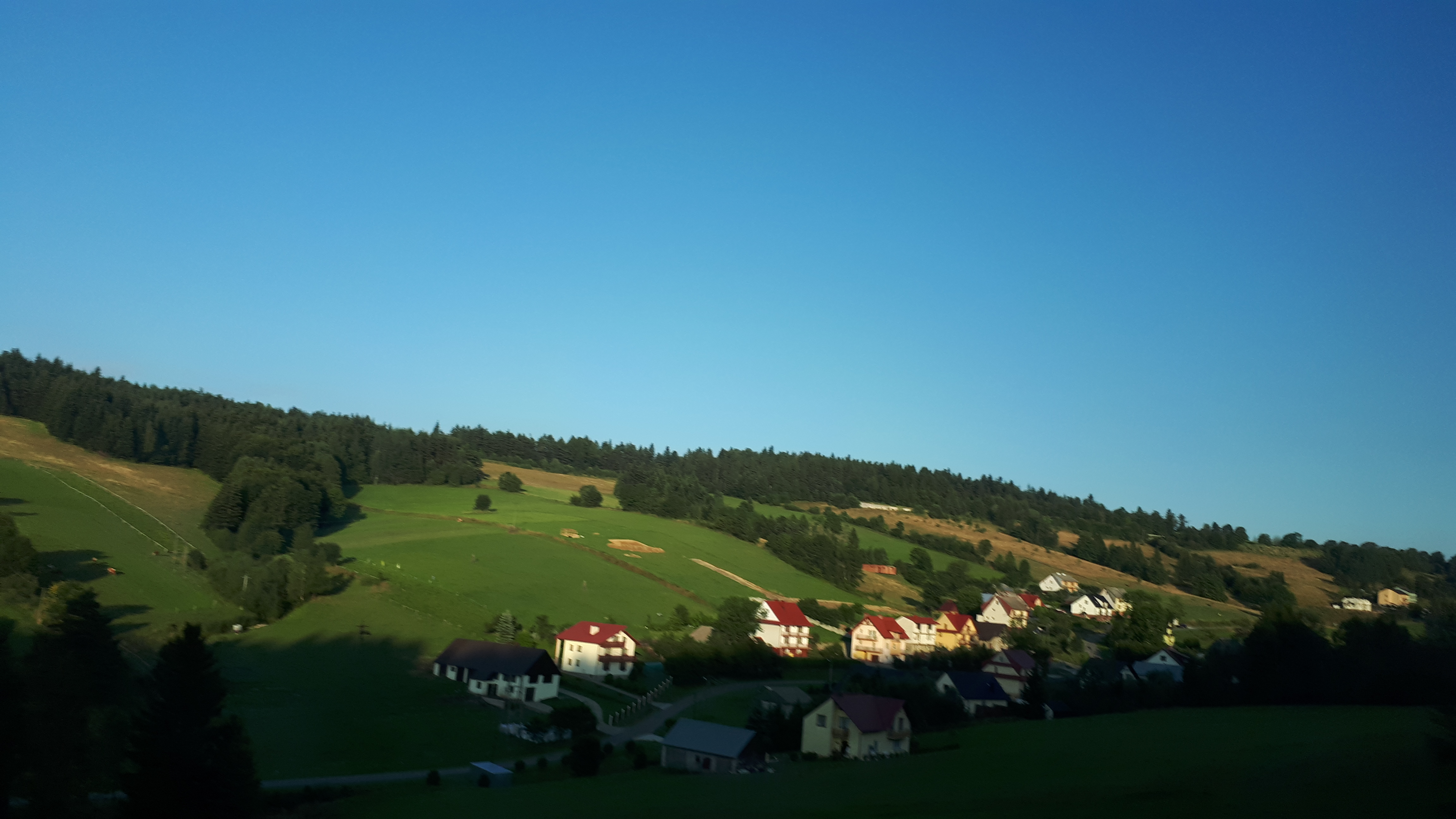

- Location within Poland
- Coordinates: 49°29′N 20°57′E
- Country: Poland
- Voivodeship: Lesser Poland
- County: Nowy Sącz
- Gmina: Łabowa

Krzyżówka is a village in the administrative district of Gmina Łabowa, within Nowy Sącz County, Lesser Poland Voivodeship, in southern Poland.
