= Gmina Łabowa =

Gmina Łabowa Łabowa Commune
- Gmina
- Flag Coat of arms
- Interactive map of Gmina Łabowa
- Coordinates (Łabowa): 49°32′N 20°52′E
- Country: Poland
- Voivodeship: Lesser Poland Voivodeship
- County: Nowy Sącz County
- Seat: Łabowa

Area
  - Total: 119.12 km^{2} (45.99 sq mi)

Population (2006)
  - Total: 5,172
  - Density: 43.42/km^{2} (112.5/sq mi)
- Website: https://labowa.pl/

Gmina Łabowa is a rural gmina (administrative district) in Nowy Sącz County, Lesser Poland Voivodeship, in southern Poland. Its seat is the village of Łabowa, which lies approximately 16 kilometres (10 mi) south-east of Nowy Sącz and 89 km (55 mi) south-east of the regional capital Kraków.

The gmina covers an area of 119.12 square kilometres (46.0 sq mi), and as of 2006 its total population is 5,172.

== Villages ==
Gmina Łabowa contains the villages and settlements of Barnowiec, Czaczów, Kamianna, Kotów, Krzyżówka, Łabowa, Łabowiec, Łosie, Maciejowa, Nowa Wieś, Roztoka Wielka, Składziste and Uhryń.

== Neighbouring gminas ==
Gmina Łabowa is bordered by the gminas of Grybów, Kamionka Wielka, Krynica-Zdrój, Muszyna, Nawojowa and Piwniczna-Zdrój.
