= Kunów, Lesser Poland Voivodeship =

Kunów
- Village
- Location within Poland
- Coordinates: 49°35′36″N 20°45′4″E
- Country: Poland
- Voivodeship: Lesser Poland
- County: Nowy Sącz
- Gmina: Chełmiec
- Population: 366

Kunów [ˈkunuf] is a village in the administrative district of Gmina Chełmiec, within Nowy Sącz County, Lesser Poland Voivodeship, in southern Poland.
