= Barnowiec, Lesser Poland Voivodeship =

Barnowiec
- Village
- Location within Poland
- Coordinates: 49°31′N 20°47′E
- Country: Poland
- Voivodeship: Lesser Poland
- County: Nowy Sącz
- Gmina: Łabowa

Barnowiec [barˈnɔvʲɛt͡s] (Note: Rusyn: Барновец, Barnovets) is a village in the administrative district of Gmina Łabowa, within Nowy Sącz County, Lesser Poland Voivodeship, in southern Poland.

The Barnowiec Nature Reserve
