= Gmina Piwniczna-Zdrój =

Gmina Piwniczna-Zdrój Piwniczna-Zdrój Commune
- Gmina
- Flag Coat of arms
- Interactive map of Gmina Piwniczna-Zdrój
- Coordinates (Piwniczna-Zdrój): 49°26′7″N 20°42′41″E
- Country: Poland
- Voivodeship: Lesser Poland
- County: Nowy Sącz County
- Seat: Piwniczna-Zdrój

Area
  - Total: 126.7 km^{2} (48.9 sq mi)

Population (2006)
  - Total: 10,313
  - Density: 81.40/km^{2} (210.8/sq mi)
  - Urban: 5,717
  - Rural: 4,596
- Website: http://www.piwniczna.pl

Gmina Piwniczna-Zdrój is an urban-rural gmina (administrative district) in Nowy Sącz County, Lesser Poland Voivodeship, in southern Poland, on the Slovak border. Its seat is the town of Piwniczna-Zdrój, which lies approximately 21 kilometres (13 mi) south of Nowy Sącz and 89 km (55 mi) south-east of the regional capital Kraków.

The gmina covers an area of 126.7 square kilometres (48.9 sq mi), and as of 2006 its total population is 10,313 (out of which the population of Piwniczna-Zdrój amounts to 5,717, and the population of the rural part of the gmina is 4,596).

== Villages ==
Apart from the town of Piwniczna-Zdrój, Gmina Piwniczna-Zdrój contains the villages and settlements of Głębokie, Kokuszka, Łomnica-Zdrój, Młodów, Wierchomla Mała, Wierchomla Wielka and Zubrzyk.

== Neighbouring gminas ==
Gmina Piwniczna-Zdrój is bordered by the town of Szczawnica and by the gminas of Łabowa, Muszyna, Nawojowa and Rytro. It also borders Slovakia.
