= Gmina Nawojowa =

Gmina Nawojowa Nawojowa Commune
- Gmina
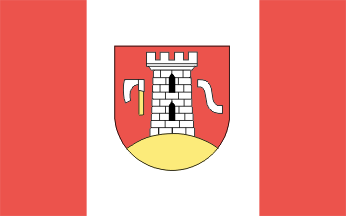
- Flag Coat of arms
- Interactive map of Gmina Nawojowa
- Coordinates (Nawojowa): 49°33′34″N 20°44′31″E
- Country: Poland
- Voivodeship: Lesser Poland
- County: Nowy Sącz County
- Seat: Nawojowa

Area
  - Total: 51.13 km^{2} (19.74 sq mi)

Population (2006)
  - Total: 7,644
  - Density: 149.5/km^{2} (387.2/sq mi)
- Website: http://www.nawojowa.sacz.pl

Gmina Nawojowa is a rural gmina (administrative district) in Nowy Sącz County, Lesser Poland Voivodeship, in southern Poland. Its seat is the village of Nawojowa, which lies approximately 8 kilometres (5 mi) south-east of Nowy Sącz and 81 km (50 mi) south-east of the regional capital Kraków.

The gmina covers an area of 51.13 square kilometres (19.7 sq mi), and as of 2006 its total population is 7,644.

== Villages ==
Gmina Nawojowa contains the villages and settlements of Bącza Kunina, Frycowa, Homrzyska, Nawojowa, Popardowa, Żeleźnikowa Mała, Żeleźnikowa Wielka and Złotne.

== Neighbouring gminas ==
Gmina Nawojowa is bordered by the city of Nowy Sącz and by the gminas of Kamionka Wielka, Łabowa, Piwniczna-Zdrój, Rytro and Stary Sącz.
