= Symbols of Nowy Sącz County =

The coat of arms of Nowy Sącz County.

The flag of Nowy Sącz County.

The coat of arms and the flag of the Nowy Sącz County, Poland are divided into two vertical fields. The left field is further divided into six horizontal stripes that alternate between red and yellow (golden) colours. The right field is red, featuring yellow (golden) six-armed stars, divided into three horizontal rows, each containing three stars. They were adopted in 1999, and based on the historical design dating back at least to the 16th century.

== Design ==
The coat of arms of Nowy Sącz County, Poland consists of an Iberian style escutcheon, with square top and rounded base, that is divided into two vertical fields. The left field is further divided into six horizontal stripes that alternate between red and yellow (golden) colours. The right field is red, featuring yellow (golden) six-armed stars, divided into three horizontal rows, each containing three stars.

The flag of the county is a rectangular banner of arms, that is divided into two vertical fields. The left field is further divided into six horizontal stripes that alternate between red and yellow colours. The right field is red, featuring yellow six-armed stars, divided into three horizontal rows, each containing three stars.

== History ==
The coat of arms originated as the symbol of the Sącz Land, and was related to the coat of arms of the Sandomierz Voivodeship. First known mention of its design comes from the Universal Chronicle by historian Marcin Bielski, published in 1551. In it, he described it being flown as banner of arms during the funeral of Sigismund I the Old in 1548.

The coat of arms and the flag were adopted as the symbol of Nowy Sącz County on 31 May 1999.
