= Gmina Kamionka Wielka =

Gmina Kamionka Wielka Kamionka Wielka Commune
- Gmina
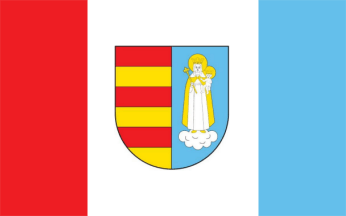
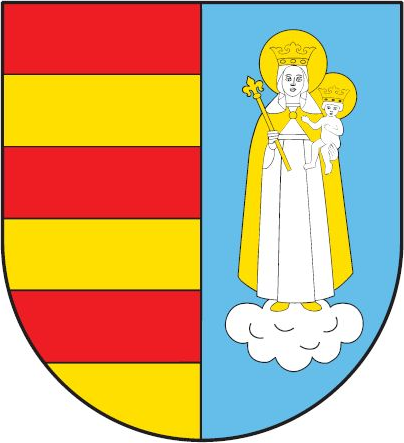
- Flag Coat of arms
- Interactive map of Gmina Kamionka Wielka
- Coordinates (Kamionka Wielka): 49°34′39″N 20°47′10″E
- Country: Poland
- Voivodeship: Lesser Poland
- County: Nowy Sącz County
- Seat: Kamionka Wielka

Area
  - Total: 63.01 km^{2} (24.33 sq mi)

Population (2024)
  - Total: 10,740
  - Density: 170.4/km^{2} (441.5/sq mi)
- Website: http://www.kamionka.sacz.pl

Gmina Kamionka Wielka is a rural gmina (administrative district) in Nowy Sącz County, Lesser Poland Voivodeship, in southern Poland. Its seat is the village of Kamionka Wielka, which lies approximately 9 kilometres (6 mi) south-east of Nowy Sącz and 82 km (51 mi) south-east of the regional capital Kraków.

The gmina covers an area of 63.01 square kilometres (24.3 sq mi), and as of 2024 its total population is 10740.

== Villages ==
Gmina Kamionka Wielka contains the villages and settlements of Bogusza, Jamnica, Kamionka Mała, Kamionka Wielka, Królowa Górna, Królowa Polska, Mszalnica, Mystków and Zagóry.

== Neighbouring gminas ==
Gmina Kamionka Wielka is bordered by the city of Nowy Sącz and by the gminas of Chełmiec, Grybów, Łabowa and Nawojowa.
