= Piątkowa, Lesser Poland Voivodeship =

Piątkowa
- Village
- Location within Poland
- Coordinates: 49°37′11″N 20°44′53″E
- Country: Poland
- Voivodeship: Lesser Poland
- County: Nowy Sącz
- Gmina: Chełmiec
- Population: 1,423

Piątkowa [pjɔntˈkɔva] is a village in the administrative district of Gmina Chełmiec, within Nowy Sącz County, Lesser Poland Voivodeship, in southern Poland.
