= Rytro =

- Village
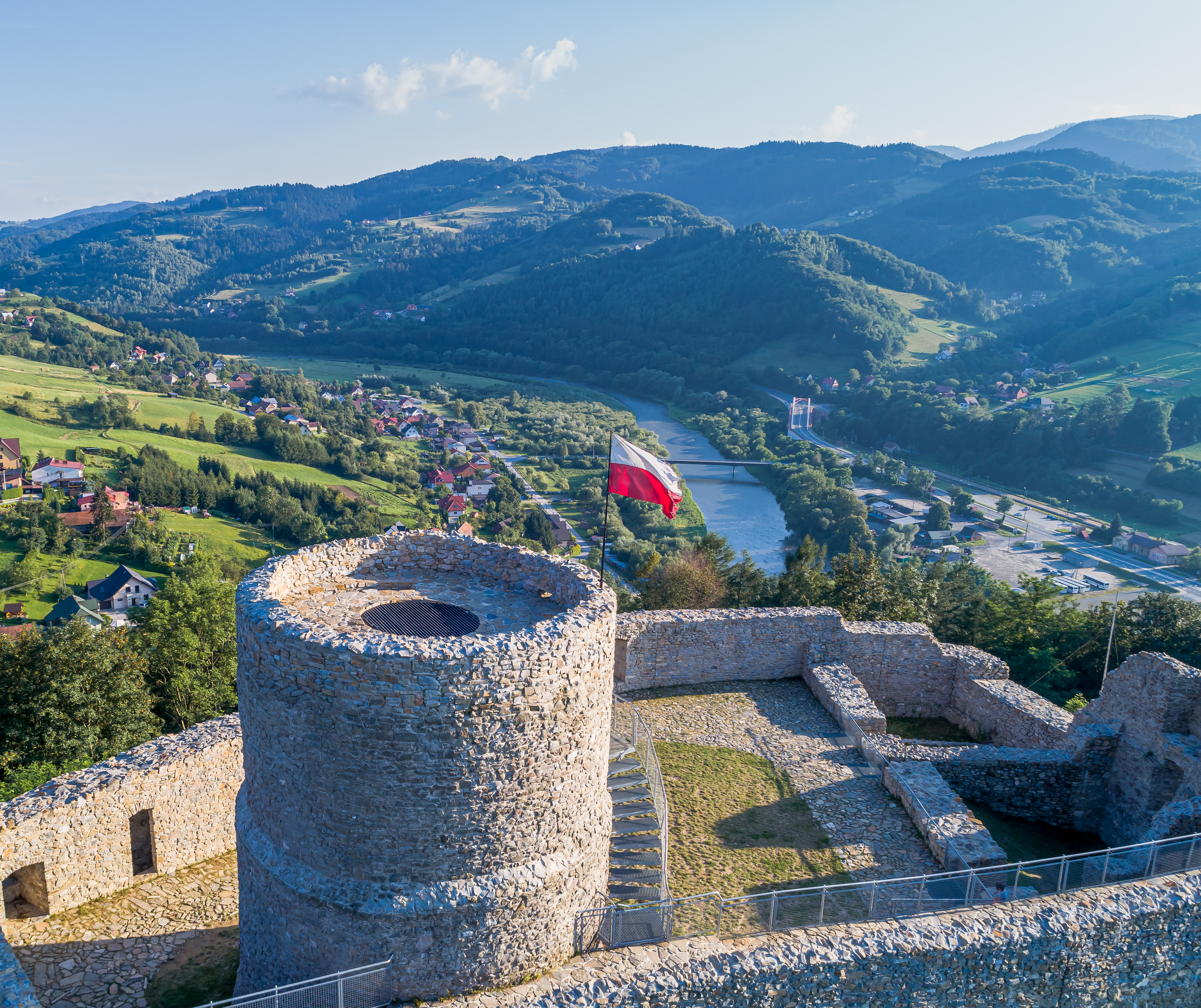
- Castle ruins

- Location within Poland
- Coordinates: 49°29′24″N 20°40′4″E
- Country: Poland
- Voivodeship: Lesser Poland
- County: Nowy Sącz
- Gmina: Rytro
- Population: 3,500
- Website: http://www.rytro.pl

Rytro [ˈrɨtrɔ] is a village in Nowy Sącz County, Lesser Poland Voivodeship, in southern Poland. It is the seat of the gmina (administrative district) called Gmina Rytro.
