= Klimkówka, Nowy Sącz County =

Klimkówka
- Village
- Location within Poland
- Coordinates: 49°40′42″N 20°43′51″E
- Country: Poland
- Voivodeship: Lesser Poland
- County: Nowy Sącz
- Gmina: Chełmiec
- Population: 275

Klimkówka [klʲimˈkufka] is a village in the administrative district of Gmina Chełmiec, within Nowy Sącz County, Lesser Poland Voivodeship, at the western end of the Low Beskid Mountains, in southern Poland.

The village had a population of 275 in 2004.

Klimkówka was founded on the initiative of the powerful Wielogłów family at the turn of the fifteenth and sixteenth centuries, its fortunes reflected those of the dynasty for the next three centuries.
