= Kamionka Wielka =

- Village
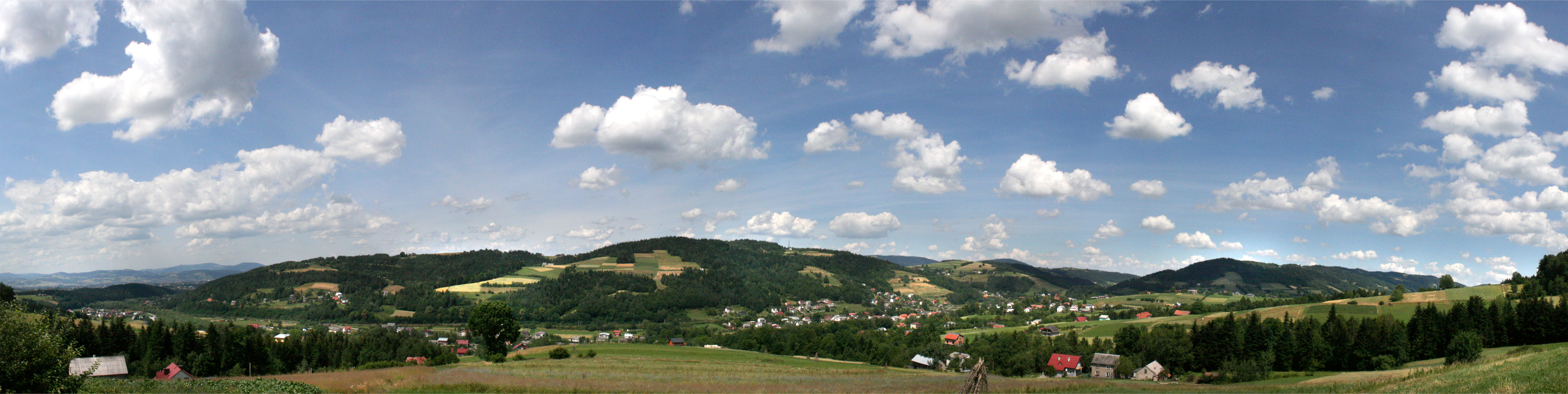

- Location within Poland
- Coordinates: 49°34′39″N 20°47′10″E
- Country: Poland
- Voivodeship: Lesser Poland
- County: Nowy Sącz
- Gmina: Kamionka Wielka
- Population: 2,925

Kamionka Wielka [kaˈmʲɔŋka ˈvʲɛlka] is a village in Nowy Sącz County, Lesser Poland Voivodeship, in southern Poland. It is the seat of the gmina (administrative district) called Gmina Kamionka Wielka.
