= Łabowa =

- Village
- Location within Poland
- Coordinates: 49°31′39″N 20°51′19″E
- Country: Poland
- Voivodeship: Lesser Poland
- County: Nowy Sącz
- Gmina: Łabowa
- Population: 6,005

Łabowa [waˈbɔva] is a village in Nowy Sącz County, Lesser Poland Voivodeship, in southern Poland. It is the seat of the gmina (administrative district) called Gmina Łabowa.
