= Gmina Chełmiec =

Gmina Chełmiec Chełmiec Commune
- Gmina
- Flag Coat of arms
- Interactive map of Gmina Chełmiec
- Coordinates (Chełmiec): 49°37′45″N 20°40′2″E
- Country: Poland
- Voivodeship: Lesser Poland
- County: Nowy Sącz County
- Seat: Chełmiec

Area
  - Total: 112.01 km^{2} (43.25 sq mi)

Population (2006)
  - Total: 24,473
  - Density: 218.49/km^{2} (565.89/sq mi)
- Website: http://www.chelmiec.pl

Gmina Chełmiec is a rural gmina (administrative district) in Nowy Sącz County, Lesser Poland Voivodeship, in southern Poland. Its seat is the village of Chełmiec, which lies approximately 3 kilometres (2 mi) west of Nowy Sącz and 71 km (44 mi) south-east of the regional capital Kraków.

The gmina covers an area of 112.01 square kilometres (43.2 sq mi), and as of 2006 its total population is 24,473.

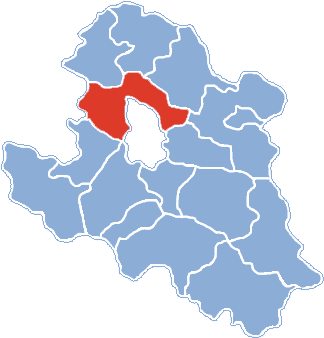
Location of Chełmiec Commune on Nowy Sącz County map, Poland.

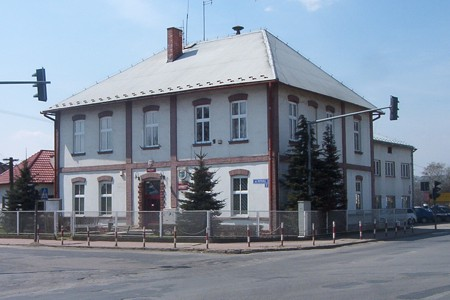
Chełmiec Commune Hall

== Villages ==
Gmina Chełmiec contains the villages and settlements of Biczyce Dolne, Biczyce Górne, Chełmiec, Chomranice, Dąbrowa, Januszowa, Klęczany, Klimkówka, Krasne Potockie, Kunów, Kurów, Librantowa, Marcinkowice, Naściszowa, Niskowa, Paszyn, Piątkowa, Rdziostów, Świniarsko, Trzetrzewina, Ubiad, Wielogłowy, Wielopole, Wola Kurowska and Wola Marcinkowska.

== Neighbouring gminas ==
Gmina Chełmiec is bordered by the gminas of Gródek nad Dunajcem, Grybów, Kamionka Wielka, Korzenna, Limanowa, Łososina Dolna and Podegrodzie.
