= Nowy Sącz County =

Nowy Sącz County Powiat nowosądecki
- County
- Flag Coat of arms

- Location within the voivodeship

- Division into gminas
- Coordinates (Nowy Sącz): 49°37′26″N 20°41′50″E
- Country: Poland
- Voivodeship: Lesser Poland
- Seat: Nowy Sącz
- Gminas: Total 16 (incl. 1 urban): Grybów; Gmina Chełmiec; Gmina Gródek nad Dunajcem; Gmina Grybów; Gmina Kamionka Wielka; Gmina Korzenna; Gmina Krynica-Zdrój; Gmina Łabowa; Gmina Łącko; Gmina Łososina Dolna; Gmina Muszyna; Gmina Nawojowa; Gmina Piwniczna-Zdrój; Gmina Podegrodzie; Gmina Rytro; Gmina Stary Sącz

Area
  - Total: 1,550.24 km^{2} (598.55 sq mi)

Population (2006)
  - Total: 197,718
  - Density: 127.540/km^{2} (330.328/sq mi)
  - Urban: 36,952
  - Rural: 160,766
- Car plates: KNS
- Website: www.sacz.pl

Nowy Sącz County (Polish: powiat nowosądecki) is a unit of territorial administration and local government (powiat) in Lesser Poland Voivodeship, southern Poland, on the Slovak border. It came into being on January 1, 1999, as a result of the Polish local government reforms passed in 1998. Its administrative seat is the city of Nowy Sącz, although the city is not part of the county (it constitutes a separate city county). The county contains five towns: Krynica-Zdrój, 31 km (19 mi) south-east of Nowy Sącz, Stary Sącz, 9 km (6 mi) south-west of Nowy Sącz, Grybów, 19 km (12 mi) east of Nowy Sącz, Piwniczna-Zdrój, 21 km (13 mi) south of Nowy Sącz, and Muszyna, 33 km (21 mi) south-east of Nowy Sącz.

The county covers an area of 1,550.24 square kilometres (598.6 sq mi). As of 2006 its total population is 197,718, out of which the population of Krynica-Zdrój is 11,243, that of Stary Sącz is 8,987, that of Grybów is 6,025, that of Piwniczna-Zdrój is 5,717, that of Muszyna is 4,980, and the rural population is 160,766.

== Neighbouring counties ==
Apart from the city of Nowy Sącz, Nowy Sącz County is also bordered by Nowy Targ County and Limanowa County to the west, Brzesko County and Tarnów County to the north, and Gorlice County to the east. It also borders Slovakia to the south.

== Administrative division ==
The county is subdivided into 16 gminas (one urban, four urban-rural and 11 rural). These are listed in the following table, in descending order of population.

Gmina	Type	Area (km^{2})	Population (2006)	Seat
Gmina Chełmiec	rural	112.0	24,473	Chełmiec
Gmina Grybów	rural	153.0	22,436	Grybów *
Gmina Stary Sącz	urban-rural	102.4	22,206	Stary Sącz
Gmina Krynica-Zdrój	urban-rural	145.3	16,850	Krynica-Zdrój
Gmina Łącko	rural	133.0	14,835	Łącko
Gmina Korzenna	rural	106.8	13,377	Korzenna
Gmina Podegrodzie	rural	63.7	11,607	Podegrodzie
Gmina Muszyna	urban-rural	142.0	11,293	Muszyna
Gmina Piwniczna-Zdrój	urban-rural	126.7	10,313	Piwniczna-Zdrój
Gmina Łososina Dolna	rural	84.3	9,814	Łososina Dolna
Gmina Kamionka Wielka	rural	63.0	9,158	Kamionka Wielka
Gmina Gródek nad Dunajcem	rural	88.2	8,896	Gródek nad Dunajcem
Gmina Nawojowa	rural	51.1	7,644	Nawojowa
Grybów	urban	17.0	6,025	
Gmina Łabowa	rural	119.1	5,172	Łabowa
Gmina Rytro	rural	41.9	3,619	Rytro
* seat not part of the gmina

== Nowy Sacz County in the Past ==
The history of Nowy Sacz County dates back to late 13th century, when King Wenceslaus II of Bohemia granted Magdeburg rights to Nowy Sacz. The new town quickly became most important administrative center of the region, and the seat of a local castellan and starosta. The county was probably established during the reign of King Kazimierz Wielki, who encouraged settlement in this sparsely populated region of his domain.

Until the Partitions of Poland, Nowy Sacz County belonged to Kraków Voivodeship. Its total area was 3900 sq. kilometers, with 12 towns (as for 1667), including Wojnicz, Czchow, Nowy Targ, Zakliczyn, Muszyna and Grybow.

After the first partition of Poland (1772), Nowy Sacz County became part of Austrian Galicia, in which it remained until 1918 (for more information, see Subdivisions of Galicia). In the Second Polish Republic, Nowy Sacz County was part of Kraków Voivodeship (1919–39); after World War II, the county remained part of Krakow Voivodeship until 1975, when all counties were disbanded (see Administrative division of the Polish People's Republic).
