= Jan Piotrowski =

21st-century Polish Catholic bishop

Mgr. Jan Piotrowski
- Bishop of Kielce
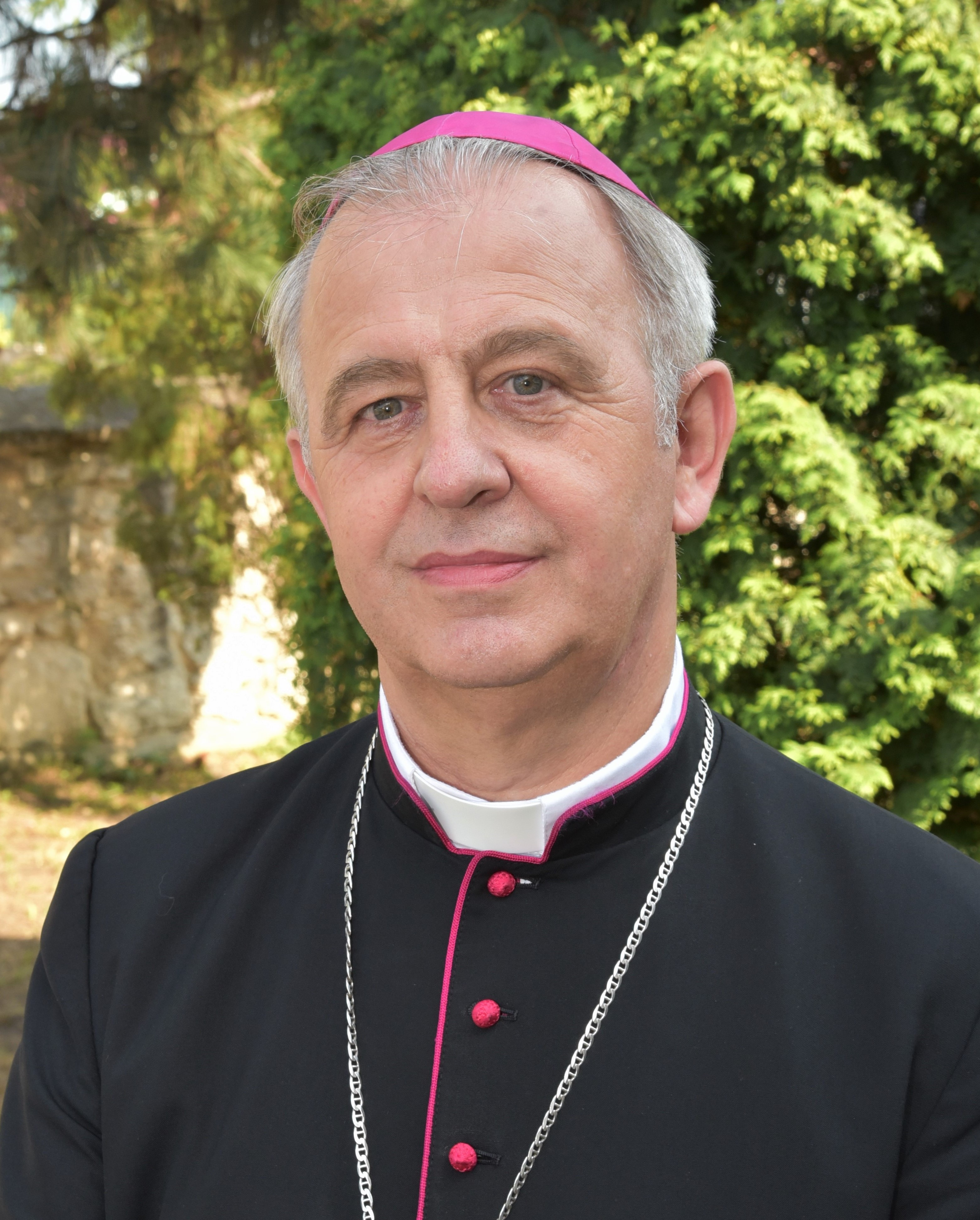
- Piotrowski in 2018
- Church: Roman Catholic Church
- Archdiocese: Kraków
- Diocese: Kielce
- In office: 2014 –
- Predecessor: Kazimierz Ryczan
- Previous posts: Auxiliary Bishop of Tarnów; Titular Bishop of Sinitis

Orders
- Ordination: 25 May 1980 by Jerzy Karol Ablewicz
- Consecration: 25 January 2014 by Andrzej Jeż
- Rank: Archbishop

Personal details
- Born: 5 January 1953 (age 73) Szczurowa, Poland
- Motto: In Caritate Evangelium Prædicare
- Coat of arms

Jan Piotrowski (born 5 January 1953) is a Polish Roman Catholic bishop, being the archbishop of the Roman Catholic Diocese of Kielce since 2014. He previously served as the auxiliary bishop of Tarnów and titular bishop of Sinitis from 2013 to 2014.

== Biography ==
=== Early life ===
Piotrowski was born on 5 January 1953 in Szczurowa. He studied at the High School in Radłów, where he passed the secondary school-leaving examination. In 1972, he began studying at the Major Seminary in Tarnów. He was ordained a priest on 25 May 1980 in the cathedral basilica of the Nativity of the Blessed Virgin Mary in Tarnów by the local diocesan bishop Jerzy Ablewicz. From 1992 to 1994, Piotrowski studied at the Catholic Institute in Paris from where he graduated with a bachelor's degree in theology. He obtained his doctoral degree in theology in the field of missionology in 1997 at the Faculty of Theology of the Academy of Catholic Theology in Warsaw, with his dissertation being the establishment and maturing of the Church in the Congolese land of Grand Niari.

=== Priestly ministry ===
From 1980 to 1982, Piotrowski worked as a priest and vicar in the parish of the Assumption of the Blessed Virgin Mary in Przecław, and then from 1982 to 1984, he was the priest of the parish of the Holy Spirit in Mielec. From 1984 to 1985, he papered for missionary work at the Mission Formation Center in Warsaw, and then, for five months, he studied French at the Alliance Française school in Paris. From 1985 to 1991, he conducted missionary work in the People's Republic of Congo. He helped start the new parish of the Holy Spirit in Kimongo District, of which he was a pastor from 1984 to 1985. Piotrowski also worked in the parish of conversion of Saint Paul in Loubomo, from 1985 to 1990. From 1991 to 1992 and 1994 to 1997, he was the national secretary of the Pontifical Work of Saint Peter the Apostle. From 1997 to 1998 and 1999 to 2000, he worked as a pastor in the parish of Santa Maria de Huachipa in the suburbs of Lima in Peru. For health reasons, he temporarily returned to the country, where he was appointed as administrative director and lecturer at the Catholic Center for Social Studies in Lipnica Murowana, as well as the administrator of the parish of St. Andrew in Lipnica Murowana. From 2000 to 2010, Piotrowski was the national director of the Pontifical Missionary Works in Poland, at the same time the editor-in-chief of the magazines Missions Today, World Missionary, and Light of Nations published by the Papal Missionary Works. From 2003 to 2009, he was a member of the Congregation for the Evangelization of Nations. In the years 2006–2010, he gave lectures commissioned on the history of missions and papal missionary works at the Cardinal Stefan Wyszyński University in Warsaw. He also lectured in formation at the Diocesan House of Missionary Formation Fr. Jan Czuba in Czchów. He became a member of the International Association of Catholic Missionaries (IACM), the Association of Polish Missionaries (SMP).

In 2009, he was appointed pastor of the parish of St. Małgorzata in Nowy Sącz. He took the position of dean of the Nowy Sącz deanery and was also a member of the pastoral and priesthood council. He was also appointed the provost of the Collegiate Chapter in Nowy Sącz.

=== Ordination as bishop ===
On 14 December 2013, Piotrowski was appointed by Pope Francis as the auxiliary bishop of the diocese of Tarnów as well as the titular bishop of Sinitis. He was ordained as a bishop on 28 September 2011 in the Cathedral Basilica of the Nativity of the Blessed Virgin Mary, with the consecrator being the bishop of Tarnów, Andrzej Jeż, with the co-consecrators being Celestino Migliore, the titular archbishop of Canosa, and Władysław Bobowski, the titular bishop of Abernethia. Piotrowski chose "In Caritate Evangelium Prædicare" (To preach the Gospel in love) as his bishop's motto.

On 11 October 2014, Pope Francis appointed Piotrowski as the new bishop of Kielce, replacing the retiring Kazimierz Ryczan. He was officially installed as bishop in the Cathedral Basilica of the Assaultumption of the Blessed Virgin Mary on 29 November 2014.

=== Life as bishop ===
As part of the work of the Polish Bishops' Conference, in 2017, Piotrowski became the chairman of the Team for Contacts with the French Bishops' Conference, and in 2019, the Economic Council.
