= Janecki =

Janecki (feminine: Janecka) is a Polish surname derived from a place named Janki or from the given name Jan. Notable people with the surname include:

- Janina Janecka (1893–1938), Polish actress
- Leonia Janecka (1909–2003), Polish painter
- Robert Janecki (born 1974), Polish yacht racer
- Ryszard Janecki (1919–2004), Polish footballer
- Władysław Janecki (1934–2023), Polish politician
