= Lipie =

Lipie may refer to the following places:

- Lipie, Kuyavian-Pomeranian Voivodeship (north-central Poland)
- Lipie, Kutno County in Łódź Voivodeship (central Poland)
- Lipie, Wałcz County in West Pomeranian Voivodeship (north-west Poland)
- Lipie, Pajęczno County in Łódź Voivodeship (central Poland)
- Lipie, Radomsko County in Łódź Voivodeship (central Poland)
- Lipie, Gmina Czerniewice, Tomaszów County in Łódź Voivodeship (central Poland)
- Lipie, Wieluń County in Łódź Voivodeship (central Poland)
- Lipie, Lesser Poland Voivodeship (south Poland)
- Lipie, Lubaczów County in Subcarpathian Voivodeship (south-east Poland)
- Lipie, Rzeszów County in Subcarpathian Voivodeship (south-east Poland)
- Lipie, Starachowice County in Świętokrzyskie Voivodeship (south-central Poland)
- Lipie, Włoszczowa County in Świętokrzyskie Voivodeship (south-central Poland)
- Lipie, Bieszczady County in Subcarpathian Voivodeship (south-east Poland)
- Lipie, Masovian Voivodeship (east-central Poland)
- Lipie, Gostyń County in Greater Poland Voivodeship (west-central Poland)
- Lipie, Kępno County in Greater Poland Voivodeship (west-central Poland)
- Lipie, Września County in Greater Poland Voivodeship (west-central Poland)
- Lipie, Częstochowa County in Silesian Voivodeship (south Poland)
- Lipie, Kłobuck County in Silesian Voivodeship (south Poland)
- Lipie, Myślibórz County in West Pomeranian Voivodeship (north-west Poland)
- Lipie, Świdwin County in West Pomeranian Voivodeship (north-west Poland)

and to:

- Lipie (bread), a Romanian bread
