= Władysław Bobowski =

Polish Roman Catholic bishop (1932–2025)

His Excellency Władysław Bobowski
- Auxiliary Bishop Emeritus of Tarnów
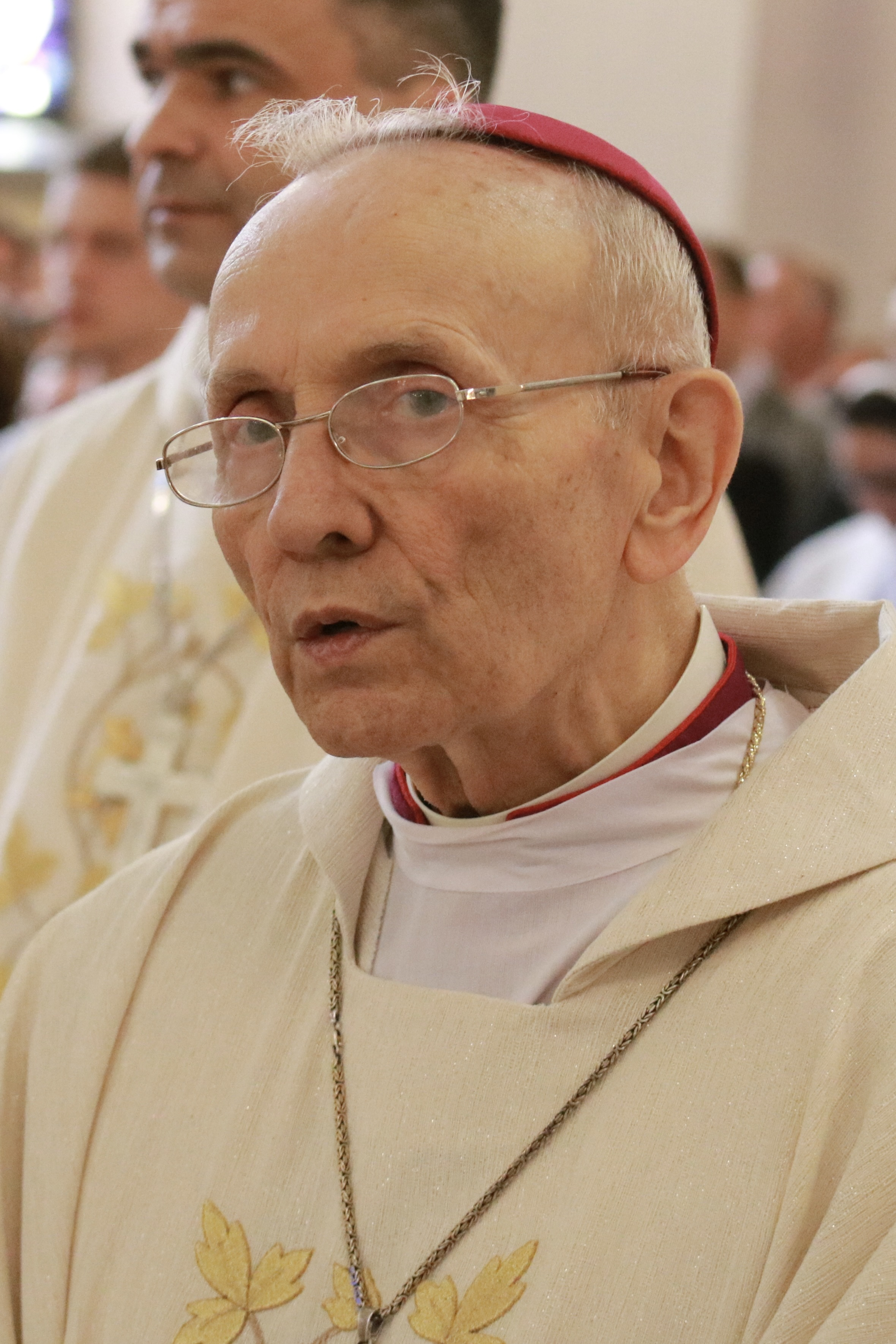
- Archdiocese: Kraków
- Diocese: Tarnów
- Appointed: 23 December 1974
- Term ended: 20 October 2009
- Other post: Titular Bishop of Abernethia (1974–2025)

Orders
- Ordination: 23 June 1957 by Karol Pękala
- Consecration: 2 February 1975 by Jerzy Karol Ablewicz

Personal details
- Born: 19 March 1932 Tropie, Poland
- Died: 8 July 2025 (aged 93)
- Motto: Humanum indivinare
- Coat of arms

Styles of Władysław Bobowski
- Reference style: His Excellency; The Most Reverend
- Spoken style: Your Excellency
- Religious style: Bishop

Władysław Bobowski (19 March 1932 – 8 July 2025) was a Polish Roman Catholic bishop.

== Biography ==
Bobowski was born on 19 March 1932, in Tropie. He passed his secondary school leaving exam externally in 1952 at the Bartłomiej Nowodworski High School in Kraków. From 1952 to 1957, he studied philosophy and theology at the Higher Seminary in Tarnów. He was ordained a subdeacon and deacon by the auxiliary bishop of Tarnów, Karol Pękala, who also ordained him a priest on 23 June 1957. He was incardinated in the diocese of Tarnów and from 1957 to 1961 he studied dogmatic theology at the Faculty of Theology of the Catholic University of Lublin. There, in 1960, he obtained a bachelor's degree and began a doctoral course. From 1963 to 1968, he studied at the Institute of Dogmatic Theology of the Pontifical Gregorian University in Rome, from which he graduated in 1969 with a doctorate in theological sciences in the field of theology of spiritual life on the basis of the dissertation The Nature of Christian Perfection According to Kasper Drużbicki SI.

From August to September 1957, he worked as a priest in the parish of St. Catherine in Ryglice. From May 1961 to June 1962, he was a catechist at the Cathedral of the Nativity of the Blessed Virgin Mary in Tarnów. In the years 1962–1963, he served as personal secretary and chaplain to the diocesan bishop Jerzy Ablewicz, at the same time performing the tasks of a curial notary. In the diocesan curia, he also held the position of censor of religious books. From March to August 1969 he was a prefect, and then until 1975 a spiritual father at the Major Seminary in Tarnów where in the years 1969–1999, he taught theology of the interior life.

On 23 December 1974, he was pre-canonized auxiliary bishop of the diocese of Tarnów with the titular see of Abernethia. He was ordained a bishop on 2 February 1975, in the Cathedral of the Nativity of the Blessed Virgin Mary in Tarnów.

In 2025, the President of the Republic of Poland, Andrzej Duda, awarded him the Knight's Cross of the Order of Polonia Restituta. He was awarded the title of honorary citizen of: Tarnów (2007), Ryglice commune (2008) and Gródek nad Dunajcem commune (2011). He was also awarded the Golden Badge of Honor of the Małopolska Voivodeship – the Cross of Małopolska in 2025.

Bobowski died on 8 July 2025, at the age of 93.

Catholic Church titles
Preceded by —	Auxiliary Bishop of Tarnów; 1974–2009	Succeeded by —
Preceded by First	Titular Bishop of Abernethia; 1974–2025	Succeeded by Vacant
