= Załuski =

Załuski may refer to the following places:

- Załuski, Grójec County in Masovian Voivodeship (east-central Poland)
- Załuski, Ostrołęka County in Masovian Voivodeship (east-central Poland)
- Załuski, Podlaskie Voivodeship (north-east Poland)
- Załuski, Płońsk County in Masovian Voivodeship (east-central Poland)
- Załuski, Warmian-Masurian Voivodeship (north Poland)
- Załuski, Warsaw, a neighbourhood of Warsaw, Masovian Voivodeship, Poland

== See also ==
- Załuski (surname)
