= Andrzej Jeż =

21st-century Polish Catholic bishop

Mgr. Andrzej Jeż
- Bishop of Tarnów
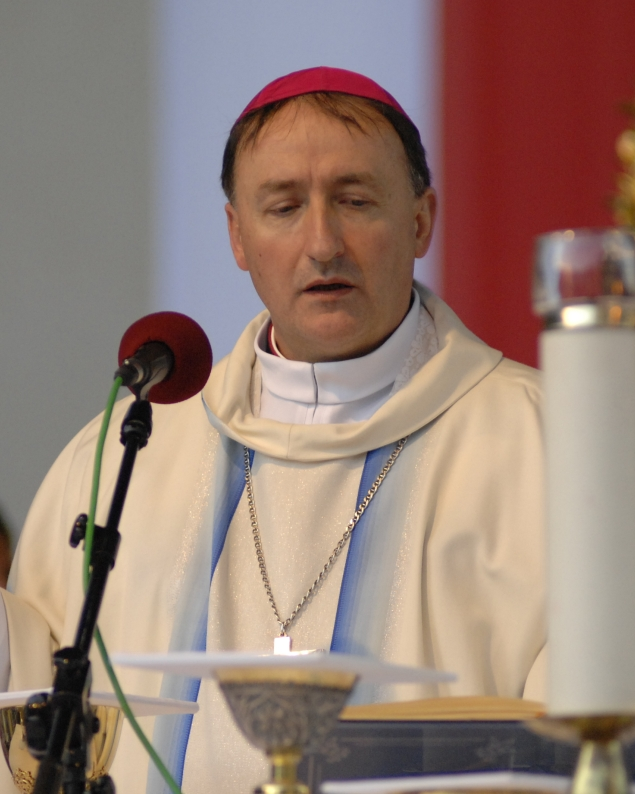
- Jeż in 2010
- Church: Roman Catholic Church
- Archdiocese: Kraków
- Diocese: Tarnów
- In office: 2012 –
- Predecessor: Władysław Bobowski
- Previous posts: Auxiliary Bishop of Tarnów; Titular Bishop of Tigillava

Orders
- Ordination: 19 April 1973 by Jerzy Karol Ablewicz
- Consecration: 6 January 1998 by Wiktor Paweł Skworc
- Rank: Archbishop

Personal details
- Born: 3 May 1963 (age 63) Limanowa, Poland
- Motto: Ad Laudem Trinitatis Et Deiparae
- Coat of arms

Andrzej Jeż (born 3 May 1963) is a Polish Roman Catholic bishop, being the bishop of the Roman Catholic Diocese of Tarnów since 2012. He was previously the auxiliary bishop of Tarnów and titular bishop of Tigillava from 2009 to 2012.

== Biography ==
=== Early life ===
Jeż was born on 3 May 1963 in Limanowa. He attended the local high school in Limanowa, and in 1982 he passed the secondary school-leaving examination. From 1982 to 1988 Jeż studied at the Major Seminary in Tarnów, and on 12 June 1988 he was ordained priest by Jerzy Ablewicz, the diocesan bishop of Tarnów. From 1993 to 1995 he completed specialist studies in homiletics at the Academy of Catholic Theology in Warsaw, which he completed with a licentiate. Jeż would continue his studies at the Pontifical Gregorian University in Rome. In 2002 at the Faculty of Theology of the Pontifical Academy of Theology in Krakow he obtained a doctorate in dogmatic theology based on the dissertation Christus Communicator. An attempt to build a Christological model based on the theory of interpersonal communication, written under the direction of Stanisław Budzik.

=== Priestly ministry ===
He worked as a priest and victor in the parishes in Krościenko nad Dunajcem from 1988 to 1991, and in Wierzchosławice from 1991 to 1993. In 2004 Jeż became a pastor of the parish of Saint Mary, the Queen of Poland, in Tarnów. At that time, he was dean of the Tarnów deanery and became a member of the diocesan council for the formation of clergy. In 2007 Jeż was transferred to the office of priest of the parish of St. Małgorzata in Nowy Sącz. In this position he became the dean of the deanery of Nowy Sącz, he became a member of the diocesan pastoral council, and was also appointed the canon and provost of the collegiate chapter in Nowy Sącz.

In 1996 Jeż was appointed a priest and professor at the Major Seminary in Tarnów, and from 1999 to 2007 he taught homiletics to seminarians of the diocese.

=== Ordination as bishop ===
On 20 October 2009, Jeż was appointed by Pope Benedict XVI as auxiliary bishop of the Diocese of Tarnów, as well as the titular bishop of Tigillava. He was ordained a bishop on 28 September 2011 in the Cathedral Basilica of the Nativity of the Blessed Virgin Mary, with the consecrator being the former bishop of Tarnów, Wiktor Paweł Skworc, with the co-consecrators cardinal Stanisław Dziwisz, archbishop of Kraków, and Józef Kowalczyk, archbishop of Gniezno. Jeż chose "Ad Laudem Trinitatis Et Deiparae" (To the praise and the Holy Trinity) as his bishop's motto.

On 12 May 2012 Pope Benedict XVI appointed Jeż as the new bishop of Tarnów, succeeding the retiring Władysław Bobowski. He was officially installed as bishop in the Cathedral Basilica of the Nativity of the Blessed Virgin Mary on 15 June 2013.

=== Life as Bishop ===
In 2016 Jeż convened the fifth synod in the history of the Diocese of Tarnów to address questions facing the diocese on matters such as canon law and parish problems.

On 18 February 2026, Jeż became the first bishop in Poland to be tried on sex-abuse charges involving Catholic clergy, after he was accused of failing to inform authorities about alleged sexual abuse of children by two priests in his diocese.
