= Lipje =

Lipje may refer to:

- Lipje, Bosnia and Herzegovina
- Lipje, Slovenia
- Lipje, Croatia, a village near Karlovac

== See also ==
- Lipie
