= Stanisława Anna Okularczyk =

Polish politician (born 1943)

member of Sejm 2005-2007
- In office 25 September 2005 – 2007

Personal details
- Born: 12 May 1943 (age 82)
- Party: Civic Platform

Stanisława Anna Okularczyk (born 12 May 1943 in Bujne) is a Polish politician. She was elected to the Sejm on 25 September 2005, getting 12,016 votes in 14 Nowy Sącz district as a candidate from the Law and Justice list.

== See also ==
- Members of Polish Sejm 2005-2007
