= Fabianów =

Fabianów may refer to places in Poland:

- Fabianów, Gmina Nowe Skalmierzyce, Ostrów County in Greater Poland Voivodeship (west-central Poland)
- Fabianów, Pleszew County in Greater Poland Voivodeship (west-central Poland)
- Fabianów, Masovian Voivodeship (east-central Poland)
