= Nowy Sącz Ghetto =

Nazi ghetto in occupied Poland

The Nowy Sącz Ghetto
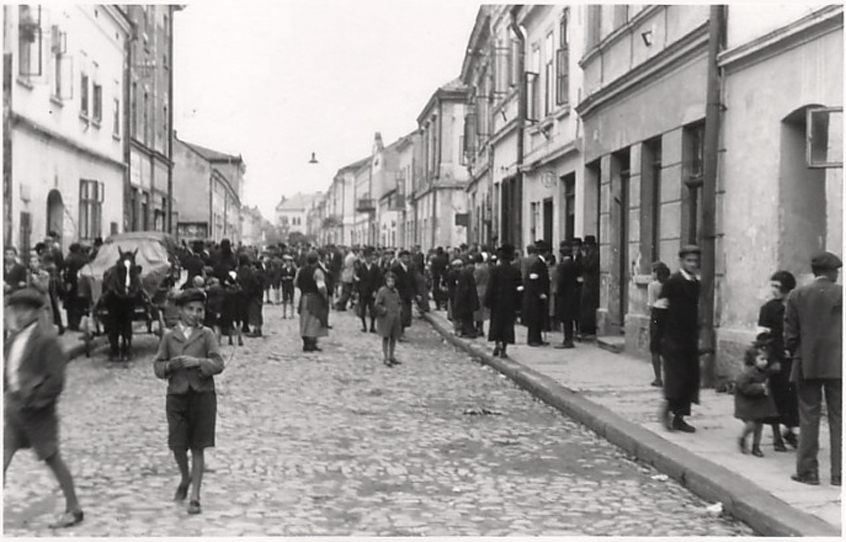
- Street in the Nowy Sącz Ghetto, c. 1941

- Nowy Sącz wartime location, south-east of Auschwitz during the Holocaust in occupied Poland

- Location of Nowy Sącz in Poland today
- Location: 49.6333°N 20.7166°E
- Date: 1939–1942
- Incident type: Imprisonment, mass shooting, forced labor, starvation, deportations to death camps
- Perpetrators: Nazi SS, Orpo police battalions
- Camp: Bełżec extermination camp
- Victims: 20,000 Polish Jews

The Nowy Sącz Ghetto – known in German as Ghetto von Neu-Sandez and in Yiddish as צאנז (Tsanz; Zanc) or נײ-סאנץ (Nay-Sants; Nojzanc) – was a World War II ghetto set up by Nazi Germany for the purpose of persecution and exploitation of Polish Jews in the city of Nowy Sącz pronounced [ˈnɔvɨ ˈsɔnt͡ʂ] during the occupation of Poland (1939–45).

The relocation of Jews began when the German army rolled into Nowy Sącz on 6 September 1939 in the first week of the invasion of Poland. Synagogues and prayer houses were devastated and turned into storehouses. The ghetto was populated by 18,000 prisoners drawn from the city and from all neighbouring settlements. It was officially closed off from the outside in June 1941. It was liquidated one year later, with all Jewish men, women and children rounded up and sent aboard Holocaust trains to Bełżec extermination camp in late August 1942.

== Background ==
According to records, Jews had lived in Nowy Sącz since at least 1469. Over the centuries, Jews contributed greatly to the town's overall economy. Most Jewish families lived in the Zakamienica neighbourhood by the Kamienica river. The first brick-and-mortar synagogue was built at Nowy Sącz in 1699. Nowy Sącz was an influential centre of Hasidic Judaism and the Zionist movement dating back to the 19th century. Before the German and Soviet invasion of Poland in 1939, some 30 percent of Nowy Sącz's 34,000 residents were Jewish, with 90 percent of the city centre's tenement houses owned by Jews.

On 6 September 1939 the Germans took over Nowy Sącz and renamed it Neu-Sandez. The command of the city was given to Gestapo SS-Obersturmführer Heinrich Hamann (de) (pl). Nowy Sącz became the seat of Kreis Neu-Sandez in Distrikt Krakau of the General Government, in line with the Nazi-Soviet pact against Poland. The persecution of Jews began soon thereafter. The new German administration ordered all Jewish businesses closed pending confiscation proceedings. In the spring of 1940 the Judenrat was formed on German orders. The first mass execution of Jews and Poles took place in May 1940, in the course of the German AB-Aktion in Poland. The city block surrounding the German office of Sicherheitspolizei was cleared of all so-called "undesirables." Nearly 1,000 people were murdered.

== Ghetto history ==
Dispossessed Jews were resettled to Nowy Sącz in several major deportation actions from the neighbouring towns of Muszyna, Krynica (1,000–1,200), Piwniczna, but also from Łódź, Sieradz, Kraków, Lwów and Bielsko. Hamann proclaimed the ghetto's formation in June 1941, at which time a 2–3 metre wall was erected along its perimeter.

However, the ghetto zone already existed, having been established on 12 July 1940. This zone consisted of two interconnected areas of the city centre, both very small. The first zone was established around Kazimierza Wielkiego Street by the castle, and the second one was on the other side of the river, in the so-called Piekło neighbourhood across the Lwowska Street bridge. Some 12,000 Jews were forced to relocate to these zones.

In the following months, more Jews were resettled to Nowy Sącz from the General Government and territories of Poland annexed by Nazi Germany, forced by the SS to subsist on little to nothing in extremely overcrowded conditions. Often 20 people were assigned to one room. The ghetto was entirely dependent on the German authorities for food. Starvation rations were introduced. In the fall of 1941, some 30 Jews were caught and executed following a failed escape attempt across the border to the Soviet-occupied eastern part of Poland. The total number of Jews in the ghetto grew to 18,000.

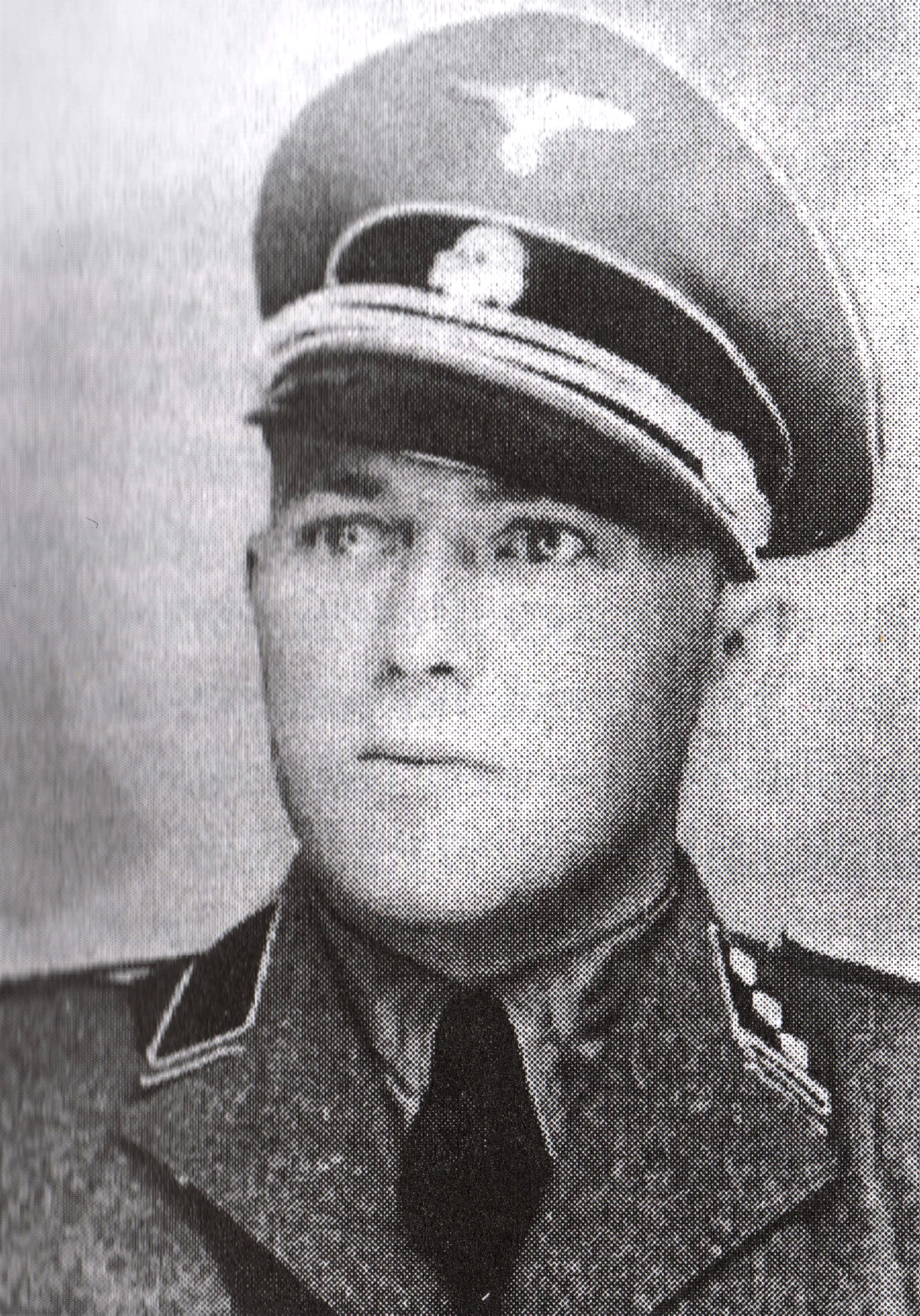
SS-Obersturmführer Heinrich Hamann in charge of ghetto liquidation

A number of forced labour camps were set up in the vicinity of Nowy Sącz for the able-bodied prisoners, including the camp in Rożnów (improperly, Różanów) as well as camps in Stary Sącz, Chełmiec, Rytro, and Lipie. Several hundred men were sent to Rabka. All Jewish slave labourers were housed at the Zakamienica ghetto located between the river bank and the streets of Zdrojowa (to the north), Hallera, Barska, and Lwowska (to the south). In total, 2,500 Jews were sent away. A system of gradually escalating terror was introduced with publicly announced executions. Within two days of each other, the Nazis staged two mass executions of Jews in the ghetto, about 200 men were murdered for alleged Zionist activities, and another 70 men were shot for alleged cigarette smuggling.

The German Operation Reinhard was the deadliest phase of the Holocaust. It began on 23 August 1942, with the final ghetto liquidation action taking place over a three-day period, under the guise of "resettlement in the East" (Umsiedlung). Prior to this, families with sick and elderly members were ordered to relocate to the ghetto at Kazimierza Wielkiego Street.

Many people were physically unable to immediately leave their homes. Most of these were shot at point-blank range by Ordnungspolizei during early morning roundups. The long column of Jewish prisoners gathered for deportation was led to an open field by the river, not far from the rail bridge across Dunajec. They were ordered to bring travel food, light luggage, and keys to their homes, because they would be transferred to labour camps in Reichskommissariat Ukraine. During a selection, approximately 750 young males were taken to be sent to slave labour camps in nearby Muszyna, Rożnów, and Sędziszów Małopolski. All other Jews – estimated to be at least 15,000 – were kept on the river bank overnight and taken in three Holocaust transports to the Bełżec death camp from 25–28 August 1942. The Neu-Sandez (Nowy Sącz) Ghetto was no more.

The commandant of the city and head of the Neu-Sandez SD, Gestapo SS-Obersturmführer Heinrich Hamann, killed dozens of Jews with his own hands during the period of the ghetto and during its murderous liquidation. Hamann went on to live a normal life in West Germany after World War II. He was arrested twenty years after the fact by the German authorities, and in 1962 put on trial at Bochum, along with 14 members of his department, for complicity in the murder of 17,000 Polish Jews from Neu-Sandez. Hamann was charged with 76 cases of murder based on witness testimony, and received a life sentence.

== Holocaust rescue ==
One of the most far-reaching rescue missions in Nowy Sącz was conducted by Anna Sokołowska née Hadziacka, a Catholic high school teacher who ran a safe house for Jewish students in her apartment at 10 Szujskiego Street. She procured false documents for them, bought food, clothing, medicine, harboured the sick, found Polish families for Jewish children, and delivered the ghetto correspondence. She was caught by the Gestapo with two Jewish women in her house and sent to Ravensbrück, where according to one account she was killed with a phenol injection. The Jewish survivors remembered her; they bestowed on Sokołowska the title of Righteous in 1989.

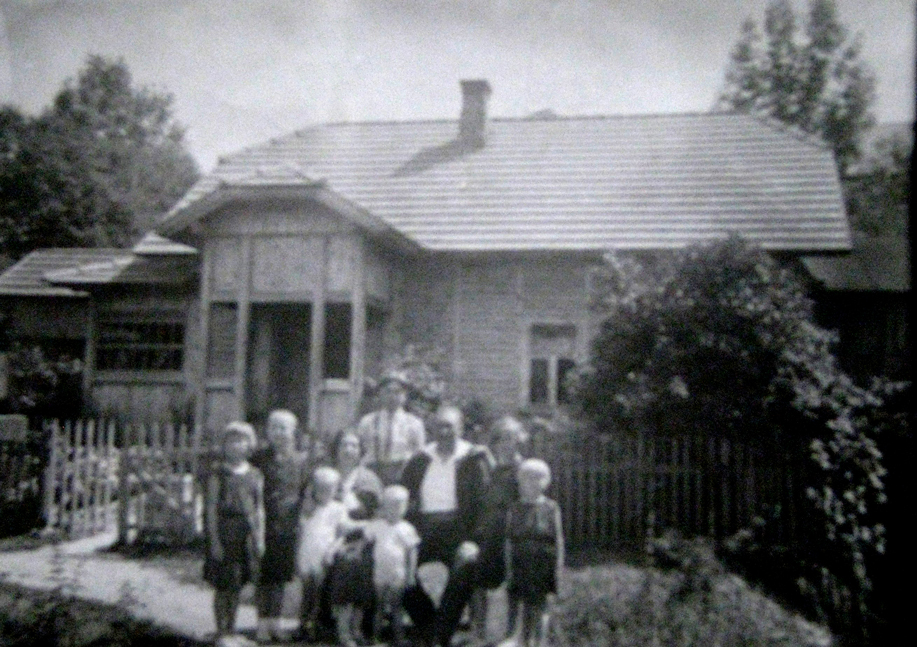
The Król family of the Polish Righteous from Krasne (c. 1937–39) in front of their house west of Nowy Sącz. Sitting: Piotr Król (died 1956) and Zenobia (died 1979), both recognized by Yad Vashem posthumously in 1982

One day ahead of the ghetto liquidation, the Jewish family of Emil and Sala Steinlauf with their four children – Lola, Leon, Róża (Rosa), and Janina – managed to escape. They knew the family of Zenobia and Piotr Król (pictured) and their seven children from before the war; the Steinlaufs helped the Króls survive the winter of 1939. In gratitude, Zenobia and Piotr illegally smuggled food to the ghetto, against strict Nazi orders that carried the death penalty. Upon the Steinlaufs' successful flight from the deportation to Belzec, the Króls arranged a secret living space for them and hid them in the attic for the next three years. While they were in hiding (14 August 1942–30 January 1945) their children used to play together. All survived. The Steinlaufs emigrated to Israel after the war ended, but both families remained in contact. Nine members of the Król family were awarded the titles of the Righteous in January 1982, thanks to the Steinlaufs' surviving children.

During the ghetto liquidation, Helena (Lena) and Genowefa Brandel-Buchbinder (two Jewish sisters, aged 23 and 29 respectively) escaped dressed as farm girls. Their brothers Kazimierz (age 24) and Władysław escaped from the slave labour camp in Chełmiec and joined them. They found refuge at the distant home of the Sikoń family of the Polish Righteous. Both the rescuers and the rescued had little to eat. The Sikoń children stole food from the neighbouring farms to feed them all. Genowefa died in March 1943 from tuberculosis. Everybody else survived the war. Zofia Sikoń died in 1971; the Sikoń children, Stanisław and Anna, were bestowed the titles of the Righteous in May 2000.

The Jewish doctor Juliusz Hellereich (Bernard Ingram) and his Polish fiancée Irena found shelter at the small Nowy Sącz apartment of Polish Righteous Marian Gołębiowski, a lawyer. In search of safe hideaways, Gołębiowski travelled with them under false identities (the Jakobiszyns) to other locations. All three stayed together until the end of the occupation and survived while helping others. Gołębiowski was honoured by Yad Vashem in 1989 at the age of 90. Stefan Kiełbasa, an 18 year old Jew from Nowy Sącz was shot along with one of his Christian friends in 1942 by the Gestapo for supplying Jews with forged "Aryan" identity documents. Stanisław Adamczyk from the county of Nowy Sącz was beaten to death by the Germans in the spring of 1943 for sheltering a single Jew. Another Christian Pole from Nowy Sącz county, physician Józef Pietrzykowski, was arrested and executed in winter of 1942 for providing medical help to a sick Jewish child.

== See also ==
- Jewish ghettos in German-occupied Poland
- The Holocaust in occupied Poland
- Nazi crimes against the Polish nation
