= Julianów, Gmina Błędów =

Julianów
- Village
- Location within Poland
- Coordinates: 51°45′56″N 20°39′57″E
- Country: Poland
- Voivodeship: Masovian
- County: Grójec
- Gmina: Błędów

Julianów [juˈljanuf] is a village in the administrative district of Gmina Błędów, within Grójec County, Masovian Voivodeship, in east-central Poland.
