= Cesinów-Las =

Village in Gmina Błędów, Poland

- Village
- Location within Poland
- Coordinates: 51°50′43″N 20°43′36″E
- Country: Poland
- Voivodeship: Masovian
- County: Grójec
- Gmina: Błędów

Cesinów-Las [t͡sɛˈɕinuf ˈlas] is a village in the administrative district of Gmina Błędów, within Grójec County, Masovian Voivodeship, in east-central Poland.
