= Przydonica-Glinik =

- Village
- Location within Poland
- Coordinates: 49°44′43″N 20°45′22″E
- Country: Poland
- Voivodeship: Lesser Poland
- County: Nowy Sącz
- Gmina: Gródek nad Dunajcem
- Population: 223

Przydonica-Glinik [pʂɨdɔˈɲit͡sa ˈɡlʲiɲik] is a village in the administrative district of Gmina Gródek nad Dunajcem, within Nowy Sącz County, Lesser Poland Voivodeship, in southern Poland.
