= Wilcze Średnie =

- Village
- Location within Poland
- Coordinates: 51°50′23″N 20°36′35″E
- Country: Poland
- Voivodeship: Masovian
- County: Grójec
- Gmina: Błędów

Wilcze Średnie [ˈvilt͡ʂɛ ˈɕrɛdɲɛ] is a village in the administrative district of Gmina Błędów, within Grójec County, Masovian Voivodeship, in east-central Poland.
