= Sienna, Lesser Poland Voivodeship =

Sienna
- Village
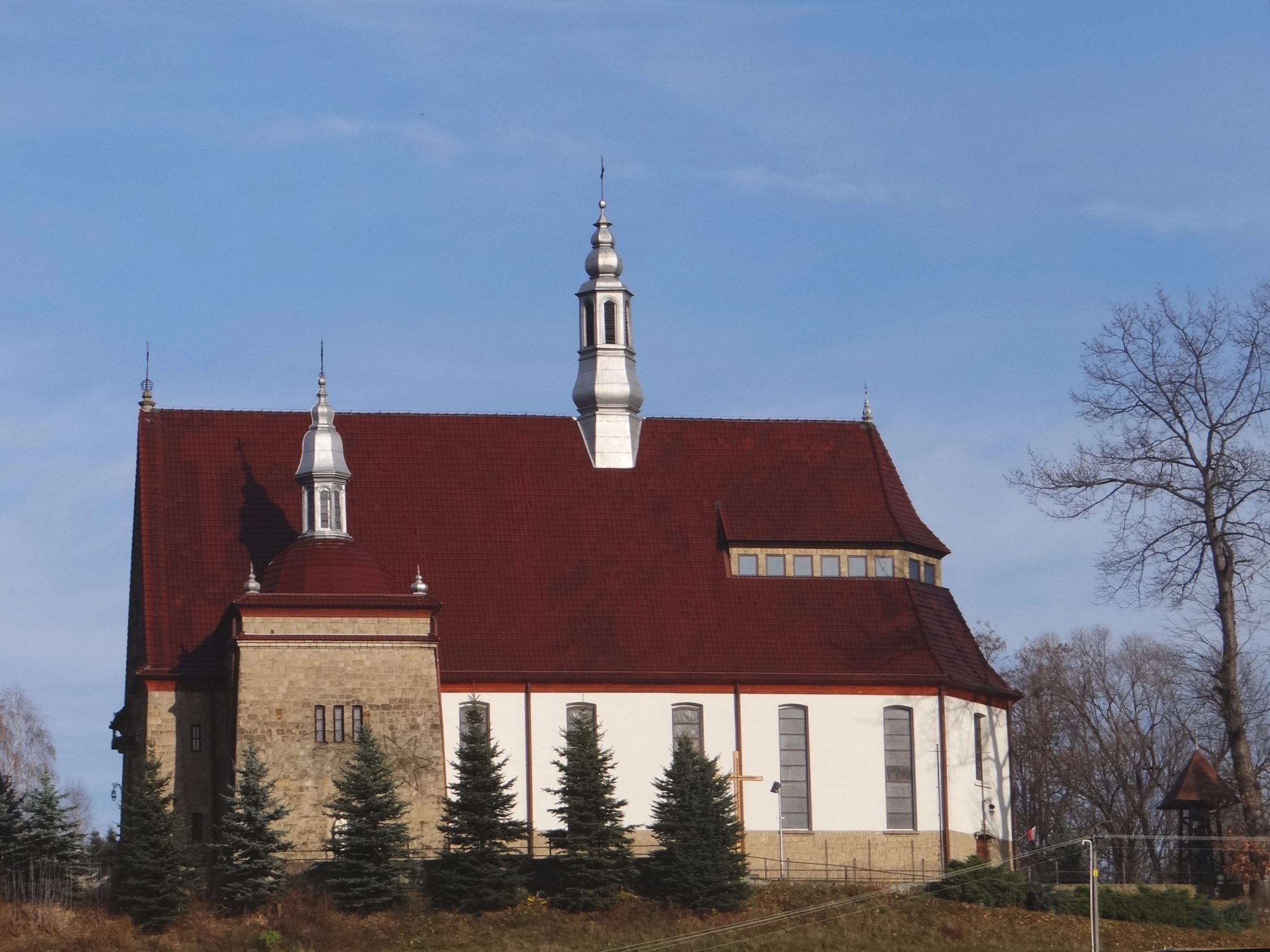
- Catholic church

- Location within Poland
- Coordinates: 49°42′50″N 20°41′45″E
- Country: Poland
- Voivodeship: Lesser Poland
- County: Nowy Sącz
- Gmina: Gródek nad Dunajcem

Sienna [ˈɕɛnːa] is a village in the administrative district of Gmina Gródek nad Dunajcem, within Nowy Sącz County, Lesser Poland Voivodeship, in southern Poland.
