= Trzylatków-Parcela =

- Village
- Location within Poland
- Coordinates: 51°48′53″N 20°41′52″E
- Country: Poland
- Voivodeship: Masovian
- County: Grójec
- Gmina: Błędów

Trzylatków-Parcela [tʂɨˈlatkuf parˈt͡sɛla] is a village in the administrative district of Gmina Błędów, within Grójec County, Masovian Voivodeship, in east-central Poland.
