= Czesławin =

- Village
- Location within Poland
- Coordinates: 51°49′30″N 20°37′31″E
- Country: Poland
- Voivodeship: Masovian
- County: Grójec
- Gmina: Błędów

Czesławin (Polish pronunciation: [t͡ʂɛˈswavin]) is a village in the administrative district of Gmina Błędów, within Grójec County, Masovian Voivodeship, in east-central Poland.
