= Śmiechówek =

- Village
- Location within Poland
- Coordinates: 51°46′52″N 20°38′58″E
- Country: Poland
- Voivodeship: Masovian
- County: Grójec
- Gmina: Błędów

Śmiechówek [ɕmjɛˈxuvɛk] is a village in the administrative district of Gmina Błędów, within Grójec County, Masovian Voivodeship, in east-central Poland.
