= Błędów, Grójec County =

Błędów
- Village
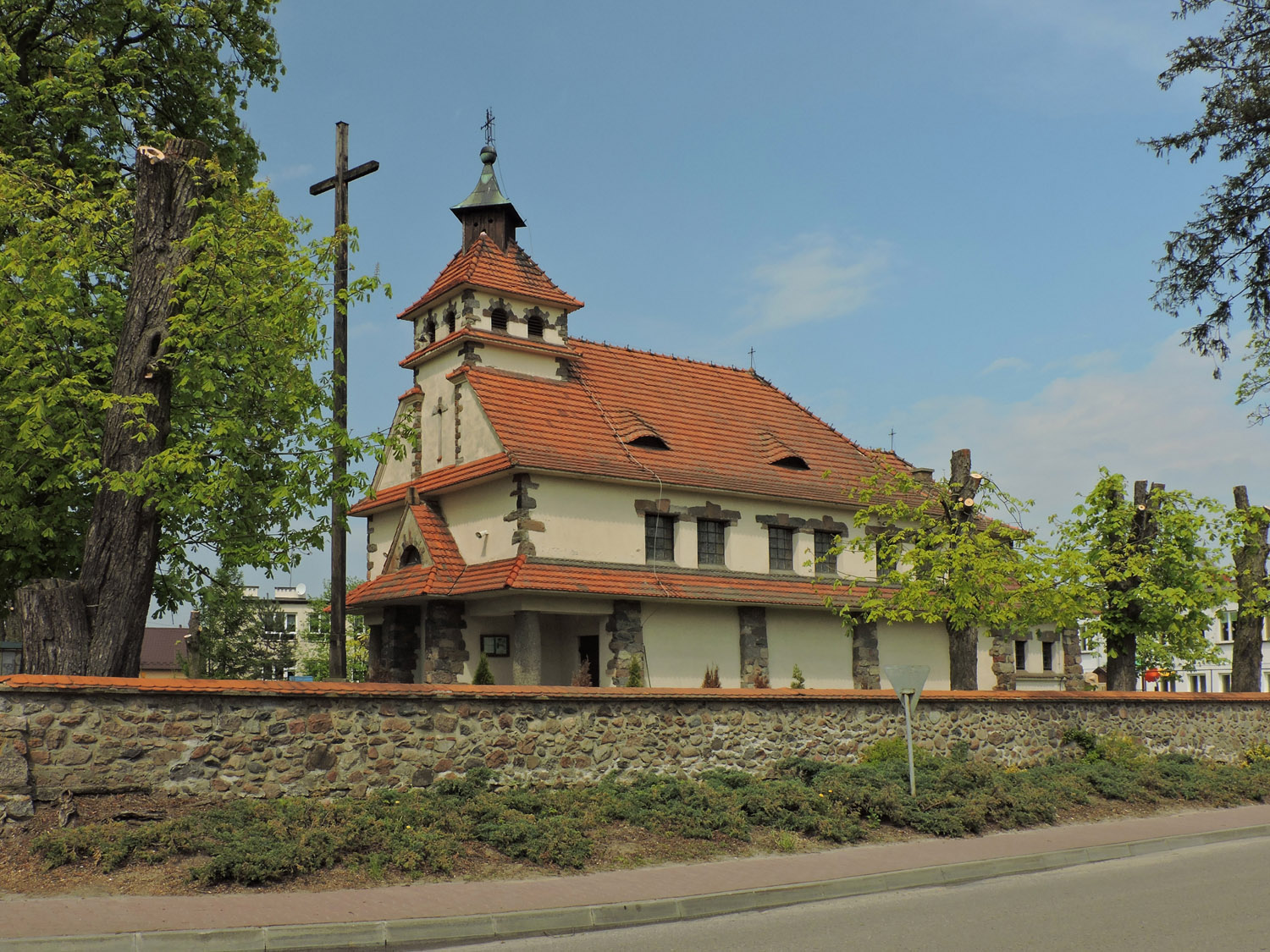
- Church of Saint Procopius

- Location within Poland
- Coordinates: 51°46′45″N 20°41′47″E
- Country: Poland
- Voivodeship: Masovian
- County: Grójec
- Gmina: Błędów

Population
  - Total: 1,100

Błędów [ˈbwɛnduf] is a village in Grójec County, Masovian Voivodeship, in east-central Poland. It is the seat of the gmina (administrative district) called Gmina Błędów.
