= Zbyszyce =

- Village
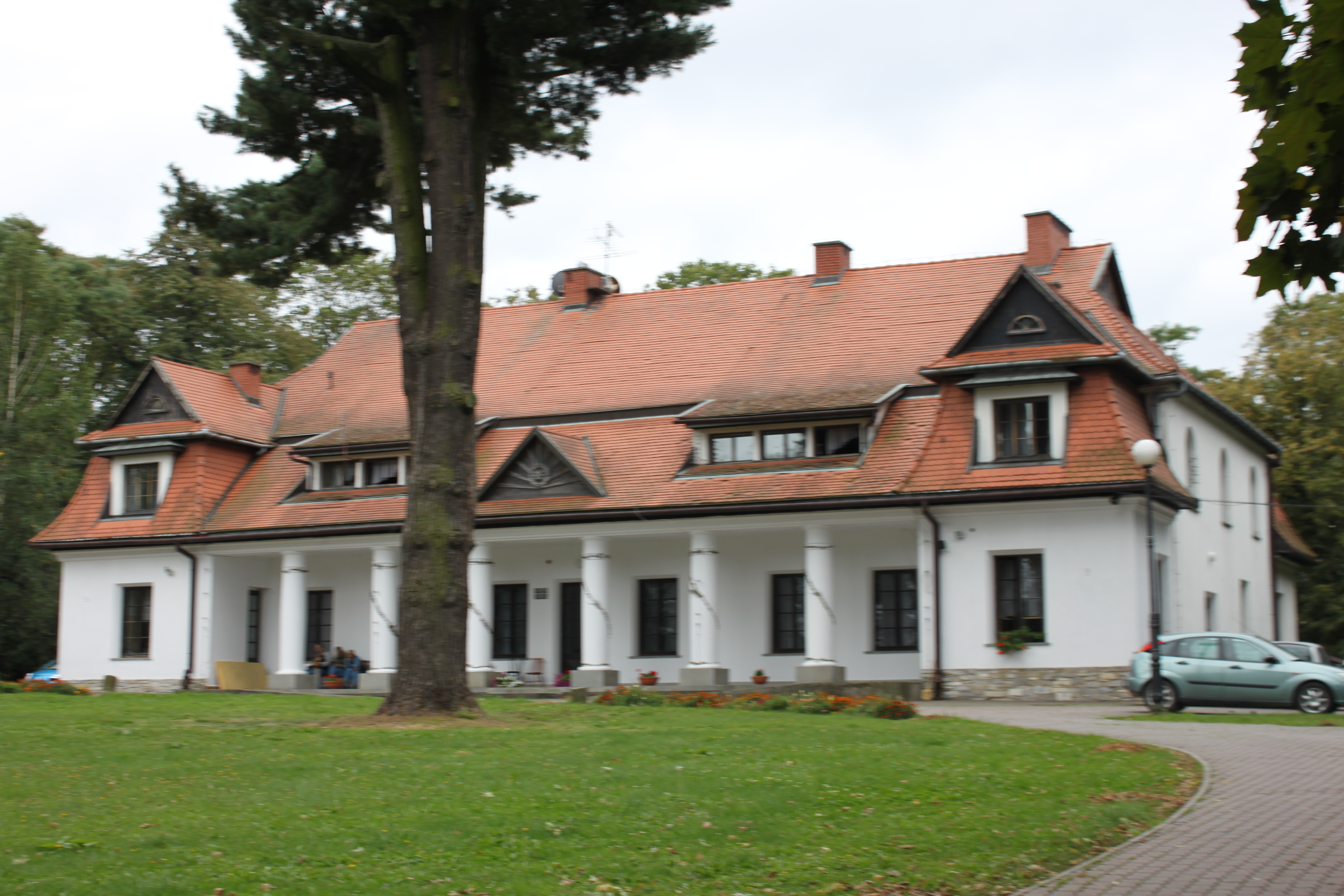
- Manor house

- Location within Poland
- Coordinates: 49°43′N 20°40′E
- Country: Poland
- Voivodeship: Lesser Poland
- County: Nowy Sącz
- Gmina: Gródek nad Dunajcem
- Population: 310

Zbyszyce [zbɨˈʂɨt͡sɛ] is a village in the administrative district of Gmina Gródek nad Dunajcem, within Nowy Sącz County, Lesser Poland Voivodeship, in southern Poland.
