= Oleśnik, Masovian Voivodeship =

Oleśnik
- Village
- Location within Poland
- Coordinates: 51°46′N 20°43′E
- Country: Poland
- Voivodeship: Masovian
- County: Grójec
- Gmina: Błędów

Oleśnik [ɔˈlɛɕnik] is a village in the administrative district of Gmina Błędów, within Grójec County, Masovian Voivodeship, in east-central Poland.
