= Kazimierz Ryczan =

Polish Roman Catholic bishop

- Bishop of Kielce
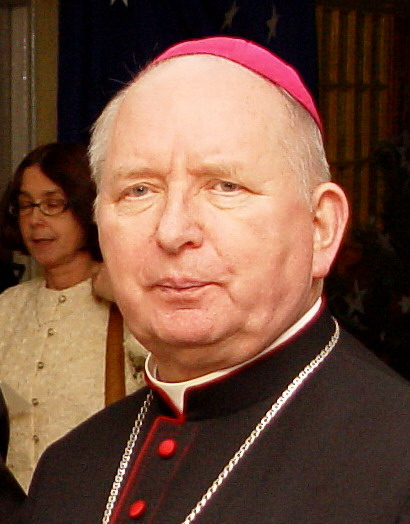
- Kazimierz Ryczan in 2007
- Church: Catholic Church
- Diocese: Diocese of Kielce
- In office: 17 July 1993 – 11 October 2014
- Predecessor: Stanisław Szymecki
- Successor: Jan Piotrowski

Orders
- Ordination: 16 June 1963 by Franciszek Barda
- Consecration: 11 September 1993 by Franciszek Macharski

Personal details
- Born: 10 February 1939 Żurawica, Przemyśl County, Lwów Voivodeship, Poland
- Died: 13 September 2017 (aged 78) Kielce, Świętokrzyskie Voivodeship, Poland

Kazimierz Ryczan (10 February 1939 – 13 September 2017) was a Polish Roman Catholic bishop.

Ordained to the priesthood on 16 June 1963, Ryczan was named bishop of the Roman Catholic Diocese of Kielce, Poland on 17 July 1993.

Pope Francis accepted his resignation on 11 October 2014.

He died on 13 December 2017.
