= Trzylatków Mały =

- Village
- Location within Poland
- Coordinates: 51°48′32″N 20°41′59″E
- Country: Poland
- Voivodeship: Masovian
- County: Grójec
- Gmina: Błędów
- Population: 80

Trzylatków Mały [tʂɨˈlatkuf ˈmawɨ] is a village in the administrative district of Gmina Błędów, within Grójec County, Masovian Voivodeship, in east-central Poland.
