= Dańków, Masovian Voivodeship =

Village in Gmina Błędów, Poland

Dańków
- Village
- Location within Poland
- Coordinates: 51°43′59″N 20°41′36″E
- Country: Poland
- Voivodeship: Masovian
- County: Grójec
- Gmina: Błędów

Dańków [ˈdaɲkuf] is a village in the administrative district of Gmina Błędów, within Grójec County, Masovian Voivodeship, in east-central Poland.
