= Golianki =

Village in Gmina Błędów

- Village
- Location within Poland
- Coordinates: 51°47′N 20°43′E
- Country: Poland
- Voivodeship: Masovian
- County: Grójec
- Gmina: Błędów
- Area: 1.54 km^{2} (0.59 sq mi)
- Population (2011): 96
  - Density: 62/km^{2} (160/sq mi)

Golianki [ɡɔˈljanki] is a village in the administrative district of Gmina Błędów, within Grójec County, Masovian Voivodeship, in east-central Poland. As of 2011, its population is 96, with 50 males and 46 females.
