= Wilkonice, Masovian Voivodeship =

Wilkonice
- Village
- Location within Poland
- Coordinates: 51°49′45″N 20°39′52″E
- Country: Poland
- Voivodeship: Masovian
- County: Grójec
- Gmina: Błędów

Wilkonice [vilkɔˈnit͡sɛ] is a village in the administrative district of Gmina Błędów, within Grójec County, Masovian Voivodeship, in east-central Poland.
