= Kacperówka =

Village in Gmina Błędów

- Village
- Location within Poland
- Coordinates: 51°49′40″N 20°39′13″E
- Country: Poland
- Voivodeship: Masovian
- County: Grójec
- Gmina: Błędów

Kacperówka [kat͡spɛˈrufka] is a village in the administrative district of Gmina Błędów, within Grójec County, Masovian Voivodeship, in east-central Poland.
