= Bartkowa =

- Village
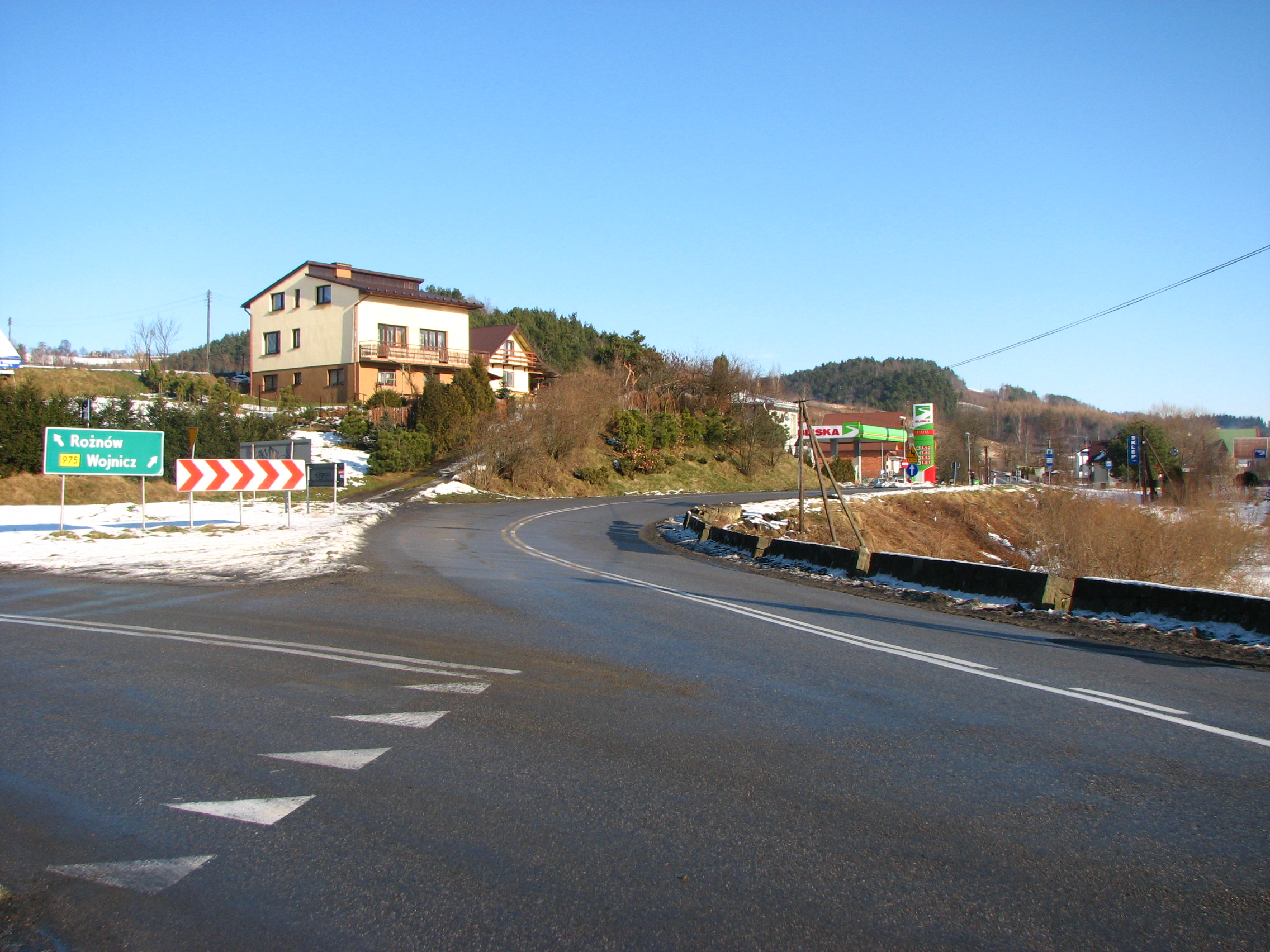

- Location within Poland
- Coordinates: 49°46′N 20°45′E
- Country: Poland
- Voivodeship: Lesser Poland
- County: Nowy Sącz
- Gmina: Gródek nad Dunajcem
- Population: 1,143

Bartkowa [bartˈkɔva] is a village in the administrative district of Gmina Gródek nad Dunajcem, within Nowy Sącz County, Lesser Poland Voivodeship, in southern Poland.
