= Jelna-Działy =

- Village
- Location within Poland
- Coordinates: 49°42′02″N 20°43′26″E
- Country: Poland
- Voivodeship: Lesser Poland
- County: Nowy Sącz
- Gmina: Gródek nad Dunajcem
- Population: 181

Jelna-Działy [ˈjɛlna ˈd͡ʑawɨ] is a village in the administrative district of Gmina Gródek nad Dunajcem, within Nowy Sącz County, Lesser Poland Voivodeship, in southern Poland.
