= Goliany =

- Village
- Location within Poland
- Coordinates: 51°49′N 20°46′E
- Country: Poland
- Voivodeship: Masovian
- County: Grójec
- Gmina: Błędów
- Population: 120

Goliany [ɡɔˈljanɨ] is a village in the administrative district of Gmina Błędów, within Grójec County, Masovian Voivodeship, in east-central Poland.
