= Błędów Nowy =

- Village
- Location within Poland
- Coordinates: 51°45′58″N 20°41′3″E
- Country: Poland
- Voivodeship: Masovian
- County: Grójec
- Gmina: Błędów
- Population: 80

Błędów Nowy [ˈbwɛnduf ˈnɔvɨ] is a village in the administrative district of Gmina Błędów, within Grójec County, Masovian Voivodeship, in east-central Poland.
