= Bronisławów, Gmina Błędów =

Bronisławów
- Village
- Location within Poland
- Coordinates: 51°50′35″N 20°38′40″E
- Country: Poland
- Voivodeship: Masovian
- County: Grójec
- Gmina: Błędów

Bronisławów [brɔniˈswavuf] is a village in the administrative district of Gmina Błędów, within Grójec County, Masovian Voivodeship, in east-central Poland.
