= Ziemięcin, Masovian Voivodeship =

Ziemięcin
- Village
- Location within Poland
- Coordinates: 51°50′N 20°41′E
- Country: Poland
- Voivodeship: Masovian
- County: Grójec
- Gmina: Błędów

Ziemięcin [ʑɛˈmjɛnt͡ɕin] is a village in the administrative district of Gmina Błędów, within Grójec County, Masovian Voivodeship, in east-central Poland.
