= Katarzynów, Grójec County =

Katarzynów
- Village
- Location within Poland
- Coordinates: 51°45′N 20°37′E
- Country: Poland
- Voivodeship: Masovian
- County: Grójec
- Gmina: Błędów

Katarzynów [kataˈʐɨnuf] is a village in the administrative district of Gmina Błędów, within Grójec County, Masovian Voivodeship, in east-central Poland.
