= Annopol, Grójec County =

Village in Gmina Błędów, Poland

Annopol
- Village
- Location within Poland
- Coordinates: 51°49′1″N 20°34′20″E
- Country: Poland
- Voivodeship: Masovian
- County: Grójec
- Gmina: Błędów

Annopol [anˈnɔpɔl] is a village in the administrative district of Gmina Błędów, within Grójec County, Masovian Voivodeship, in east-central Poland.
