= Zofiówka, Grójec County =

Zofiówka
- Village
- Location within Poland
- Coordinates: 51°45′26″N 20°41′33″E
- Country: Poland
- Voivodeship: Masovian
- County: Grójec
- Gmina: Błędów

Zofiówka [zɔˈfjufka] is a village in the administrative district of Gmina Błędów, within Grójec County, Masovian Voivodeship, in east-central Poland.
