= Wilków Drugi =

- Village
- Location within Poland
- Coordinates: 51°47′55″N 20°37′18″E
- Country: Poland
- Voivodeship: Masovian
- County: Grójec
- Gmina: Błędów
- Population: 510

Wilków Drugi [ˈvilkuf ˈdruɡi] is a village in the administrative district of Gmina Błędów, within Grójec County, Masovian Voivodeship, in east-central Poland.
