= Jelna, Lesser Poland Voivodeship =

Jelna
- Village
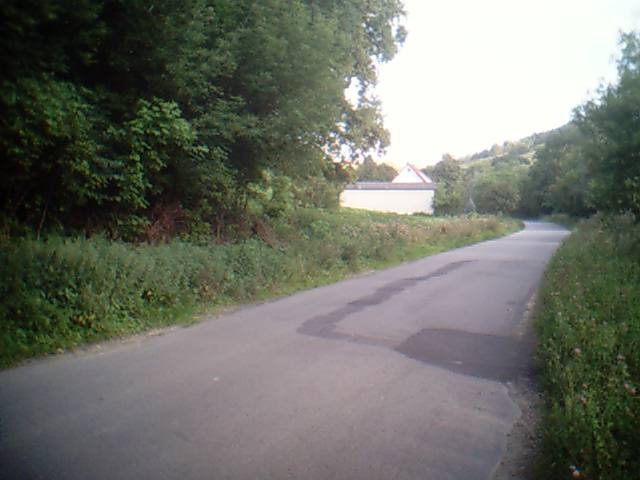

- Location within Poland
- Coordinates: 49°42′11″N 20°43′25″E
- Country: Poland
- Voivodeship: Lesser Poland
- County: Nowy Sącz
- Gmina: Gródek nad Dunajcem

Jelna [ˈjɛlna] is a village in the administrative district of Gmina Gródek nad Dunajcem, within Nowy Sącz County, Lesser Poland Voivodeship, in southern Poland.
