= Machnatka-Parcela =

- Village
- Location within Poland
- Coordinates: 51°50′58″N 20°40′16″E
- Country: Poland
- Voivodeship: Masovian
- County: Grójec
- Gmina: Błędów
- Elevation: 176 m (577 ft)
- Population: 260

Machnatka-Parcela [maxˈnatka parˈt͡sɛla] is a village in the administrative district of Gmina Błędów, within Grójec County, Masovian Voivodeship, in east-central Poland.
