= Tomczyce, Gmina Błędów =

Tomczyce
- Village
- Location within Poland
- Coordinates: 51°47′07″N 20°39′57″E
- Country: Poland
- Voivodeship: Masovian
- County: Grójec
- Gmina: Błędów

Tomczyce [tɔmˈt͡ʂɨt͡sɛ] is a village in the administrative district of Gmina Błędów, within Grójec County, Masovian Voivodeship, in east-central Poland.
