= Podole-Górowa =

- Village
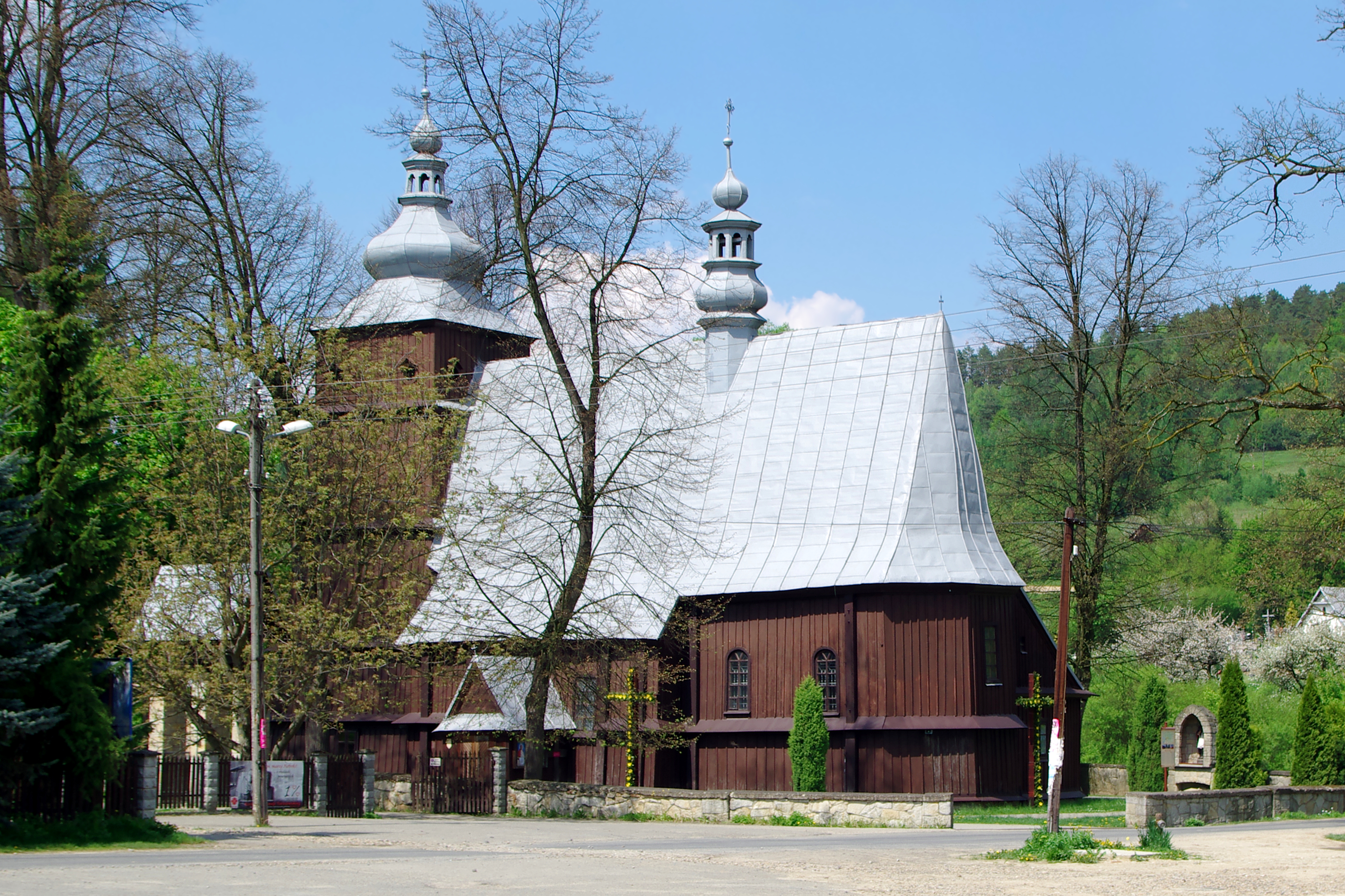
- Exaltation of the Holy Cross church

- Location within Poland
- Coordinates: 49°45′N 20°47′E
- Country: Poland
- Voivodeship: Lesser Poland
- County: Nowy Sącz
- Gmina: Gródek nad Dunajcem

Podole-Górowa [pɔˈdɔlɛ ˈɡurɔva] is a village in the administrative district of Gmina Gródek nad Dunajcem, within Nowy Sącz County, Lesser Poland Voivodeship, in southern Poland.

The village was created by adjoining two villages, Podole and Górowa, in 2009.
