= Pelinów, Grójec County =

Village in Gmina Błędów, Poland

Pelinów
- Village
- Location within Poland
- Coordinates: 51°44′24″N 20°39′23″E
- Country: Poland
- Voivodeship: Masovian
- County: Grójec
- Gmina: Błędów

Pelinów [pɛˈlinuf] is a village in the administrative district of Gmina Błędów, within Grójec County, Masovian Voivodeship, in east-central Poland.
