= Dąbrówka Nowa, Masovian Voivodeship =

Dąbrówka Nowa
- Village
- Location within Poland
- Coordinates: 51°48′N 20°44′E
- Country: Poland
- Voivodeship: Masovian
- County: Grójec
- Gmina: Błędów

Dąbrówka Nowa [dɔmˈbrufka ˈnɔva] is a village in the administrative district of Gmina Błędów, within Grójec County, Masovian Voivodeship, in east-central Poland.
