= Zalesie, Gmina Błędów =

Zalesie
- Village
- Location within Poland
- Coordinates: 51°50′0″N 20°38′26″E
- Country: Poland
- Voivodeship: Masovian
- County: Grójec
- Gmina: Błędów
- Elevation: 183 m (600 ft)
- Postal code: 05-620

Zalesie [zaˈlɛɕɛ] is a village in the administrative district of Gmina Błędów, within Grójec County, Masovian Voivodeship, in east-central Poland.
