= Gmina Błędów =

Gmina Błędów Błędów Commune
- Gmina
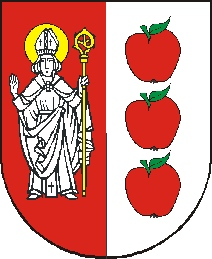
- Coat of arms
- Interactive map of Gmina Błędów
- Coordinates (Błędów): 51°46′45″N 20°41′47″E
- Country: Poland
- Voivodeship: Masovian
- County: Grójec
- Seat: Błędów

Area
  - Total: 135.23 km^{2} (52.21 sq mi)

Population (2006)
  - Total: 7,905
  - Density: 58.46/km^{2} (151.4/sq mi)
- Website: http://www.bledow.pl

Gmina Błędów is a rural gmina (administrative district) in Grójec County, Masovian Voivodeship, in east-central Poland. Its seat is the village of Błędów, which lies approximately 16 kilometres (10 mi) south-west of Grójec and 53 km (33 mi) south-west of Warsaw.

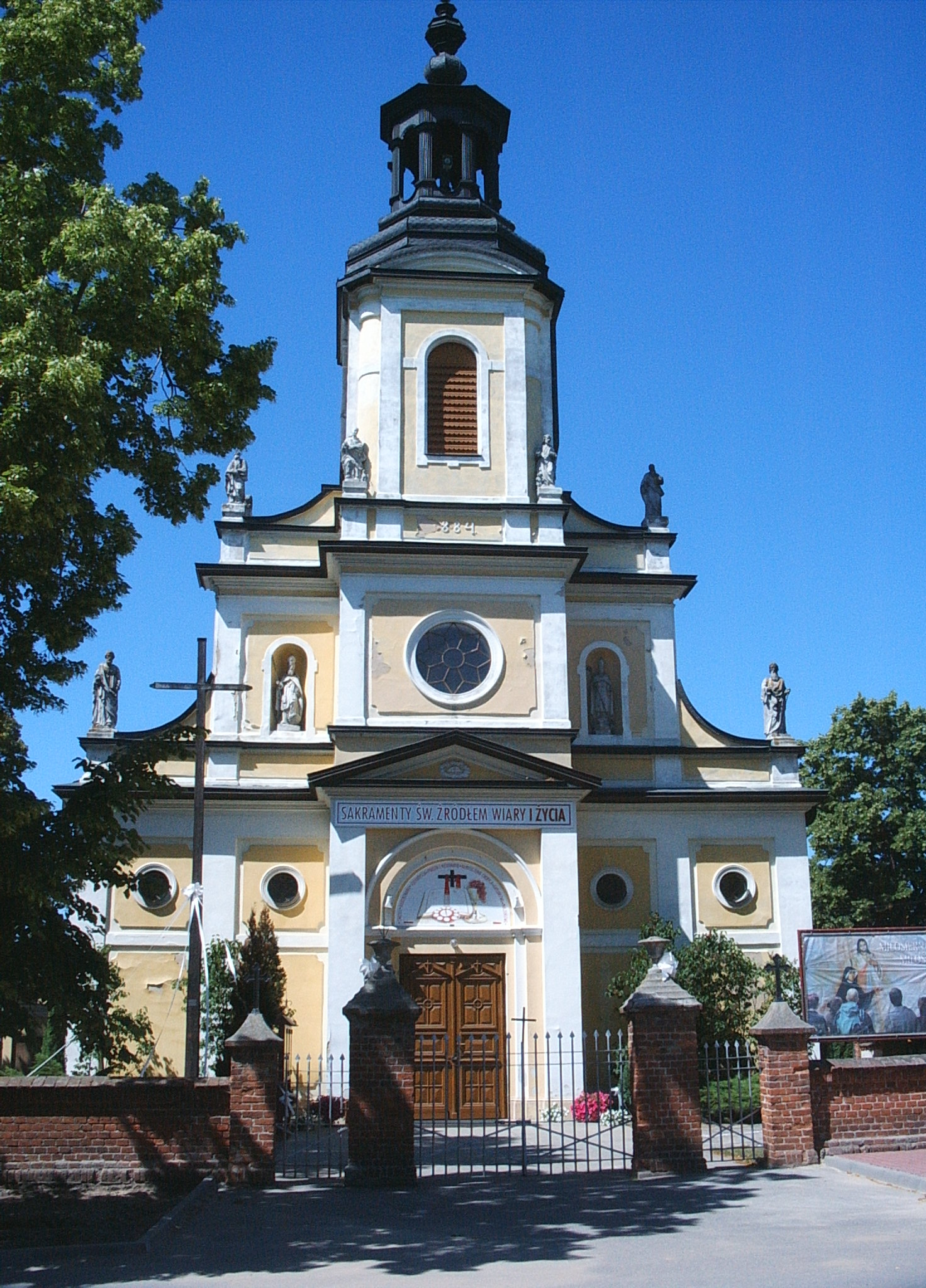

The gmina covers an area of 135.23 square kilometres (52.2 sq mi), and as of 2023 its total population is 7,067.

== Villages ==
Gmina Błędów contains the villages and settlements of Annopol, Bielany, Błędów, Błędów Nowy, Błogosław, Bolesławiec Leśny, Borzęcin, Bronisławów, Cesinów-Las, Czesławin, Dąbrówka Nowa, Dąbrówka Stara, Dańków, Fabianów, Głudna, Golianki, Goliany, Gołosze, Huta Błędowska, Ignaców, Jadwigów, Jakubów, Janki, Julianów, Kacperówka, Katarzynów, Kazimierki, Łaszczyn, Lipie, Machnatka, Machnatka-Parcela, Oleśnik, Pelinów, Potencjonów, Roztworów, Sadurki, Śmiechówek, Tomczyce, Trzylatków Duży, Trzylatków Mały, Trzylatków-Parcela, Wilcze Średnie, Wilhelmów, Wilkonice, Wilków Drugi, Wilków Pierwszy, Wólka Dańkowska, Wólka Gołoska, Wólka Kurdybanowska, Zalesie, Załuski, Ziemięcin and Zofiówka.

== Neighbouring gminas ==
Gmina Błędów is bordered by the gminas of Belsk Duży, Biała Rawska, Mogielnica, Mszczonów, Pniewy and Sadkowice.
