= Ignaców, Gmina Błędów =

Ignaców
- Village
- Location within Poland
- Coordinates: 51°45′33″N 20°38′45″E
- Country: Poland
- Voivodeship: Masovian
- County: Grójec
- Gmina: Błędów
- Time zone: UTC+1 (CET)
  - Summer (DST): UTC+2 (CEST)

Ignaców [iɡˈnat͡suf] is a village in the administrative district of Gmina Błędów, within Grójec County, Masovian Voivodeship, in east-central Poland.

Six Polish citizens were murdered by Nazi Germany in the village during World War II.
