= Przydonica =

- Village
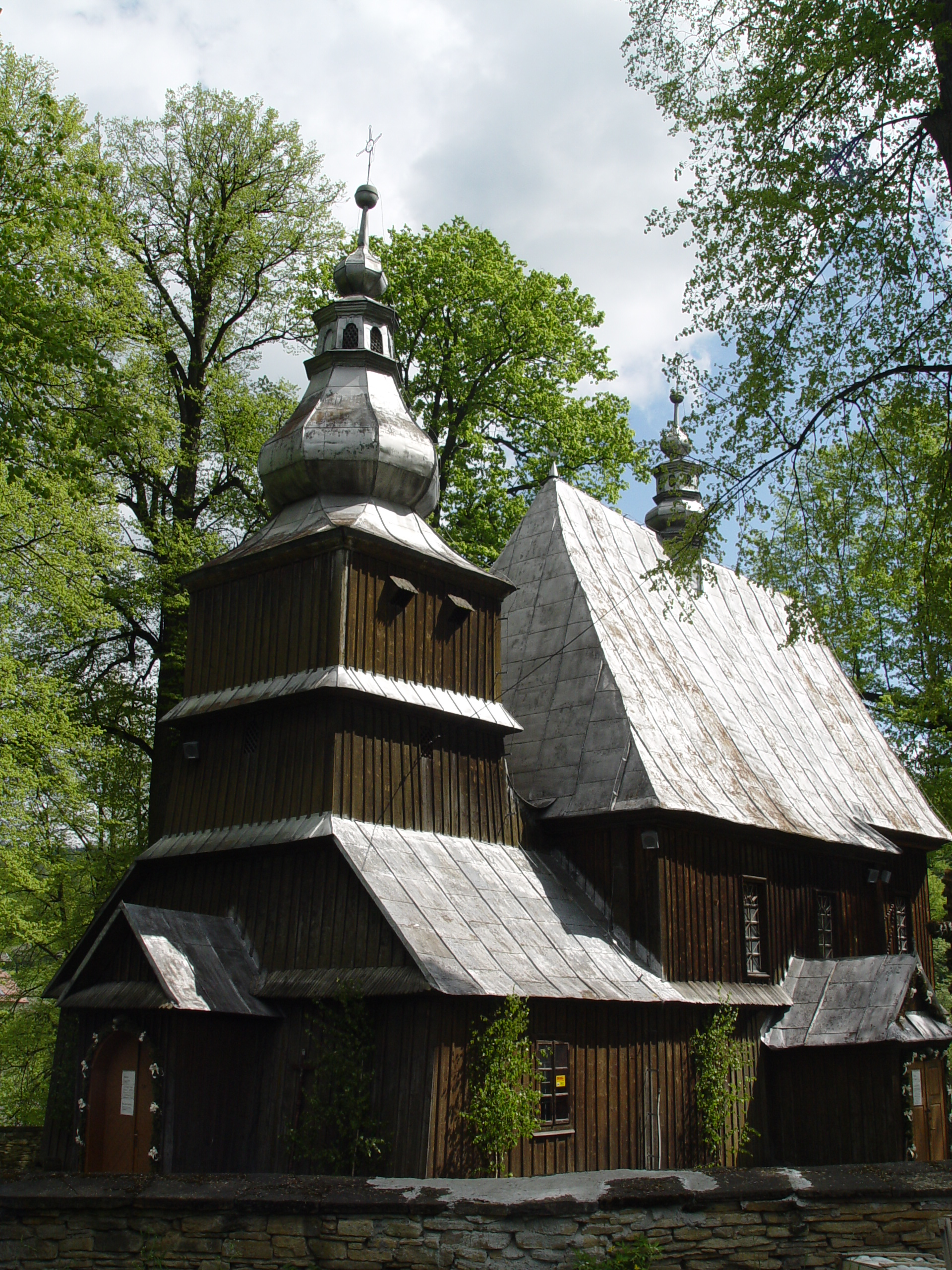
- Our Lady of Consolation’s parish church in Przydonica

- Location within Poland
- Coordinates: 49°44′N 20°47′E
- Country: Poland
- Voivodeship: Lesser Poland
- County: Nowy Sącz
- Gmina: Gródek nad Dunajcem

Population
  - Total: 1,384

Przydonica [pʂɨdɔˈɲit͡sa] is a village in the administrative district of Gmina Gródek nad Dunajcem, within Nowy Sącz County, Lesser Poland Voivodeship, in southern Poland.

== Church ==
The parish church dates back to the sixteenth century, and houses Our Lady of Przydonica, one of three such. King John III Sobieski proclaimed a miracle when he saw a vision of the Virgin Mary after a 1683 military victory in Vienna against the Turks.

== Commerce ==
The village hosts a sawmill and a general merchandise market
