= Gródek nad Dunajcem =

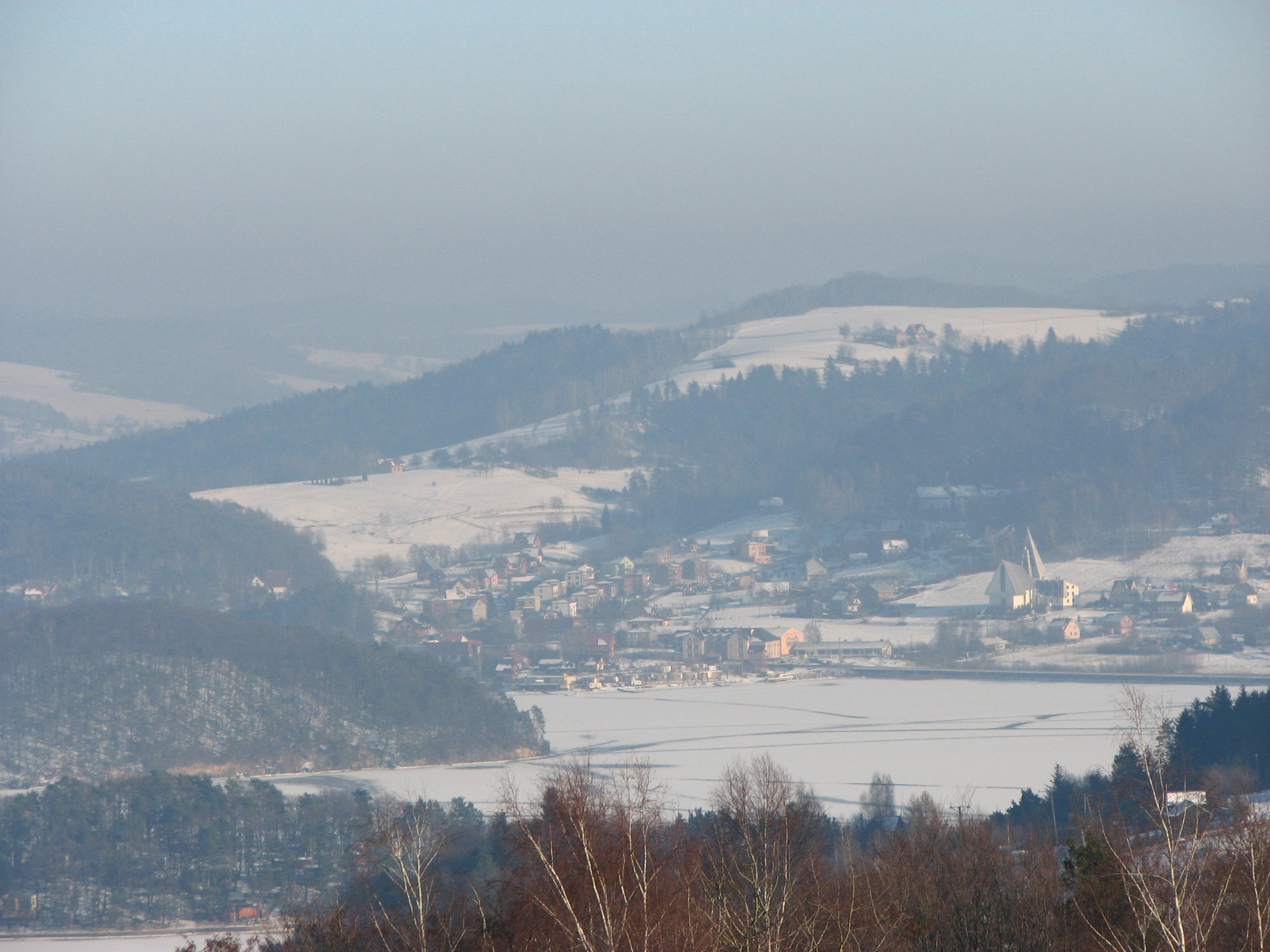
- Rożnowskie Lake and Gródek village. View from the west.

- Location within Poland
- Coordinates: 49°44′36″N 20°44′04″E
- Country: Poland
- Voivodeship: Lesser Poland
- County: Nowy Sącz
- Gmina: Gródek nad Dunajcem

Area
  - Total: 4 km^{2} (1.5 sq mi)

Population (2006)
  - Total: 900
  - Density: 230/km^{2} (580/sq mi)
- Time zone: UTC+1 (CET)
  - Summer (DST): UTC+2 (CEST)
- Postal code: 33-318
- Area code: +48 18
- Car plates: KNS

Gródek nad Dunajcem [ˈɡrudɛk nat duˈnajt͡sɛm] ("Little Town on the Dunajec") is a village in southern Poland situated in the Lesser Poland Voivodeship.

== See also ==
- Dunajec River
- Nowy Targ
- Zakopane
