= Machnatka =

- Village
- Location within Poland
- Coordinates: 51°50′26″N 20°40′51″E
- Country: Poland
- Voivodeship: Masovian
- County: Grójec
- Gmina: Błędów
- Elevation: 175 m (574 ft)
- Population: 140

Machnatka [maxˈnatka] is a village in the administrative district of Gmina Błędów, within Grójec County, Masovian Voivodeship, in east-central Poland.
