= Janki =

Janki may refer to the following places:

- Janki means goddess Sita in India (also known as Janaki)
- Janki, Gmina Horodło in Lublin Voivodeship (east Poland)
- Janki, Gmina Hrubieszów in Lublin Voivodeship (east Poland)
- Janki, Podlaskie Voivodeship (north-east Poland)
- Janki, Łódź Voivodeship (central Poland)
- Janki, Gostynin County in Masovian Voivodeship (east-central Poland)
- Janki, Grójec County in Masovian Voivodeship (east-central Poland)
- Janki, Pruszków County in Masovian Voivodeship (east-central Poland)
- Janki, Radom County in Masovian Voivodeship (east-central Poland)
- Janki, Wyszków County in Masovian Voivodeship (east-central Poland)

== See also ==
- Janki Młode, Ostrołęka County in Masovian Voivodeship (east-central Poland)
- Janki, Warmian-Masurian Voivodeship (north Poland)
