= Sadurki, Masovian Voivodeship =

Sadurki
- Village
- Location within Poland
- Coordinates: 51°16′24″N 22°16′22″E
- Country: Poland
- Voivodeship: Masovian
- County: Grójec
- Gmina: Błędów

Sadurki [saˈdurki] is a village in the administrative district of Gmina Błędów, within Grójec County, Masovian Voivodeship, in east-central Poland.
