= Bolesławiec Leśny =

Village in Gmina Błędów, Poland

- Village
- Location within Poland
- Coordinates: 51°47′18″N 20°35′24″E
- Country: Poland
- Voivodeship: Masovian
- County: Grójec
- Gmina: Błędów

Bolesławiec Leśny [bɔlɛˈswavjɛt͡s ˈlɛɕnɨ] is a village in the administrative district of Gmina Błędów, within Grójec County, Masovian Voivodeship, in east-central Poland.
