= Załuski, Grójec County =

Załuski
- Village
- Location within Poland
- Coordinates: 51°47′N 20°38′E
- Country: Poland
- Voivodeship: Masovian
- County: Grójec
- Gmina: Błędów
- Population: 180

Załuski [zaˈwuski] is a village in the administrative district of Gmina Błędów in Grójec County, Masovian Voivodeship, in east-central Poland. It is approximately 19 km (12 mi) southwest of Grójec and 55 km (34 mi) southwest of Warsaw. Its population is 180.
