= Lipie, Masovian Voivodeship =

Lipie
- Village
- Location within Poland
- Coordinates: 51°49′27″N 20°42′21″E
- Country: Poland
- Voivodeship: Masovian
- County: Grójec
- Gmina: Błędów
- Elevation: 173 m (568 ft)

Lipie [ˈlipjɛ] is a village in the administrative district of Gmina Błędów, within Grójec County, Masovian Voivodeship, in east-central Poland.
