= Lipie (bread) =

Traditional Romanian bread

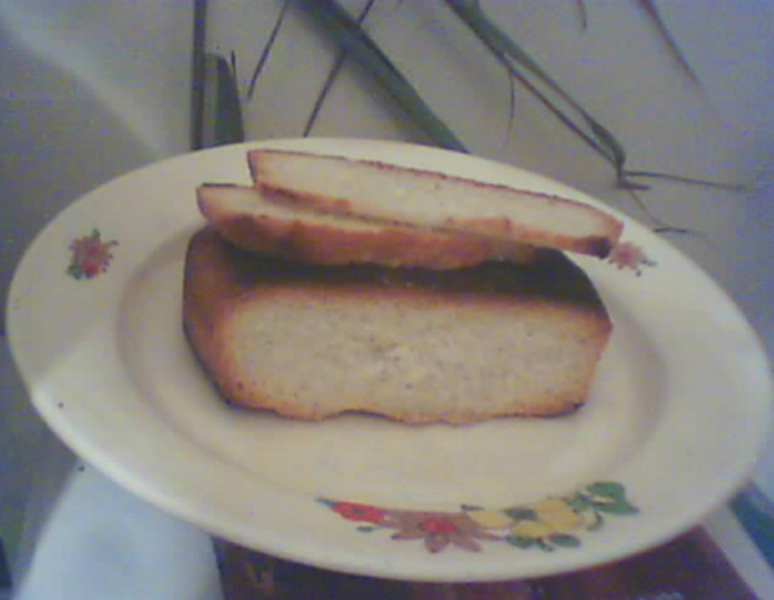
- Type: Bread
- Place of origin: Romania
- Main ingredients: Wheat flour

Lipie is a kind of bread from traditional Romanian cuisine. It is a round bread made with different wheat flour.

The lipie has been known since the 16th century. It can be seen on some Romanian tapestries and in religious art. A lipie from the 17th century was discovered in a house in the medieval village of Dolhești, and it was named Dolhești's bread.
