= Gmina Gródek nad Dunajcem =

Gmina Gródek nad Dunajcem Gródek nad Dunajcem Commune
- Gmina
- Interactive map of Gmina Gródek nad Dunajcem
- Coordinates (Gródek nad Dunajcem): 49°44′N 20°43′E
- Country: Poland
- Voivodeship: Lesser Poland
- County: Nowy Sącz County
- Seat: Gródek nad Dunajcem

Area
  - Total: 88.17 km^{2} (34.04 sq mi)

Population (2006)
  - Total: 8,896
  - Density: 100.9/km^{2} (261.3/sq mi)
- Website: http://www.grodek.sacz.pl

Gmina Gródek nad Dunajcem is a rural gmina (rural commune-administrative unit) in Nowy Sącz County, Lesser Poland Voivodeship, in southern Poland. Its seat is the village of Gródek nad Dunajcem, which lies approximately 13 kilometres (8 mi) north of Nowy Sącz and 67 km (42 mi) south-east of the regional capital Kraków.

The gmina covers an area of 88.17 square kilometres (34.0 sq mi), and as of 2006 its total population is 8,896.

The gmina contains part of the protected area called Ciężkowice-Rożnów Landscape Park.

== Villages ==
Gmina Gródek nad Dunajcem contains the villages and settlements of Bartkowa, Bujne, Gródek nad Dunajcem, Jelna, Jelna-Działy, Lipie, Podole-Górowa, Przydonica, Przydonica-Glinik, Rożnów, Roztoka, Sienna, Tropie and Zbyszyce.

== Neighbouring gminas ==
Gmina Gródek nad Dunajcem is bordered by the gminas of Chełmiec, Czchów, Korzenna, Łososina Dolna and Zakliczyn.
