= Ryszard Janecki =

Polish footballer

Personal information
- Full name: Ryszard Janecki
- Date of birth: 24 November 1919
- Place of birth: Chorzów, Poland
- Date of death: 8 January 2004 (aged 84)
- Place of death: Brzeg Dolny, Poland
- Height: 1.68 m (5 ft 6 in)
- Position: Forward

Youth career
- 1930–1938: AKS Chorzów

Senior career*
Years	Team	Apps	(Gls)
1938–1939	Lechia Tomaszów Mazowiecki		
1939	FV Germania Königshütte		
1945–1946	Fiorentina		
1946–1947	AC Legnano	18	(3)
1947–1948	AKS Chorzów	2	(0)
1949–1950	Lechia Gdańsk	5	(4)
1951–1958	Rokita Brzeg		

Managerial career
- 1954–1958: Rokita Brzeg
- 1958–1964: PKS Wołów
- * Club domestic league appearances and goals

Ryszard Janecki (24 November 1919 – 8 January 2004) was a former Polish footballer and football manager. In 1945, Janecki became the first Polish footballer to play in the Italian leagues.

== Biography ==
Janecki started playing football with his local team AKS Chorzów. He progressed through the youth sides, eventually moving to Lechia Tomaszów Mazowiecki to play first team football. In 1939, with the outbreak of World War Two, football in Poland was ceased, and Polish footballing clubs were closed down. Janecki's first team, AKS Chorzów, became known as Germania Königshütte to sound more German for the cities occupiers. Janecki featured for Germania in 1939 before the club itself was closed down and Janecki was drafted into the Wehrmacht. At some point during the war Janecki was captured and taken to a POW camp in England. He would go on to join the Polish Army Corps that was serving in Italy. After the war he chose to stay in Italy and started playing in the Italian leagues, initially playing with Fiorentina and spending a season with the club. After this first season he and fellow Polish player, Wincenty Franiel, signed contracts with AC Legnano. Over the course of the season with Legrano, he made 18 appearances and scored 3 goals in Italy's second division. At the first opportunity both players returned to Poland, with Janecki returning to his boyhood club AKS. Janecki only made 2 appearances with AKS, however both were in the league playoffs to decide the Polish champions. Janecki was not able to positively contribute in the playoffs, with AKS losing all 4 games, but finishing in third place overall in the Polish championships. After his return to AKS, Janecki moved to Lechia Gdańsk, where he went on to make 5 appearances in the league, and scoring 4 league goals in the process. Janecki again did not stay with the club for long and soon found himself playing for Rokita Brzeg. He spent 7 years with Rokita, becoming the clubs player-manager for the final 4 years of his stay. In 1958 Janecki retired from playing football and focused on management, taking his second managerial role with PKS Wołów, whom he spent 6 years with.

== Personal life ==
During his career Janecki used multiple first names, going by his birth name Ryszard Janecki, while also going by Henryk Janecki and Edmund Janecki at points of his career.

== Honours ==
AKS Chorzów

- I liga: 1947 (Third place)
