= Tropie, Lesser Poland Voivodeship =

Tropie
- Village
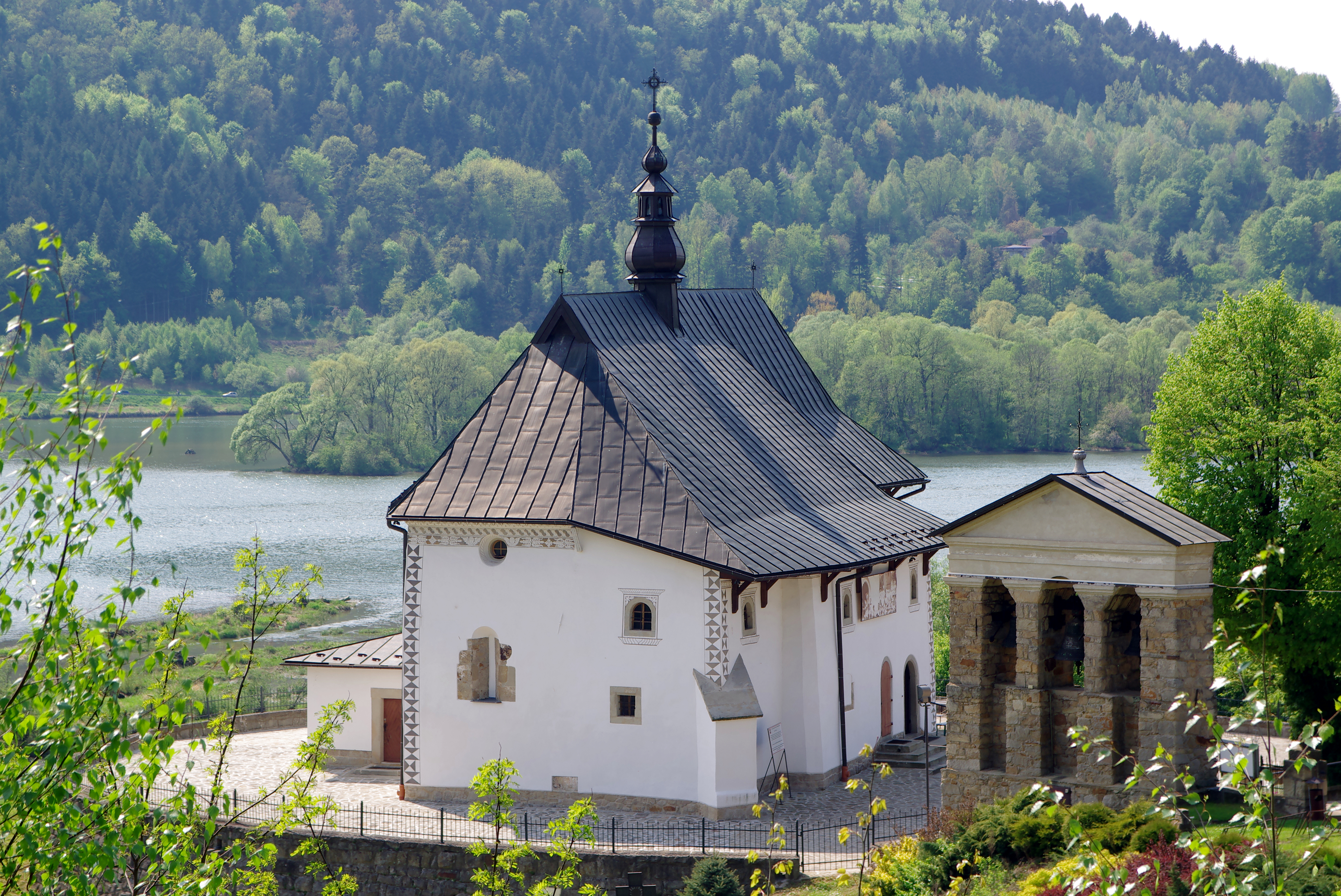
- St. Andrew and St. Benedict church

- Location within Poland
- Coordinates: 49°47′33″N 20°40′38″E
- Country: Poland
- Voivodeship: Lesser Poland
- County: Nowy Sącz
- Gmina: Gródek nad Dunajcem
- Population: 340

Tropie [ˈtrɔpʲɛ] is a village in the administrative district of Gmina Gródek nad Dunajcem, within Nowy Sącz County, Lesser Poland Voivodeship, in southern Poland.

The village's population is about 340.

There is an iconic St. Andrew and St. Benedict church, from late 11th or early 12th century, one of the oldest in Lesser Poland.
