= Janki, Grójec County =

Janki
- Village
- Location within Poland
- Coordinates: 51°48′21″N 20°39′26″E
- Country: Poland
- Voivodeship: Masovian
- County: Grójec
- Gmina: Błędów

Janki [ˈjanki] is a village in the administrative district of Gmina Błędów, within Grójec County, Masovian Voivodeship, in east-central Poland.
