= Bujne =

- Village
- Location within Poland
- Coordinates: 49°47′N 20°45′E
- Country: Poland
- Voivodeship: Lesser Poland
- County: Nowy Sącz
- Gmina: Gródek nad Dunajcem

Bujne [ˈbui̯nɛ] is a village in the administrative district of Gmina Gródek nad Dunajcem, within Nowy Sącz County, Lesser Poland Voivodeship, in southern Poland.
