= Fabianów, Masovian Voivodeship =

Fabianów
- Village
- Coordinates: 51°46′21″N 20°41′43″E
- Country: Poland
- Voivodeship: Masovian
- County: Grójec
- Gmina: Błędów

Fabianów [faˈbjanuf] is a village in the administrative district of Gmina Błędów, within Grójec County, Masovian Voivodeship, in east-central Poland.
