= Diocese of Tarnów =

Roman Catholic diocese in Poland

Coordinates: 50.0131°N 20.9871°E

Diocese of Tarnów Dioecesis Tarnoviensis Diecezja Tarnowska

Catholic
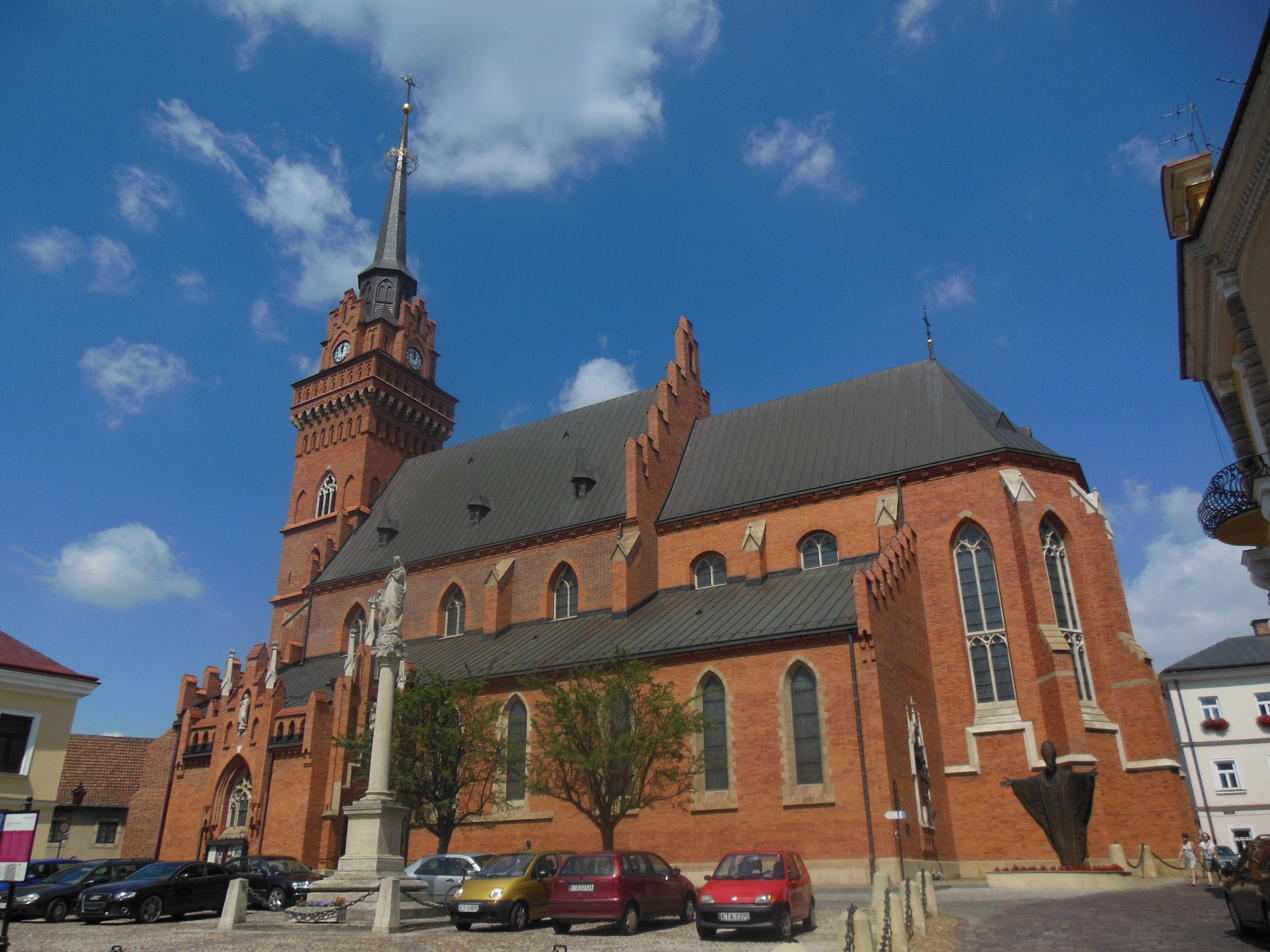
- Cathedral Basilica of the Nativity of the Virgin Mary in Tarnów

Location
- Country: Poland
- Metropolitan: Kraków

Statistics
- Area: 7,566 km^{2} (2,921 sq mi)
- Population: Total; Catholics: (as of 2022); 1,111,907; 1,105,345 (99.4%)

Information
- Denomination: Catholic Church
- Rite: Latin Rite
- Established: 1783
- Cathedral: Bazylika katedralna Narodzenia NMP w Tarnowie

Current leadership
- Pope: Leo XIV
- Bishop: Andrzej Jeż
- Metropolitan Archbishop: Marek Jędraszewski
- Auxiliary Bishops: Stanisław Salaterski; Leszek Leszkiewicz

The Diocese of Tarnów (Latin: Dioecesis Tarnoviensis) is a Latin diocese of the Catholic Church in Poland. According to Church statistics, it is the most religious diocese in Poland, with 72.5% weekly Mass attendance.

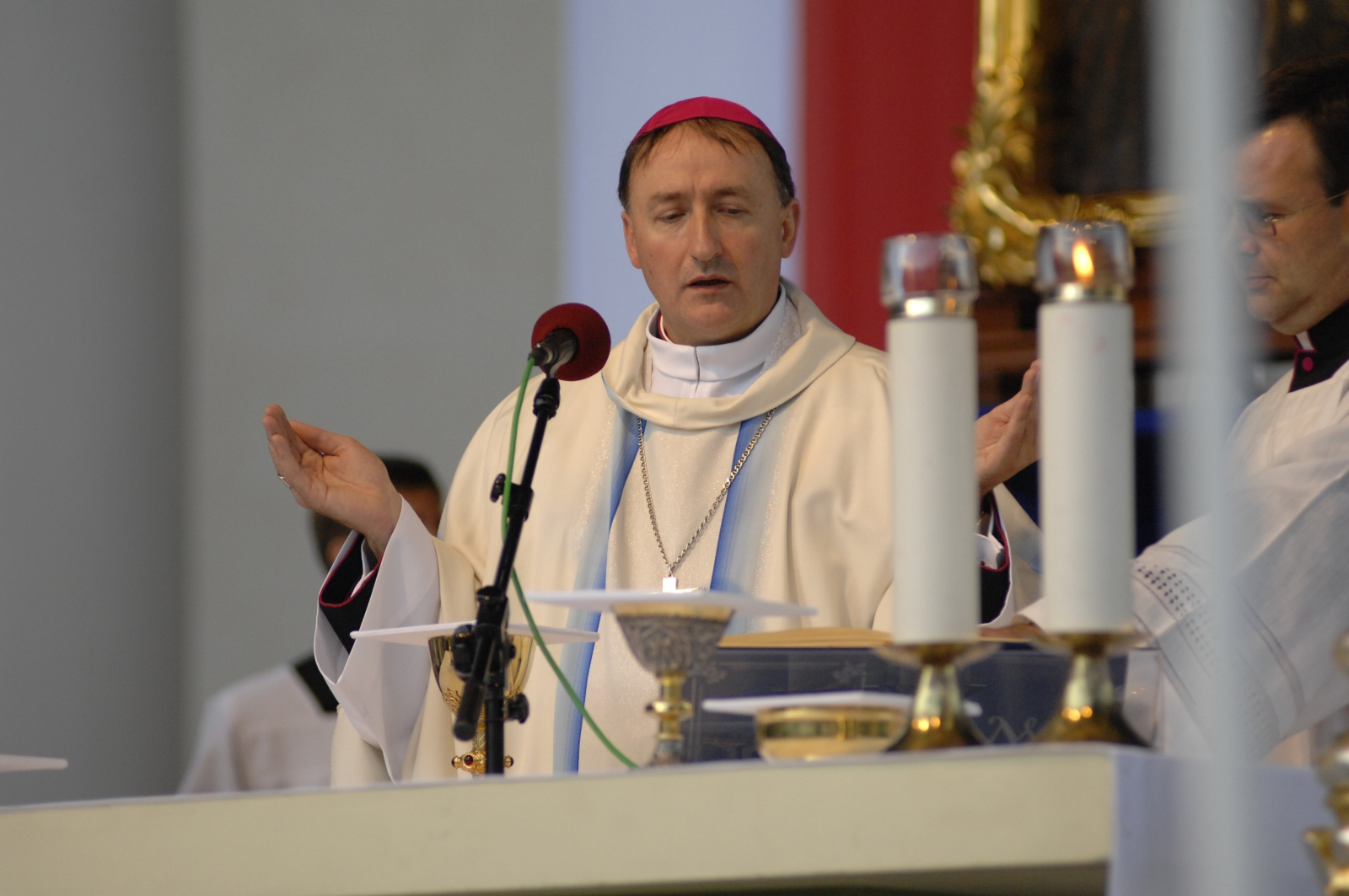
Bishop Jeż

The latest statistics, published in December 2025, showed the diocese has the highest rate of Sunday Massgoers in the country (62.3%), well ahead of the next highest dioceses of Rzeszów (52.4%) and Przemyśl (50.0%).
