= Tarnów Cathedral =

Coordinates: 50.0131°N 20.9872°E

Cathedral Basilica of the Nativity of the Blessed Virgin Mary
- Bazylika katedralna Narodzenia Najświętszej Maryi Panny w Tarnowie
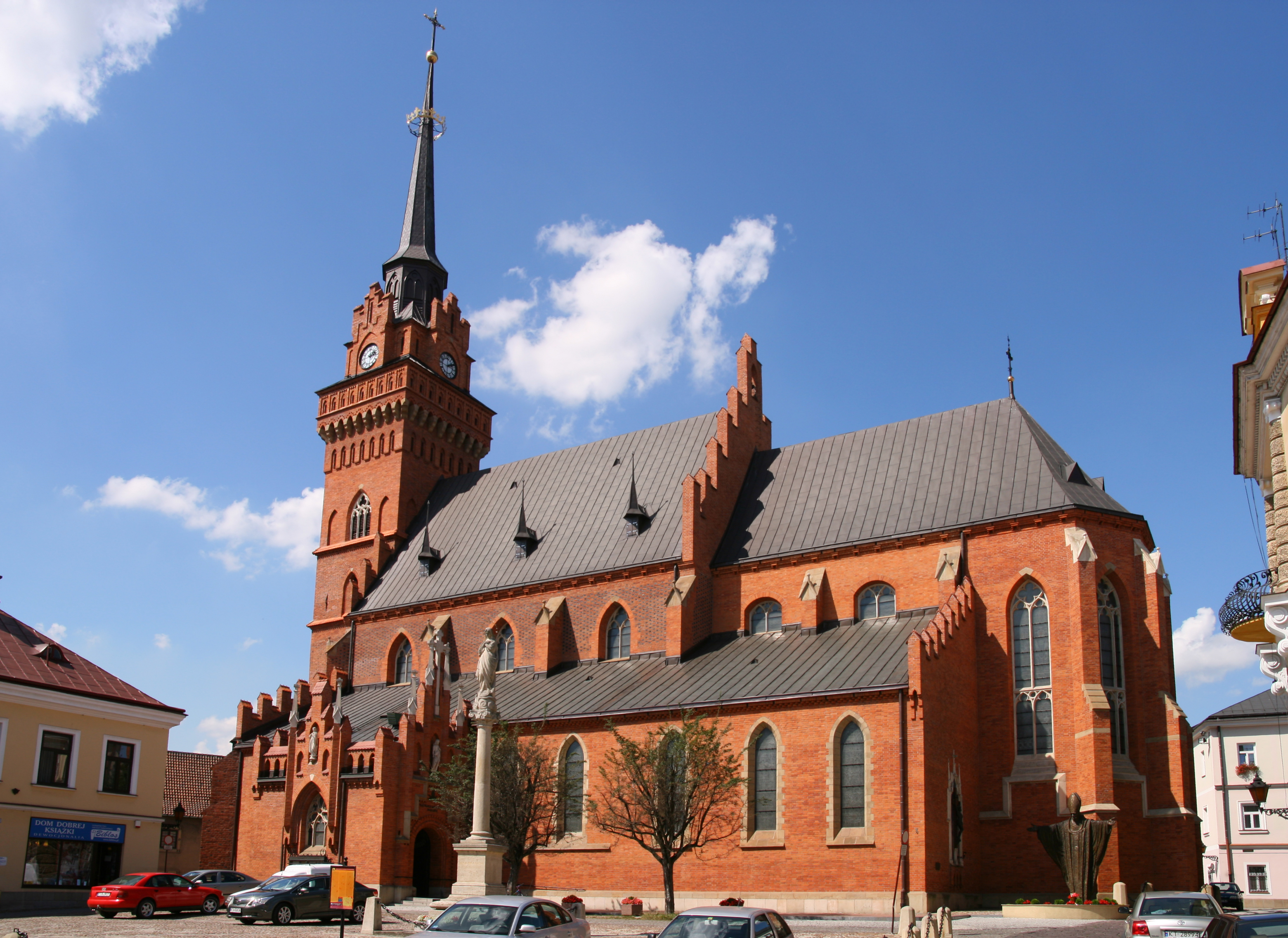
- Cathedral Basilica of the Nativity of the Blessed Virgin Mary
- Location: Tarnów
- Country: Poland
- Denomination: Roman Catholic Church

History
- Dedication: The Most Holy Virgin Mary, Queen of Poland

The Cathedral Basilica of the Nativity of the Blessed Virgin Mary (Polish: Bazylika katedralna Narodzenia Najświętszej Maryi Panny w Tarnowie ) also called Tarnów Cathedral is a religious building belonging to the Diocese of Tarnów of the Catholic Church and is located in the city of Tarnów in the European country of Poland.

It is a Gothic church, rebuilt in later periods. The building has three naves with an elongated chancel and west tower added that one rises 72 meters.

It is a cathedral dedicated to the Nativity of the Virgin Mary from 1783 and Basilica since 1972. In the oldest part of the church was built at the current location of the city in 1330.

It was visited by Pope John Paul II in 1987.

== See also ==
- Roman Catholicism in Poland
- Cathedral Basilica of the Nativity of the Blessed Virgin Mary

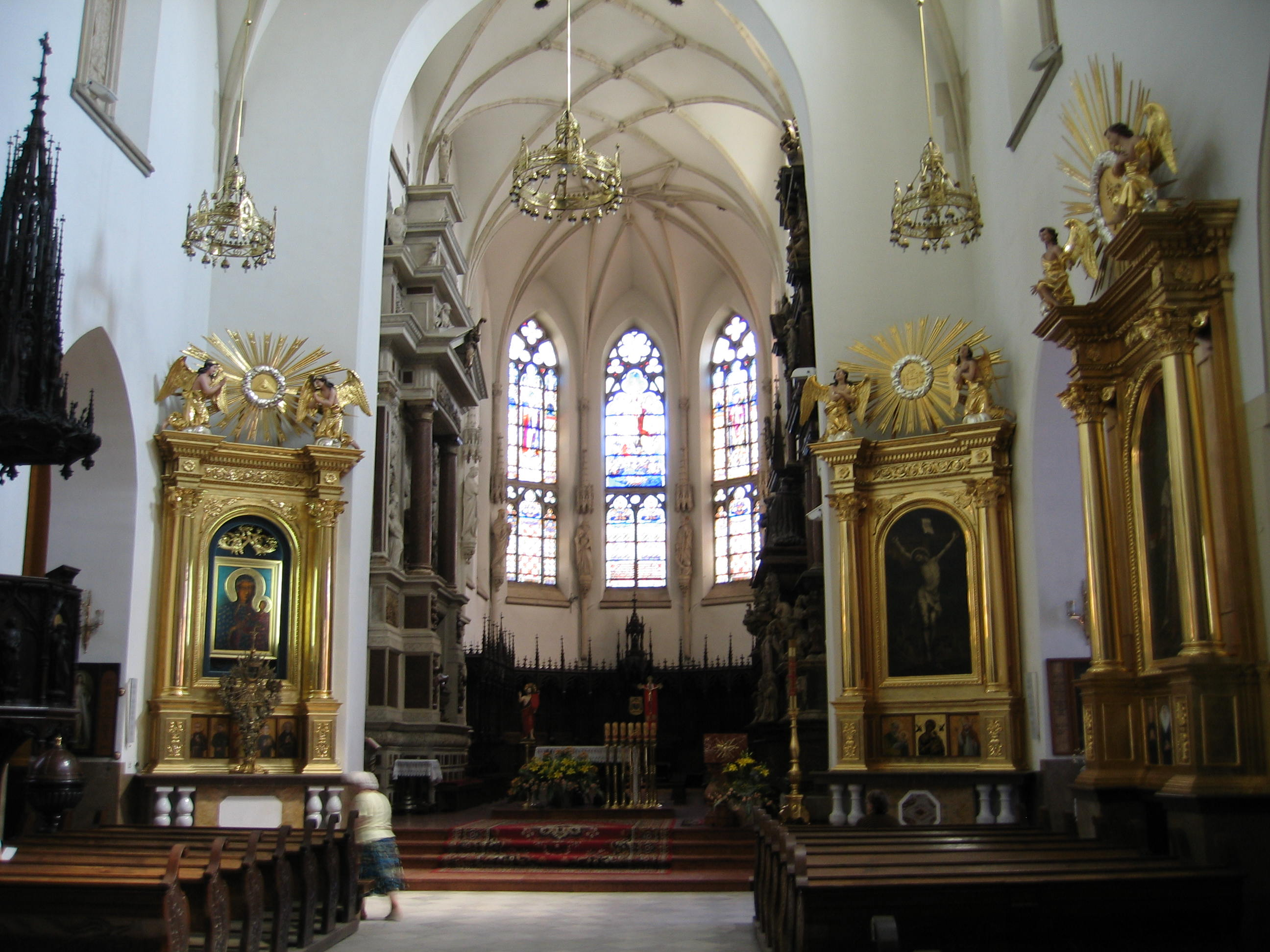
Internal view
