= Lipie, Lesser Poland Voivodeship =

Lipie
- Village
- Location within Poland
- Coordinates: 49°43′30″N 20°43′35″E
- Country: Poland
- Voivodeship: Lesser Poland
- County: Nowy Sącz
- Gmina: Gródek nad Dunajcem

Lipie [ˈlʲipʲɛ] is a village in the administrative district of Gmina Gródek nad Dunajcem, within Nowy Sącz County, Lesser Poland Voivodeship, in southern Poland.
