= Polna =

Polna may refer to:

- Polná, a town in the Vysočina Region of the Czech Republic
  - Polná Affair, a series of anti-semitic trials around 1900
- Polná (Hazlov), a village in Karlovy Vary Region, Czech Republic
- Polna, Poland, a village in Lesser Poland Voivodeship, Poland
- Polna, Russia, a rural locality (a village) in Gdovsky District of Pskov Oblast, Russia
