= Stanisław Kogut =

Polish politician (1953–2020)

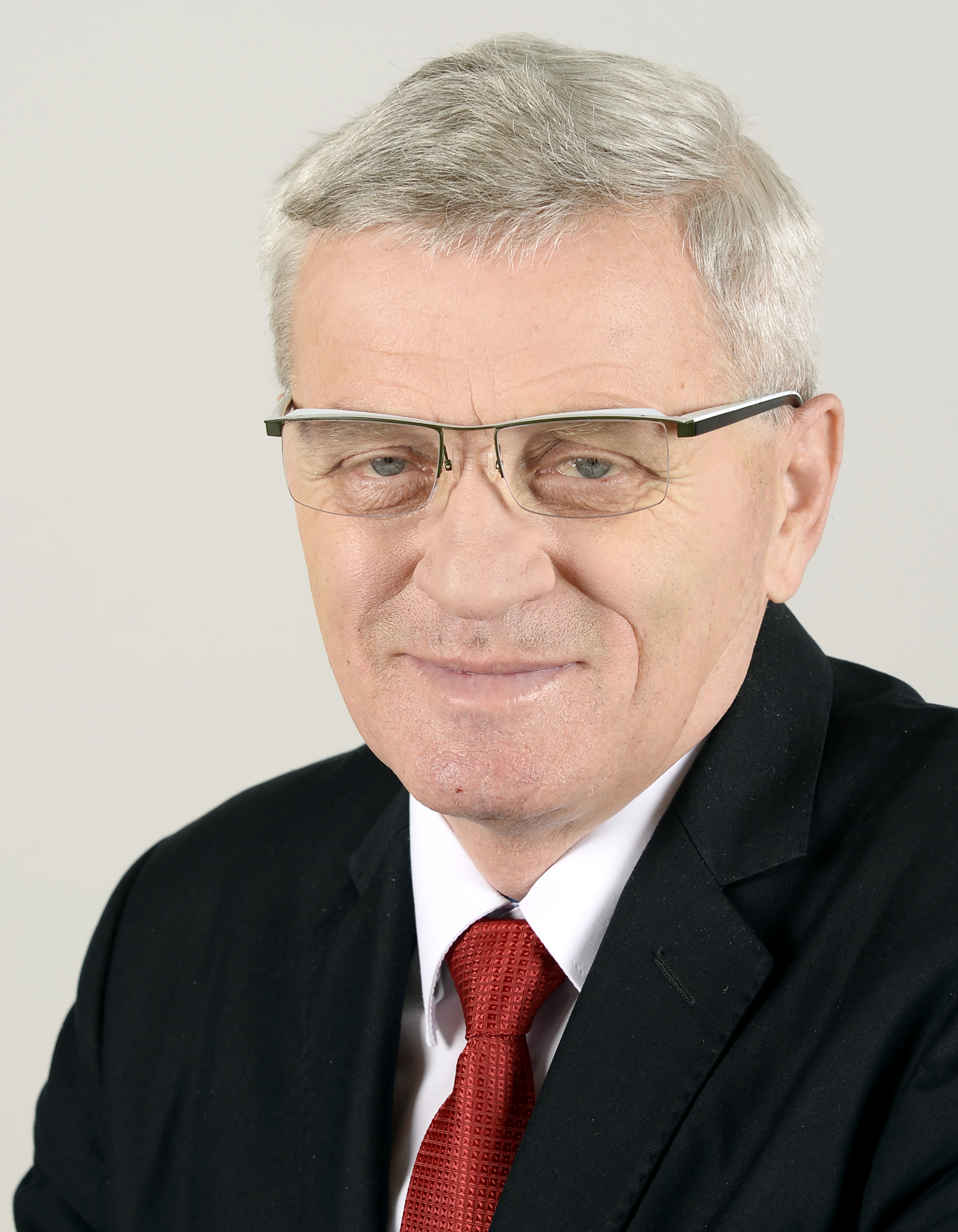
- Stanisław Kogut (2015)
- Born: 29 October 1953; Biała Niżna, Poland
- Died: 18 October 2020 (aged 66); Gorlice, Poland
- Occupation: Politician

Stanisław Kogut (29 October 1953 – 18 October 2020) was a Polish politician who was a member of the Polish Senate from 2005 to 2019 as a member of the Law and Justice party.

He died from COVID-19 during the COVID-19 pandemic in Poland, eleven days short from his 67th birthday.
