= Józef Motyka =

Polish botanist and lichenologist

- Born: 23 March 1900; Kąclowa, Poland
- Died: 6 July 1984 (aged 84); Lublin, Poland
- Occupations: Botanist, lichenologist
- Notable work: Published a total of four textbooks, six monographs, 54 papers, and two general-audience books

Józef Motyka (23 March 1900 – 6 July 1984) was a Polish botanist and lichenologist.

== Early live and education ==
Motyka was born on 23 March 1900 in Kąclowa. He obtained his PhD in 1925 at the Jagiellonian University in Kraków for his studies on the ecology of saxicolous lichens (growing on or living among rocks) in Europe.

== Early career ==
Afterwards, he spent several years researching the large lichen genus Usnea, culminating in the publication of a two-volume monograph during 1936–1938. During the Second World War he was employed in the Botanical Garden in Lwow. In 1944 he returned to his birthplace, Kąclowa, and began teaching at the Gymnasium in nearby Grybów. A year later Motyka was appointed as Director of the Plant Geography and Systematics department at the Maria Curie-Skłodowska University in Lublin, and soon after became an associate professor. For the next decade he worked largely on the distribution and ecology of vascular plants.

== Publications ==
Returning to work on lichens in the mid-1950s, Motyka studied Poland's lichen flora and published papers on the families Parmeliaceae, Cladoniaceae, Acarosporaceae, Umbilicariaceae, and Thelocarpaceae. He became a full Professor in 1960. He eventually published a total of four textbooks, six monographs, 54 papers, and two general-audience books.

Motyka's draft manuscripts on the lecanoroid lichens were published posthumously in 1995–1996 by his daughter Maria Motyka-Zgłobicka and J. Sieminska, in a four-volume work titled Lecanoraceae. This massive work introduced more than 220 new species, and over 300 new combinations. However, there were several problems in Motyka's text, such as the use of outdated generic concepts, little discussion of why taxonomic decisions were made, and omissions of important information for many of the newly described species. For these reasons, Helge Thorsten Lumbsch and colleagues made a formal proposal to consider this work opera utique oppressa—a suppressed work that is not taxonomically valid.

== Recognition ==
Motyka was awarded the Polonia Restituta and Golden Cross of Merit for his academic work.

=== Eponymous species ===
Several lichens have been named in honor of Józef Motyka:

- Alectoria motykae D.Hawksw.
- Alectoria motykana Bystrek
- Ramalina motykana Bystrek
- Usnea motykae Räsänen
- Usnea motykana Bystrek & Wójciak

== See also ==
- Category:Taxa named by Józef Motyka
