= Polna, Poland =

Polna
- Village
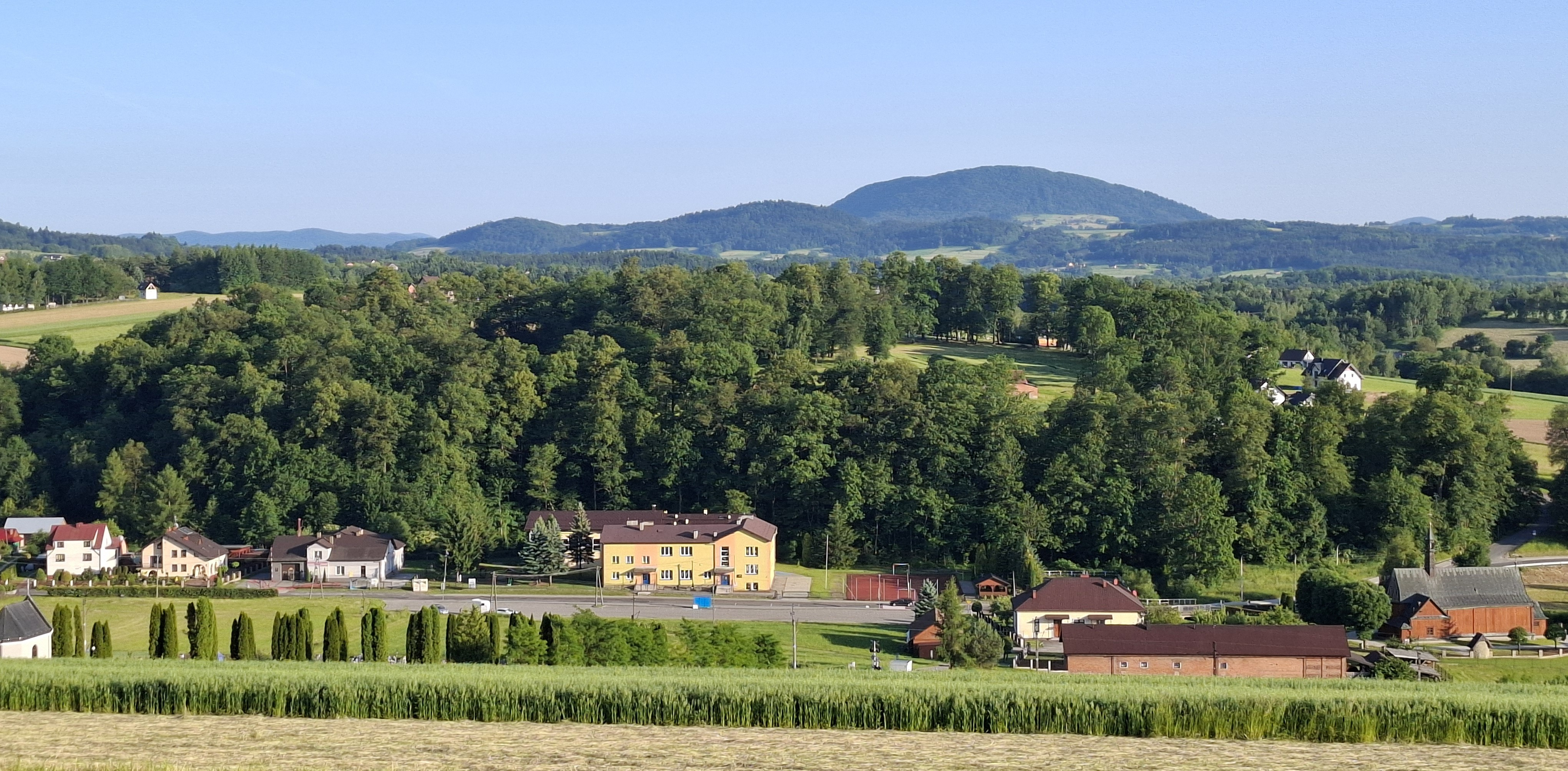

- Location within Poland
- Coordinates: 49°40′22″N 20°59′06″E
- Country: Poland
- Voivodeship: Lesser Poland
- County: Nowy Sącz
- Gmina: Grybów

Polna [ˈpɔlna] is a village in the administrative district of Gmina Grybów, within Nowy Sącz County, Lesser Poland Voivodeship, in southern Poland.

== Natural environment ==
Polna is located at the border between Rożnow-Ciężkowice Foothill and Low Beskid mountain range. From the hills of Polna a vast panorama can be seen. This includes: Zielona Góra (Eng. Green Mountain - 690 m a.s.l.) and Maślana Góra (Eng. "Butter Mountain" - 753 m a.s.l.) at the south east direction, Chełm (Eng. Helmet - 779 m a.s.l.) at south, Jaworze (887 m a.s.l.) - south-west, Rosochatka (753 m a.s.l.) & Jodłowa (715 m a.s.l.) at west. The village’s surroundings have diverse geological structure and the Śląska and Magurska nappes are fold there. Near Polna is a reservoir with 300-year-old oaks and linden trees. In the forest of Polna, at one of the trails to Maślana Góra, the St John’s Spring can be found. It is believed by some that the water from the spring heals eye diseases.

== Education ==
There is a primary education school in Polna: http://szppolna.republika.pl

== Historical architecture ==
=== The Church of St Andrew the Apostle, Polna ===
The history of Polna parish dates back to the second half of the 14th century. The Church of St. Andrew the Apostle was erected in place of the older temple which was founded in 1297 by Ritter Wizlans of Melsztyn, as mentioned by the 15th century chronicler, Jan Dlugosz, in his work "Liber beneficiorum". The construction of the present church took place in the 16th century. The church is in the late Gothic style; there is one main nave with a chancel and an apse, ending with a three-sided tower.

In 1820 the church was significantly rebuilt, thanks to the efforts of the owner of the village, Tekla Stadnicka, and the front of the nave from the west was extended. Following this, in 1901 a new bell tower was built, in 1910 the rectory building was added, and between 1920 and 1939, the new farm buildings were constructed. In the years 2001–2010 numerous conservation work was carried out, including the restoration of the historic murals in the chancel.

The polychrome interior (murals) of the church is worth special attention. This is a multi-coloured painted decoration, consisting of several layers. The oldest layer covers the walls around the main altar and the nave. It dates back to 1595–1607 and was most likely founded by Nicholas and Elizabeth of Gładysz. It shows a series of 29 scenes devoted to the life and passion of Christ. On the southern wall can be seen the emblems of the founders (the Griffin and Trumpet signs). Over the door to the side porch is the scene of the decapitation of St. John the Baptist. The remaining surface of the walls of the nave is decorated by a newer layer - paintings dating back to the second half of the 17th century. The newest layer shows scenes of the Last Judgment and the figures of St. Peter and St. Paul. Historic murals were discovered during the restoration work carried out between 1965 and 1966. A year later the image of Our Lady Help of Christians of the late 16th century was discovered. Currently it is located on the main altar. The Baroque side altars from the late 18th century are noteworthy as well. On the left one is a mid-18th century image of St. Margaret and next to it - the 18th century pulpit. The oldest pieces in the church are the font and stoup of the 16th century.

It is worth mentioning that between 1882 and 1883 the blessed Jan Balicki was working in Polna parish. On 18 August 2002 he was beatified by Pope John Paul II. An image commemorating him is located in the northern part of the church.

This church is included as one of the 251 objects on the Wooden Architecture Trail in the province of Małopolska [Lesser Poland], Southern Poland.

There is a virtual tour of the church in four language versions, which is available at www.korona3d.pl
