= Chodorowa =

- Village
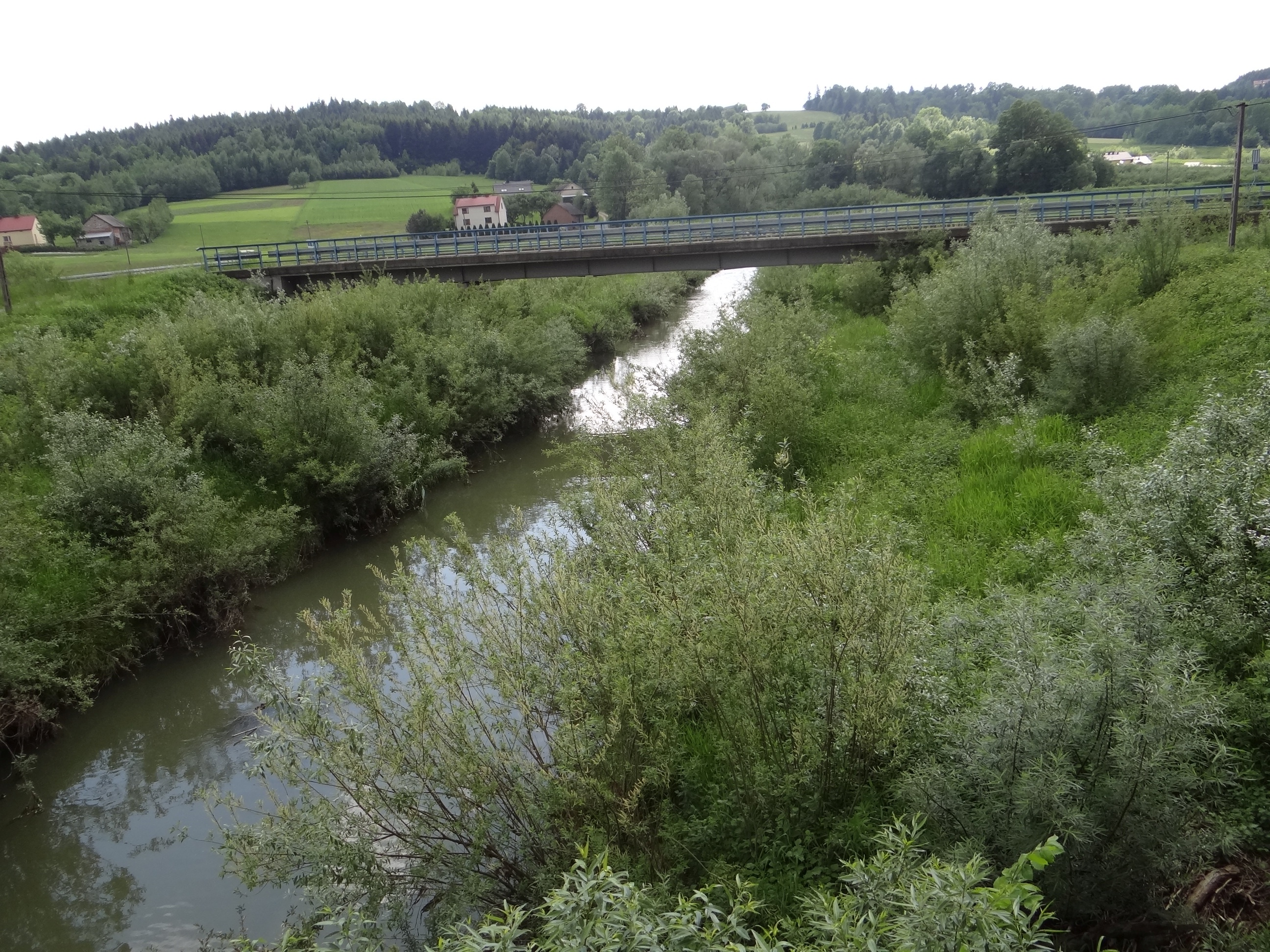

- Location within Poland
- Coordinates: 49°39′30″N 20°55′50″E
- Country: Poland
- Voivodeship: Lesser Poland
- County: Nowy Sącz
- Gmina: Grybów
- Population: 310

Chodorowa [xɔdɔˈrɔva] is a village in the administrative district of Gmina Grybów, within Nowy Sącz County, Lesser Poland Voivodeship, in southern Poland.
