= Krużlowa Wyżna =

- Village
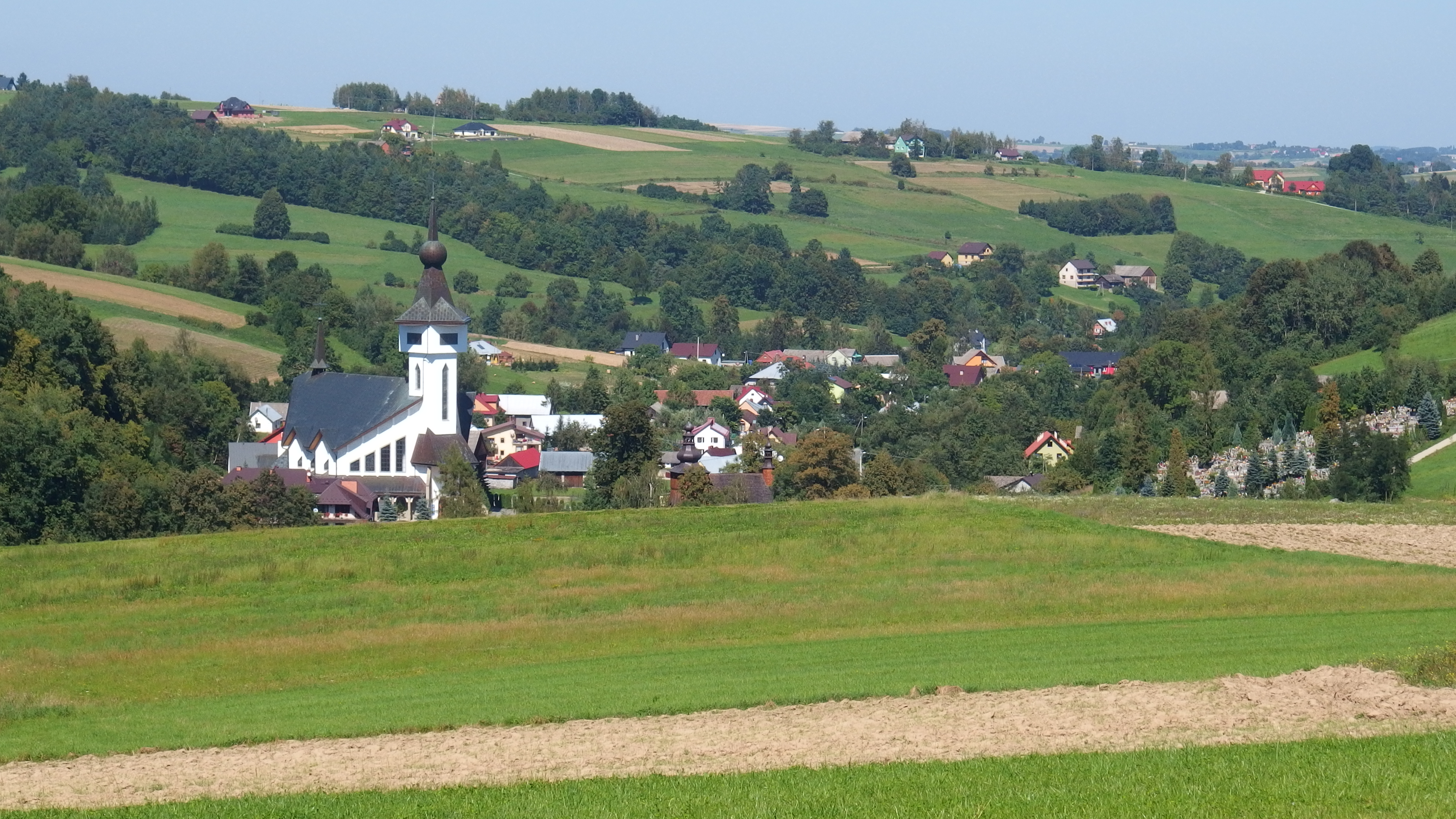

- Location within Poland
- Coordinates: 49°38′N 20°53′E
- Country: Poland
- Voivodeship: Lesser Poland
- County: Nowy Sącz
- Gmina: Grybów
- Population: 1,440

Krużlowa Wyżna [kruˈʐlɔva ˈvɨʐna] is a village in the administrative district of Gmina Grybów, within Nowy Sącz County, Lesser Poland Voivodeship, in southern Poland.

== See also ==
- Beautiful Virgin Mary from Krużlowa

== Gallery ==
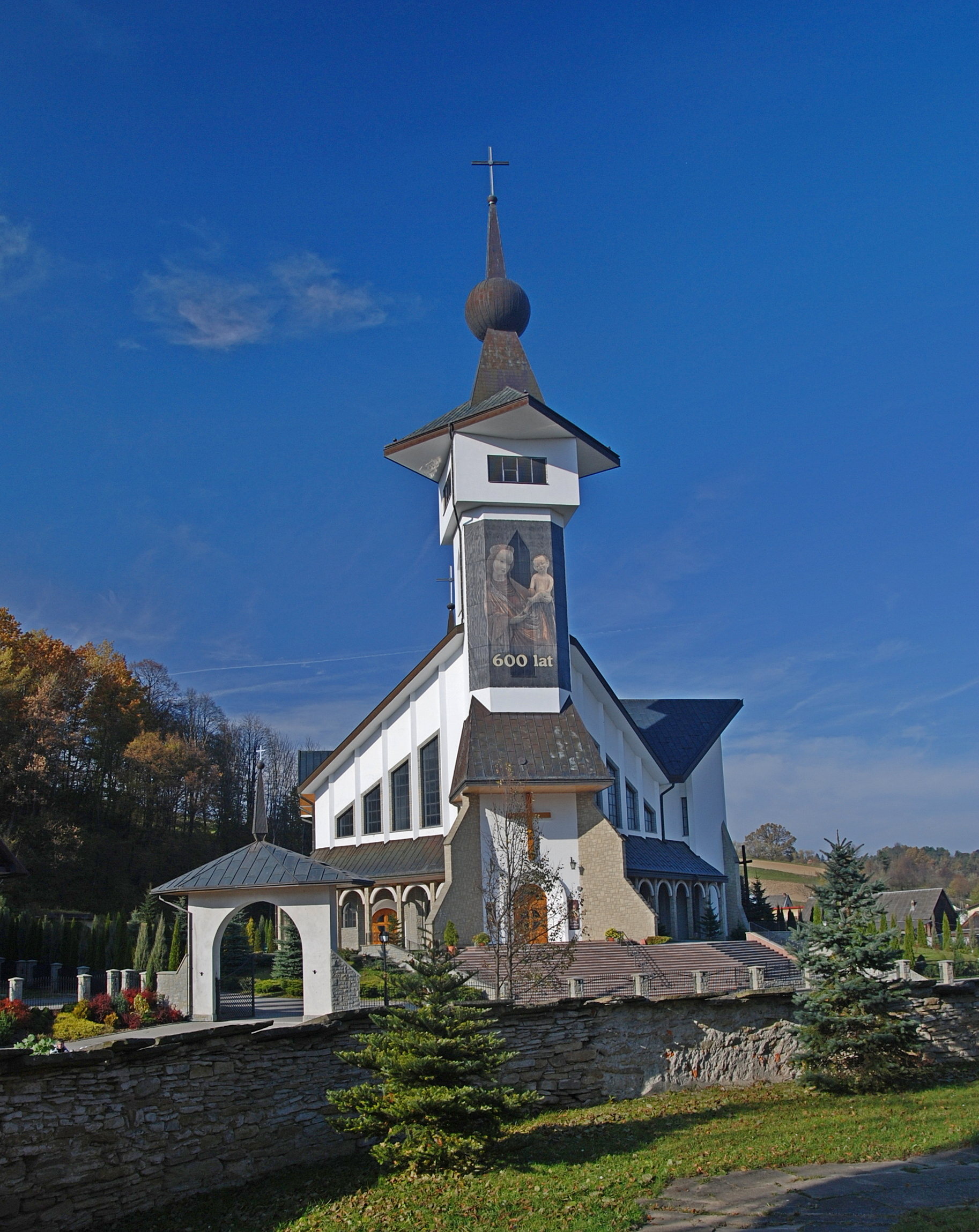
New parish church

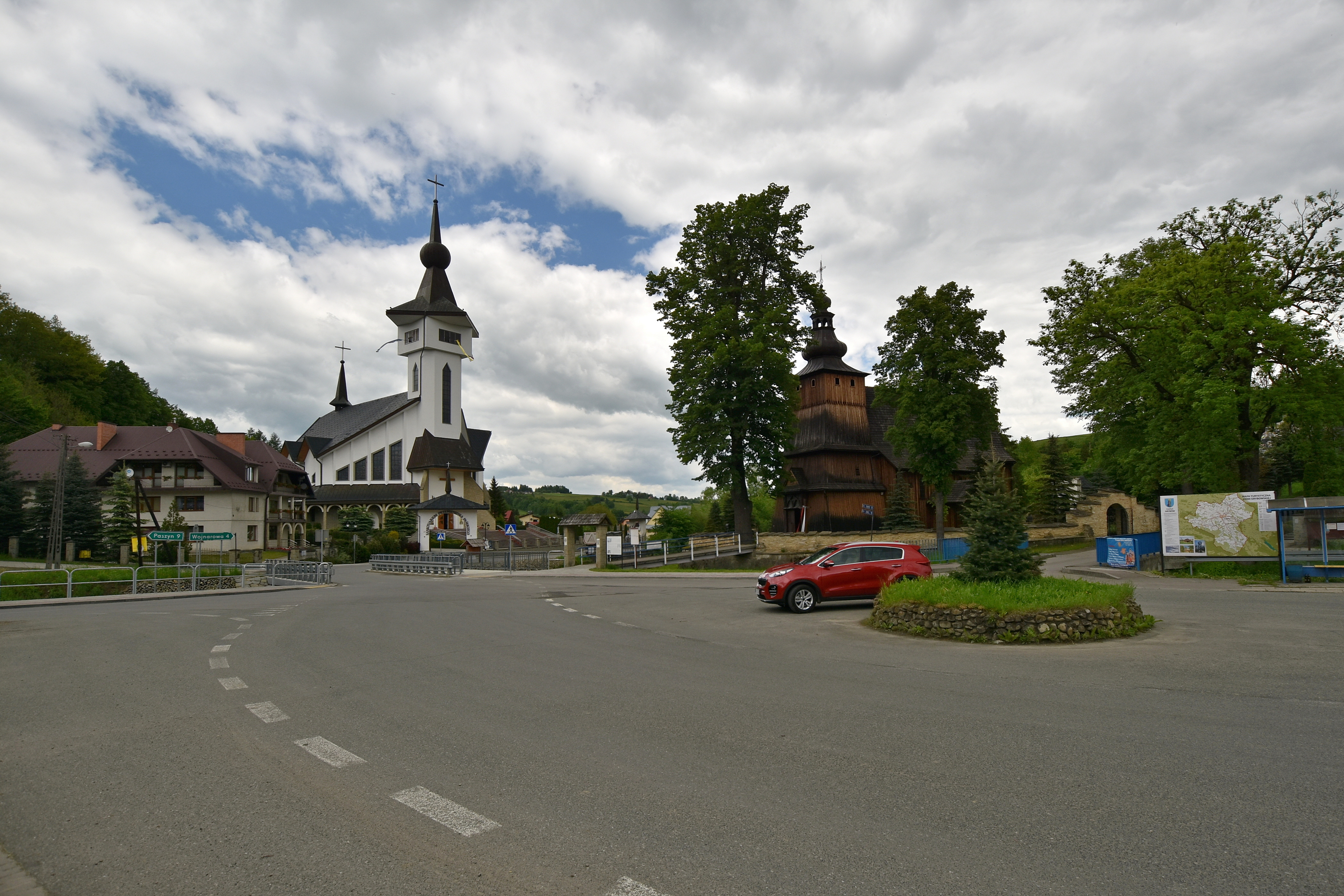
The center of the village

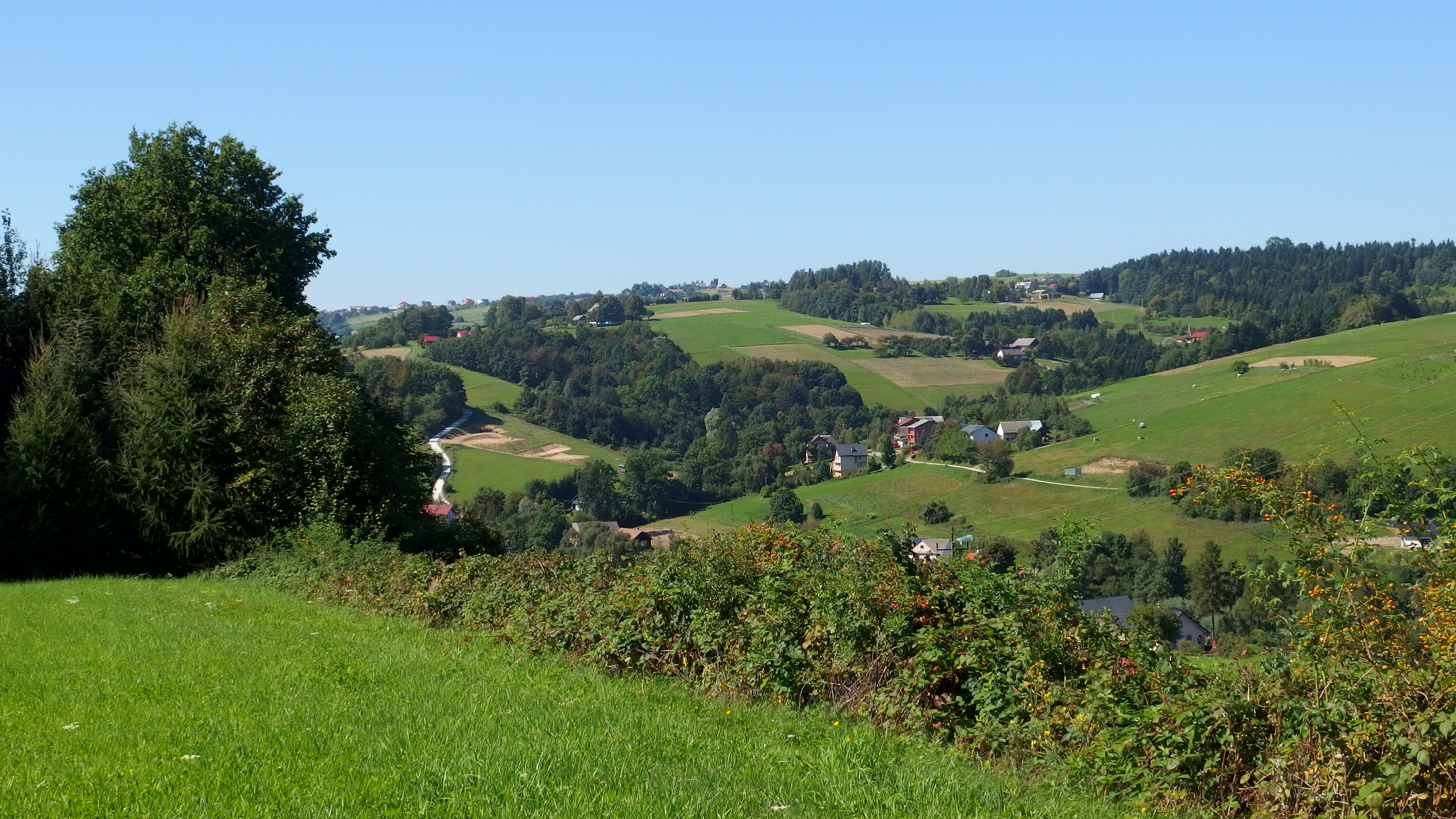
Panorama of the village

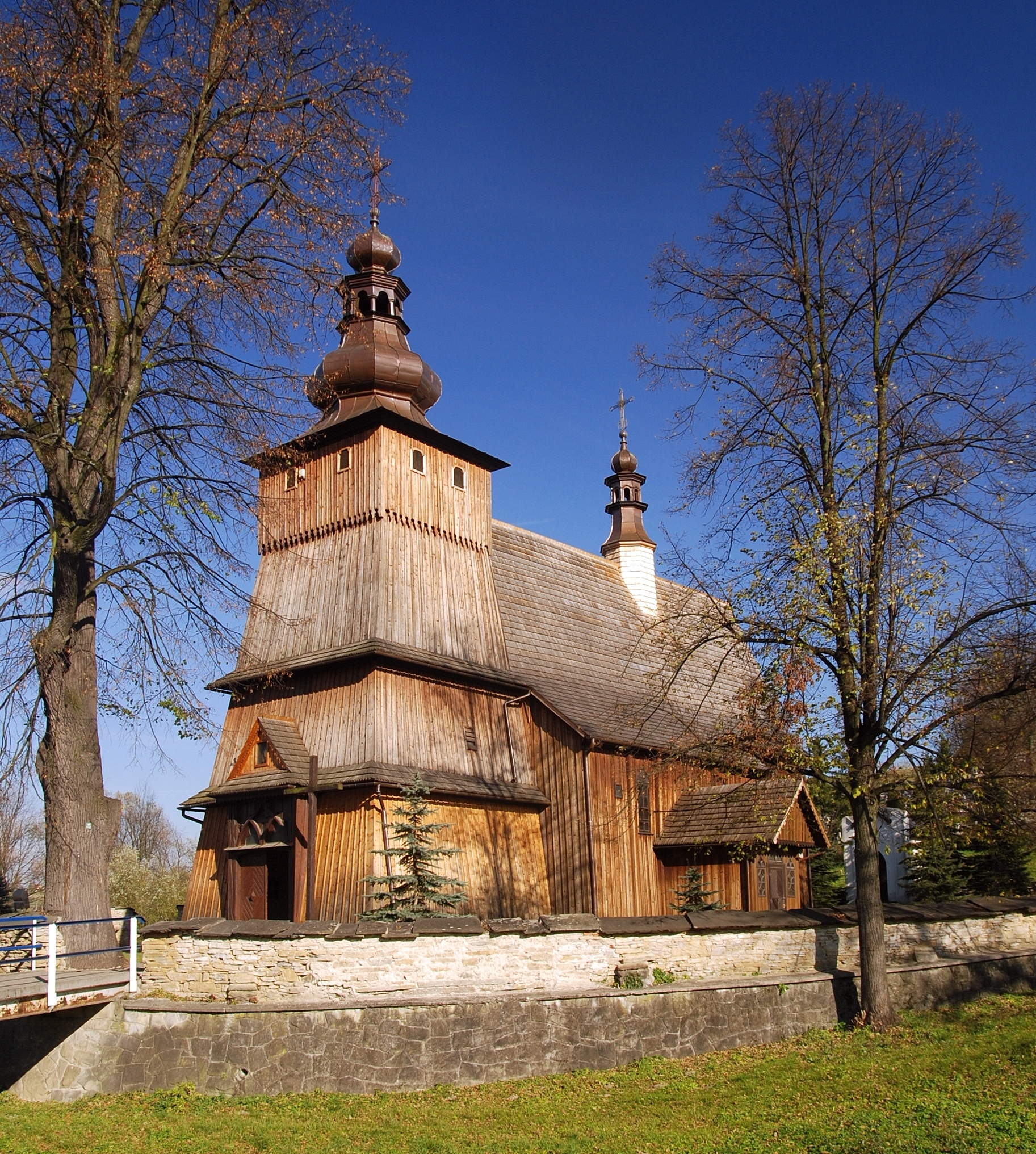
Church of the Nativity of the Virgin Mary

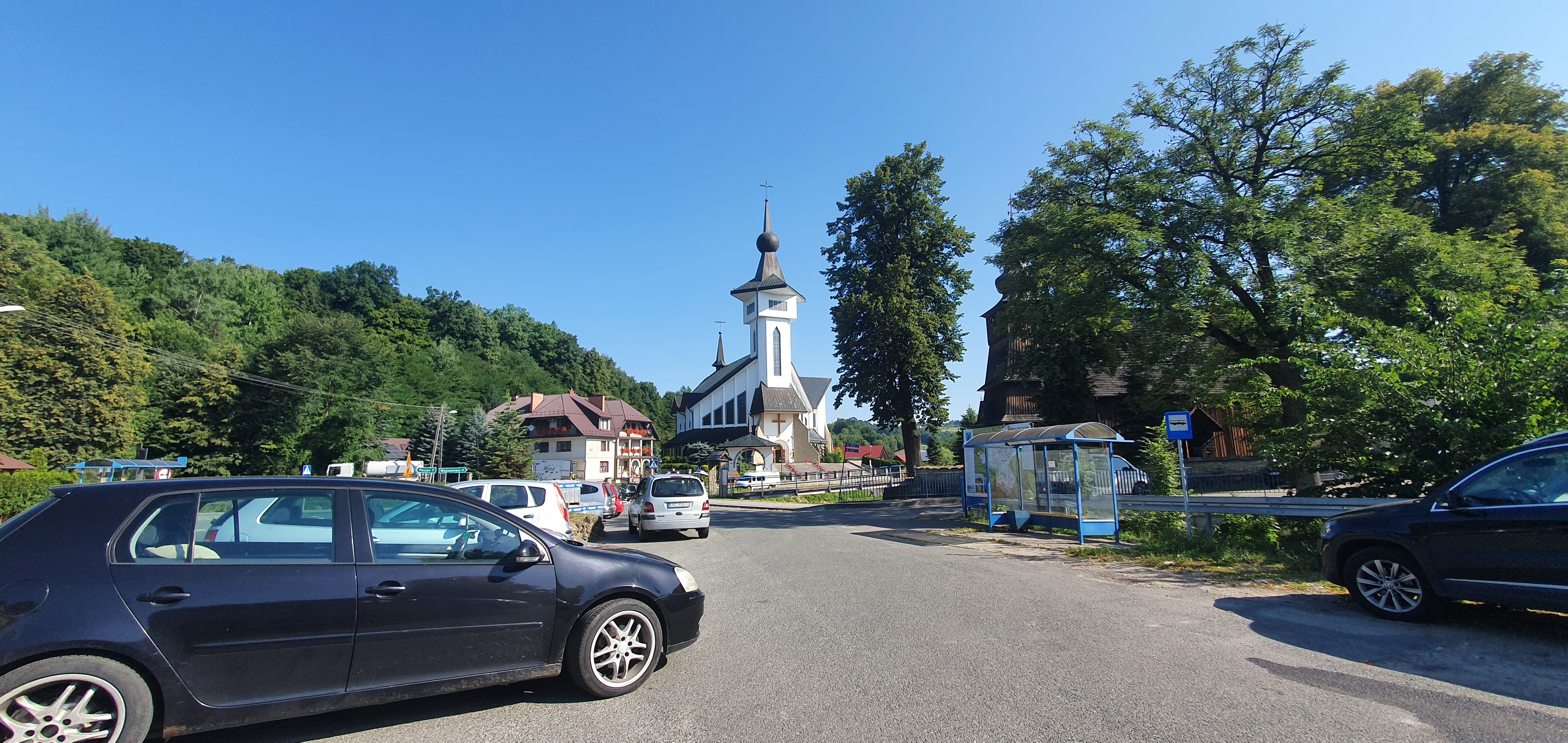
New Church of the Nativity of the Virgin Mary
