= Cieniawa =

- Village
- Location within Poland
- Coordinates: 49°37′N 20°51′E
- Country: Poland
- Voivodeship: Lesser Poland
- County: Nowy Sącz
- Gmina: Grybów
- Population (approx.): 1,200
- Website: https://web.archive.org/web/20080916231807/http://www.cieniawa.net.pl/

Cieniawa [t͡ɕɛˈɲava] is a village in the administrative district of Gmina Grybów, within Nowy Sącz County, Lesser Poland Voivodeship, in southern Poland.

The village has an approximate population of 1,200.
