= Gródek, Lesser Poland Voivodeship =

Gródek
- Village
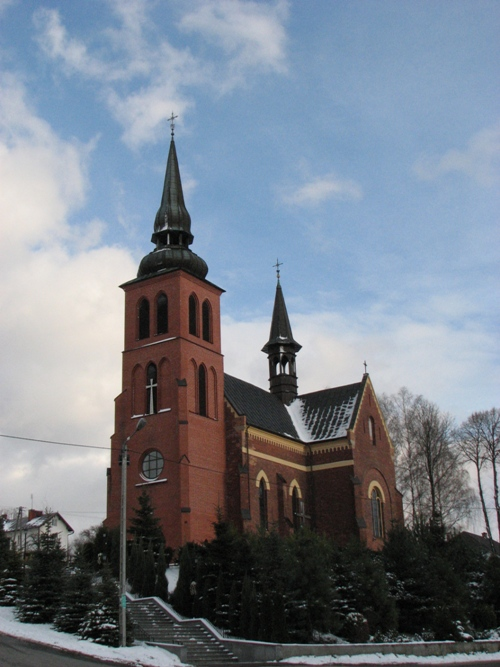
- Church in Gródek

- Location within Poland
- Coordinates: 49°37′53″N 21°00′22″E
- Country: Poland
- Voivodeship: Lesser Poland
- County: Nowy Sącz
- Gmina: Grybów
- Population: 1,100

Gródek [ˈɡrudɛk] is a village in the administrative district of Gmina Grybów, within Nowy Sącz County, Lesser Poland Voivodeship, in southern Poland.

The village is the namesake of a Georg Trakl poem about the coming of fall and death.
