= Gmina Grybów =

Gmina Grybów Grybów Commune
- Gmina
- Coat of arms
- Interactive map of Gmina Grybów
- Coordinates (Grybów): 49°37′28″N 20°56′54″E
- Country: Poland
- Voivodeship: Lesser Poland
- County: Nowy Sącz County
- Seat: Grybów

Area
  - Total: 152.99 km^{2} (59.07 sq mi)

Population (2006)
  - Total: 22,436
  - Density: 146.65/km^{2} (379.82/sq mi)
- Website: https://www.gminagrybow.pl

Gmina Grybów is a rural gmina (administrative district) in Nowy Sącz County, Lesser Poland Voivodeship, in southern Poland. Its seat is the town of Grybów, although the town is not part of the territory of the gmina.

The gmina covers an area of 152.99 square kilometres (59.1 sq mi), and as of 2024 its total population is 22,436.

== Villages ==
Gmina Grybów contains the villages and settlements of Biała Niżna, Binczarowa, Chodorowa, Cieniawa, Florynka, Gródek, Kąclowa, Krużlowa Niżna, Krużlowa Wyżna, Polna, Ptaszkowa, Siołkowa, Stara Wieś, Stróże, Wawrzka and Wyskitna.

== Neighbouring gminas ==
Gmina Grybów is bordered by the town of Grybów and by the gminas of Bobowa, Chełmiec, Gorlice, Kamionka Wielka, Korzenna, Krynica-Zdrój, Łabowa, Łużna, Ropa and Uście Gorlickie.
