= Siołkowa =

- Village
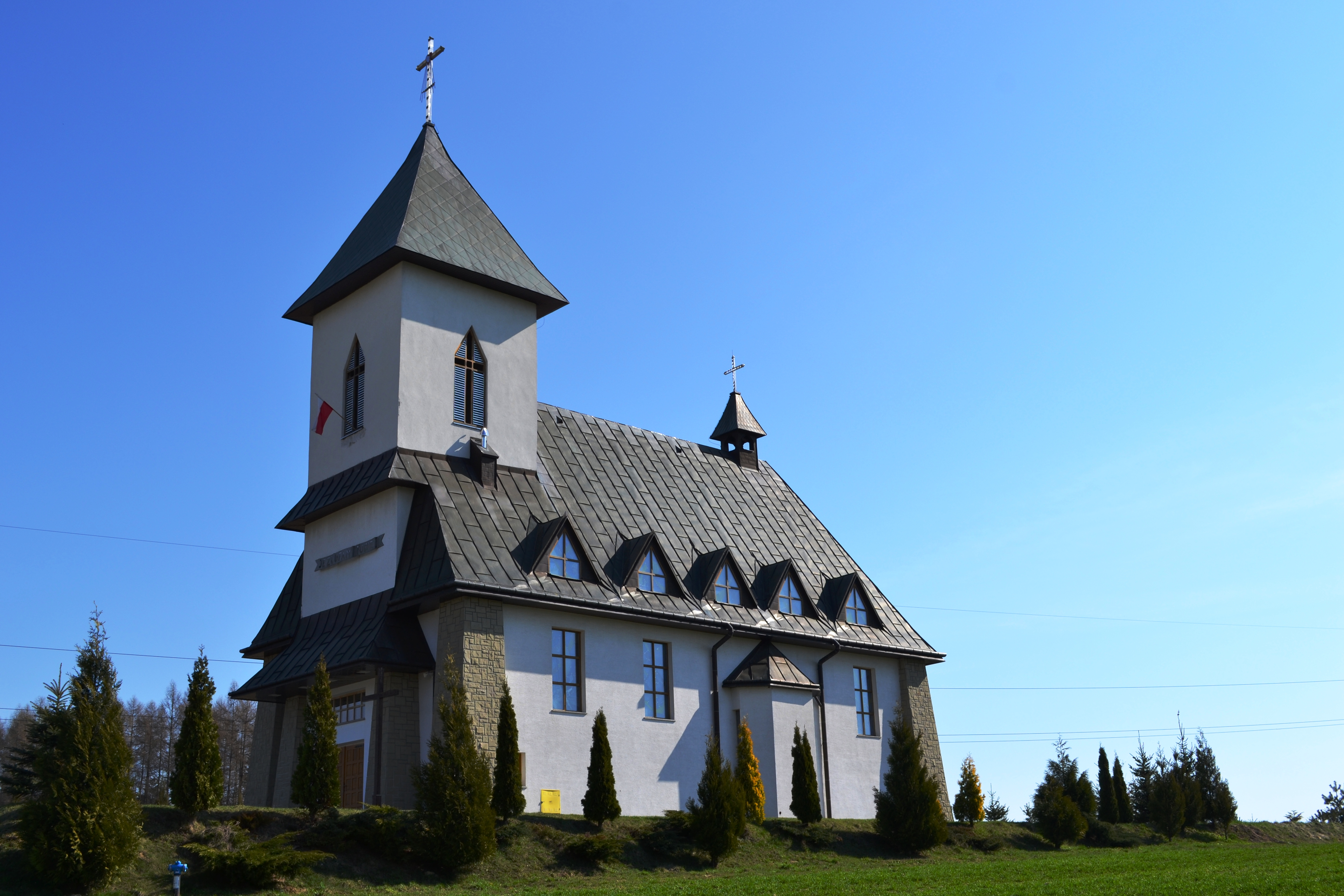
- Catholic church

- Location within Poland
- Coordinates: 49°38′13″N 20°56′7″E
- Country: Poland
- Voivodeship: Lesser Poland
- County: Nowy Sącz
- Gmina: Grybów
- Population: 1,800

Siołkowa [ɕɔu̯ˈkɔva] is a village in the administrative district of Gmina Grybów, within Nowy Sącz County, Lesser Poland Voivodeship, in southern Poland.
