= Wyskitna =

- Village
- Location within Poland
- Coordinates: 49°40′N 21°1′E
- Country: Poland
- Voivodeship: Lesser Poland
- County: Nowy Sącz
- Gmina: Grybów
- Population: 600

Wyskitna [vɨsˈkʲitna] is a village in the administrative district of Gmina Grybów, within Nowy Sącz County, Lesser Poland Voivodeship, in southern Poland.
