= Stara Wieś, Nowy Sącz County =

Stara Wieś
- Village
- Location within Poland
- Coordinates: 49°38′13″N 20°53′5″E
- Country: Poland
- Voivodeship: Lesser Poland
- County: Nowy Sącz
- Gmina: Grybów
- Population: 840

Stara Wieś [ˈstara ˈvʲɛɕ] is a village in the administrative district of Gmina Grybów, within Nowy Sącz County, Lesser Poland Voivodeship, in southern Poland.
