= Krużlowa Niżna =

- Village
- Location within Poland
- Coordinates: 49°39′4″N 20°52′19″E
- Country: Poland
- Voivodeship: Lesser Poland
- County: Nowy Sącz
- Gmina: Grybów
- Highest elevation: 510 m (1,670 ft)
- Lowest elevation: 300 m (980 ft)
- Population: 930

Krużlowa Niżna [kruˈʐlɔva ˈɲiʐna] is a village in the administrative district of Gmina Grybów, within Nowy Sącz County, Lesser Poland Voivodeship, in southern Poland.
