= Wawrzka =

- Village
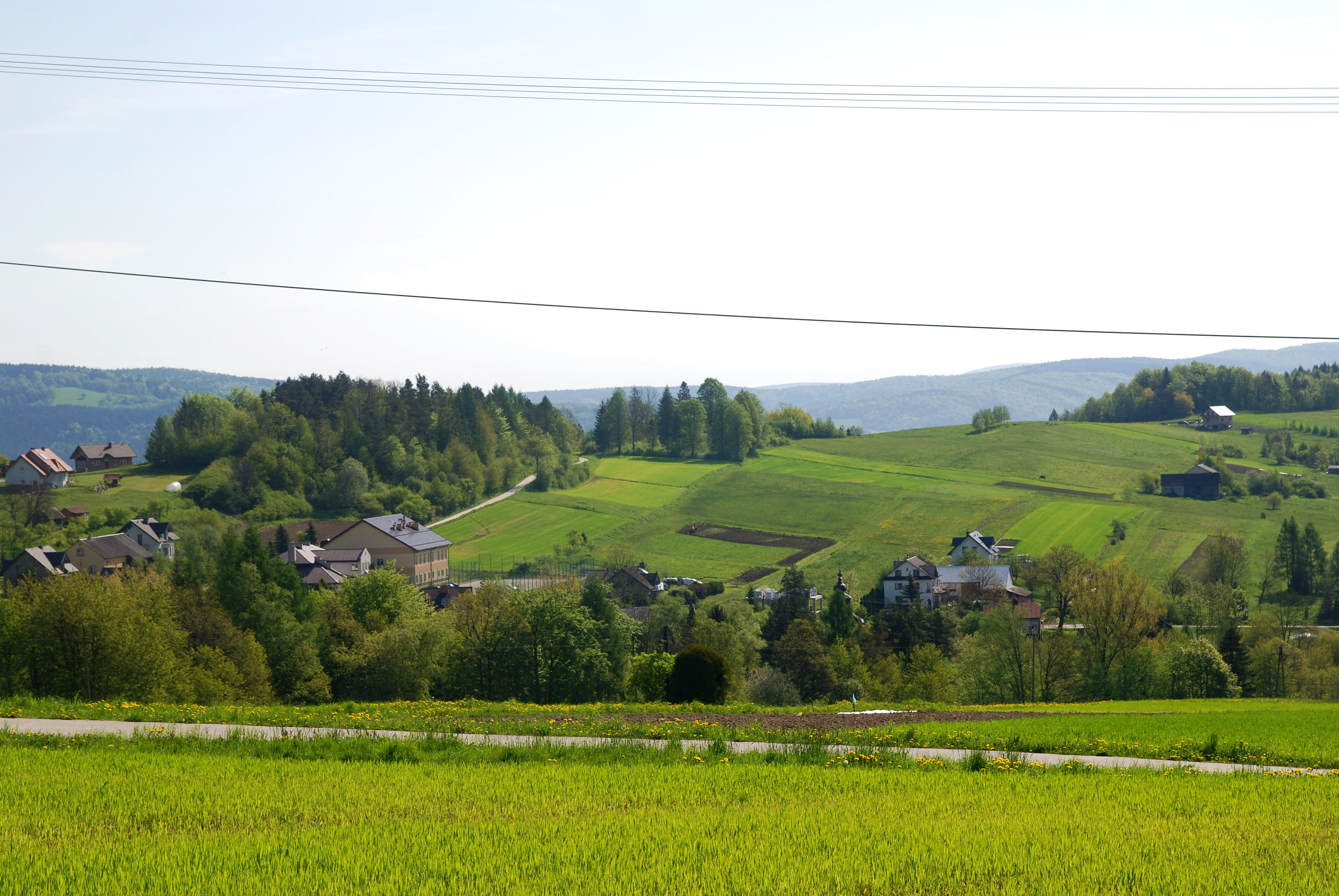

- Location within Poland
- Coordinates: 49°35′N 20°59′E
- Country: Poland
- Voivodeship: Lesser Poland
- County: Nowy Sącz
- Gmina: Grybów

Wawrzka [ˈvafʂka] (Note: Lemko dialect Rusyn: Вафка, Vafka) is a village in the administrative district of Gmina Grybów, within Nowy Sącz County, Lesser Poland Voivodeship, in southern Poland.

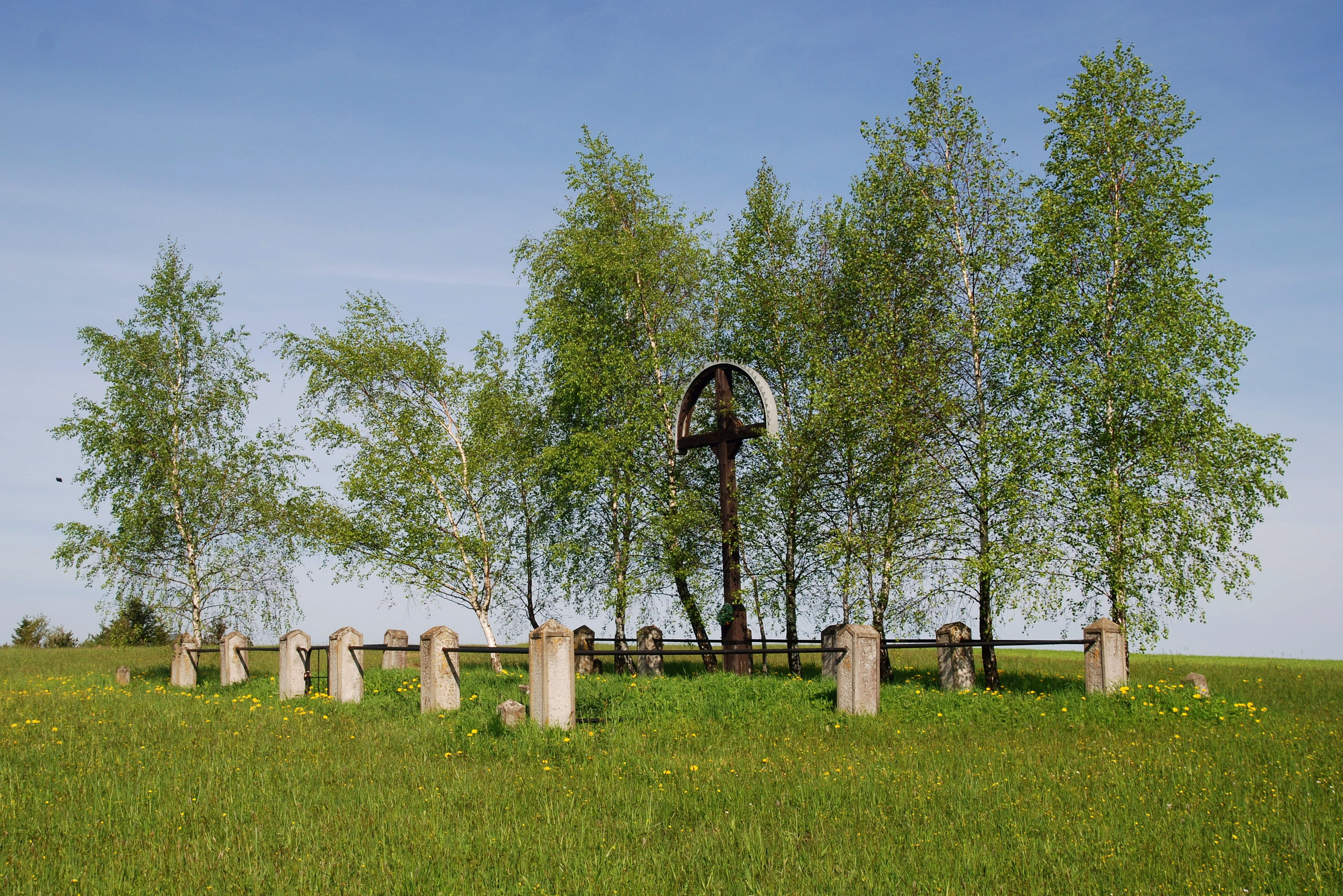
A World War I cemetery no. 128 in Wawrzka
