= Beautiful Virgin Mary from Krużlowa =

Coordinates: 49°39′06.21″N 20°53′00.58″E

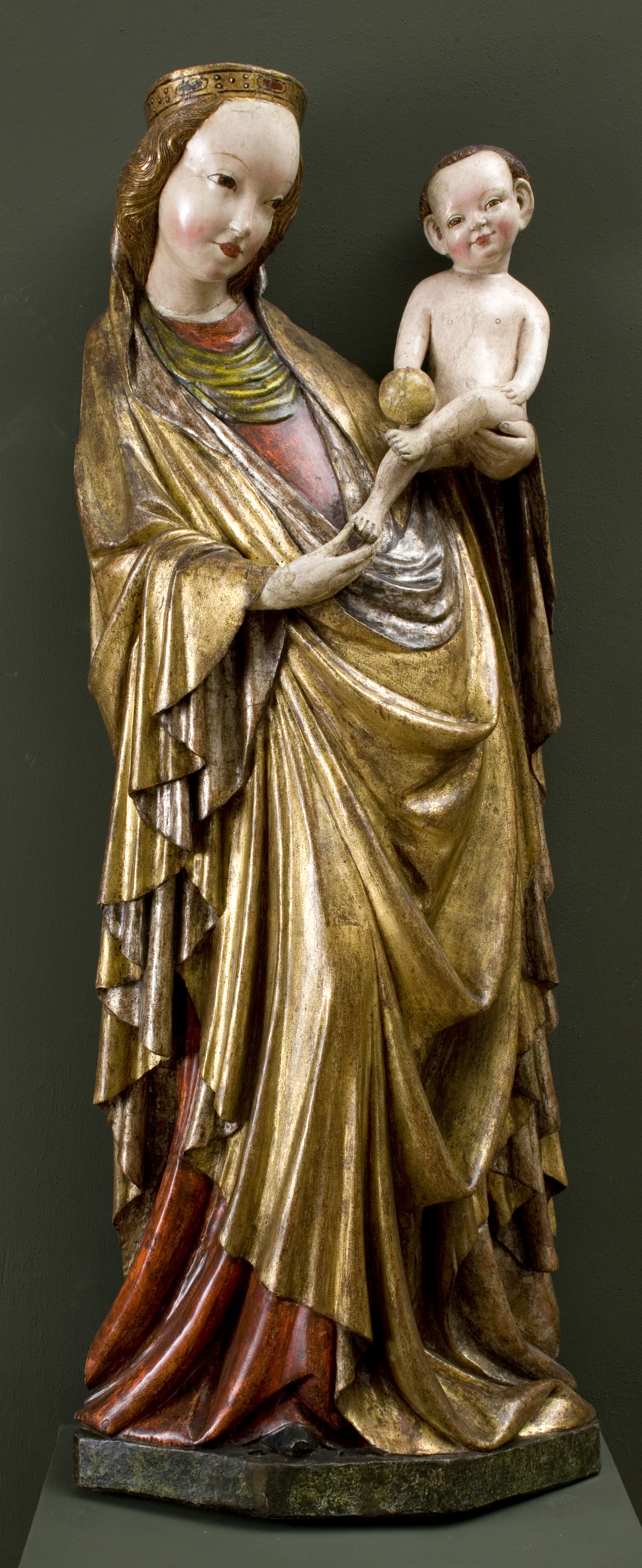
Beautiful Madonna from Krużlowa

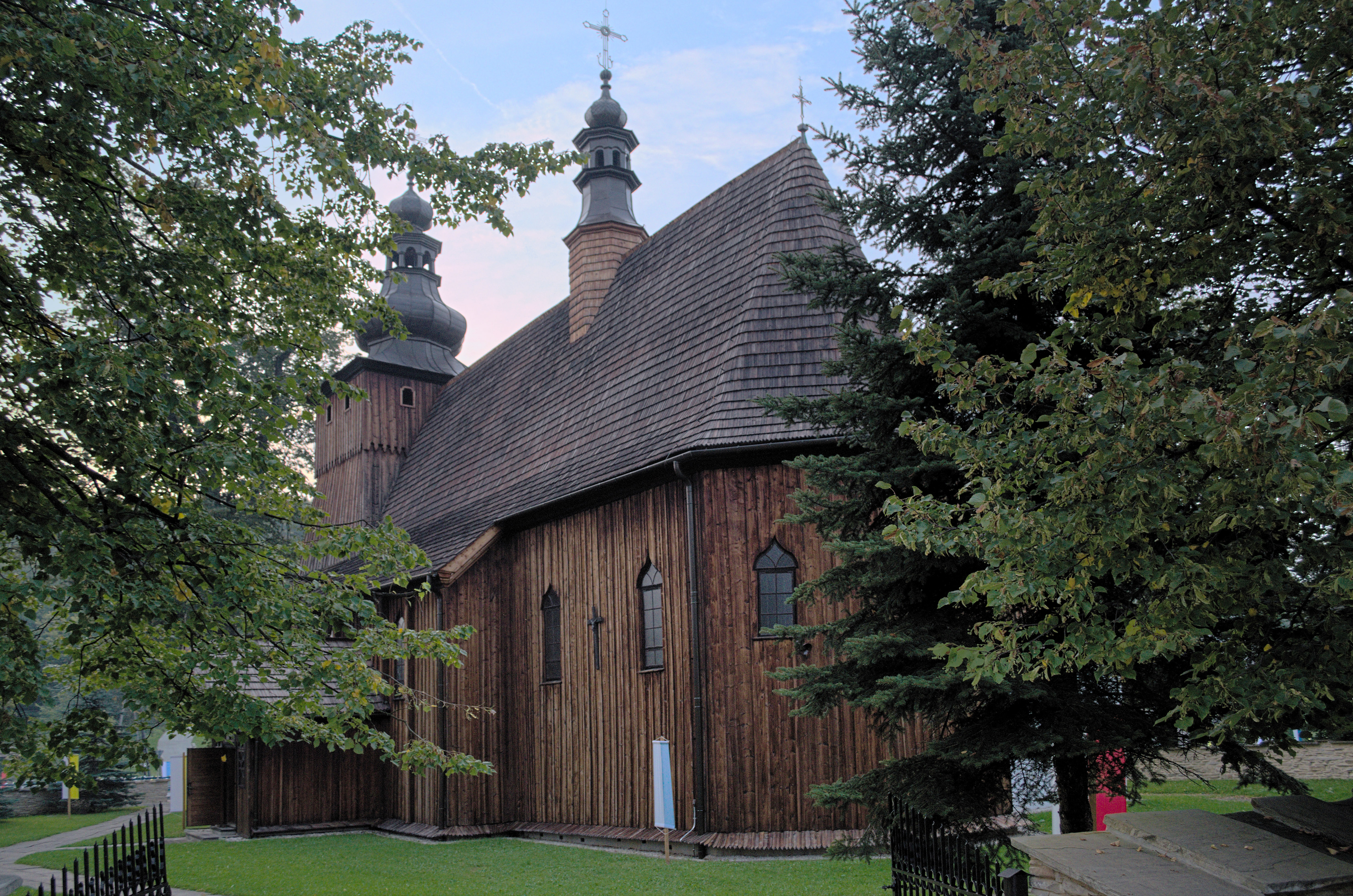
Wooden church in Krużlowa Wyżna

The Beautiful Virgin Mary from Krużlowa is a Gothic sculpture made from linden-tree timber, found 1889 in a Catholic church in Krużlowa Wyżna (Lesser Poland Voivodeship) by Władysław Łuszczkiewicz and Stanisław Wyspiański. Since 1899, the sculpture has been included in the National Museum, Kraków collections.

The sculpture belongs to the so-called soft style of International Gothic art, and it is an example of a beautiful Madonna.

== History and description ==
This sculpture was made at the beginning of the 15th century by an unknown artist. The sculpture is 119 centimetres (3 ft 11 in) high and can be viewed from three sides; the rear side is deeply hollowed to avoid cracking of the drying timber. This piece shows the Virgin Mary with a nude Baby Jesus holding an apple. The Virgin stands with an S-curve, and her clothes are richly pleated.

This sculpture was likely originally in a Kraków church, but in the 17th century it was replaced by newer Baroque sculptures and carried to the village church of Krużlowa. The first written evidence dates to 1607, the next from 1766. The sculpture was first placed on the altar of the church, but later was moved to the entrance hall, and finally, because of pest risks, was moved to the church's attic and forgotten.

The sculpture was found by the two artists in a very bad condition, coated with a three layers of oil paint, partially exposing the wooden base. The sculpture was bought by the National Museum, Kraków and exhibited in the Sukiennice Museum at Kraków Cloth Hall starting in 1924 in the City Hall tower. In 1940 the sculpture was requisitioned by the German occupation forces and was posed in the office of the Nazi governor Hans Frank at Wawel Royal Castle. Since October 2007, the sculpture has been part of the art collections of the Erasmus Ciołek Bishop's Palace, a part of the Kraków National Museum.

== Gallery ==
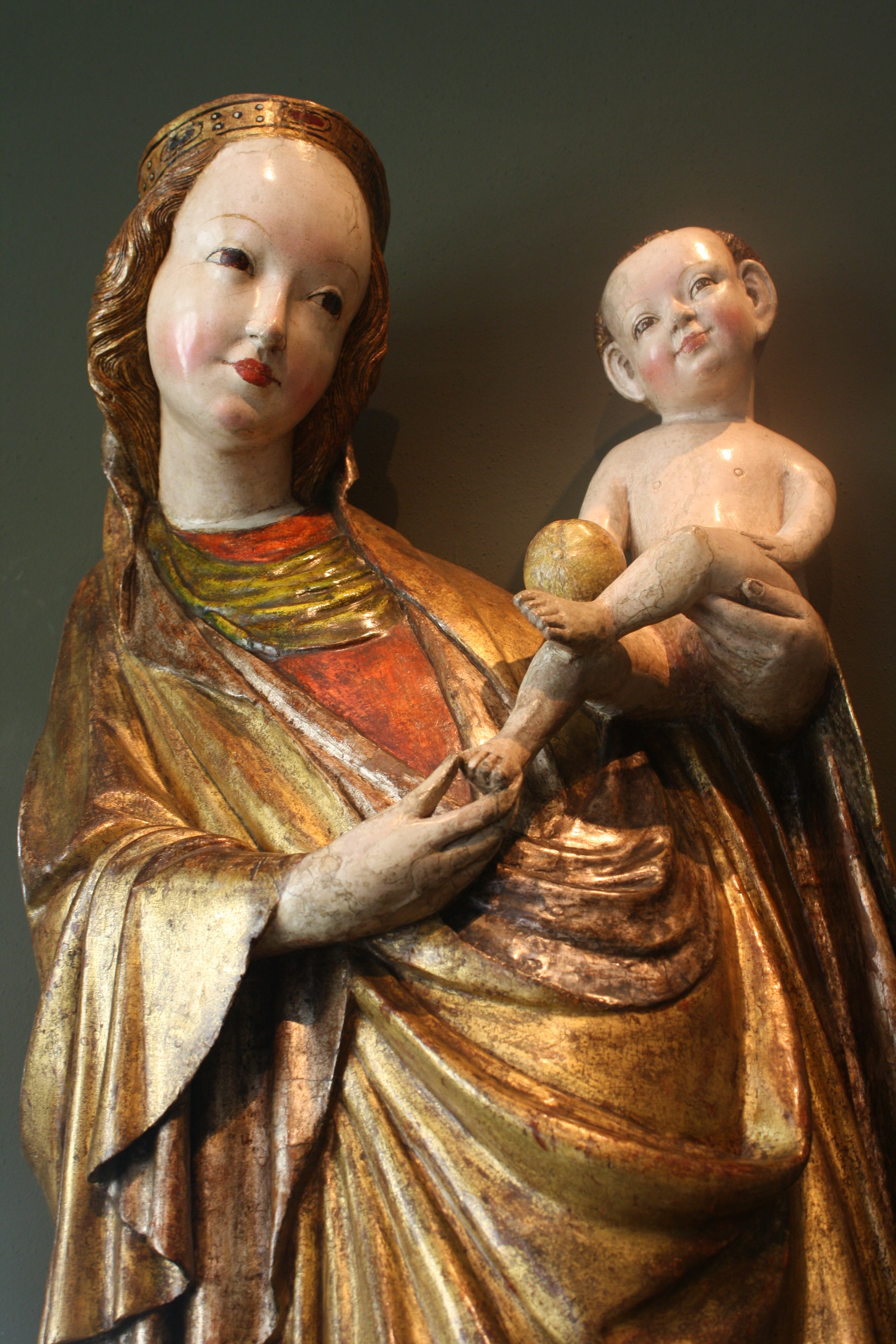

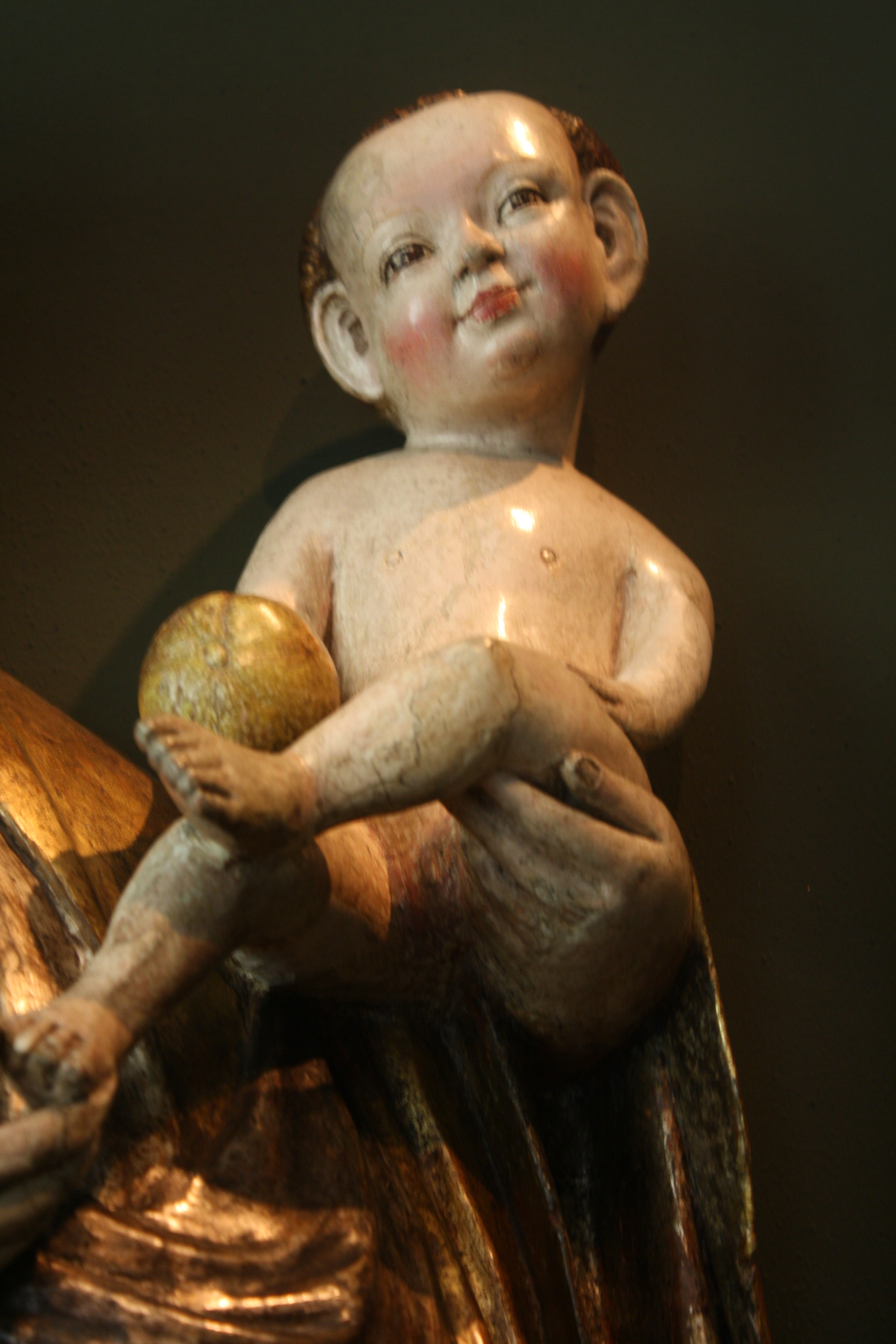

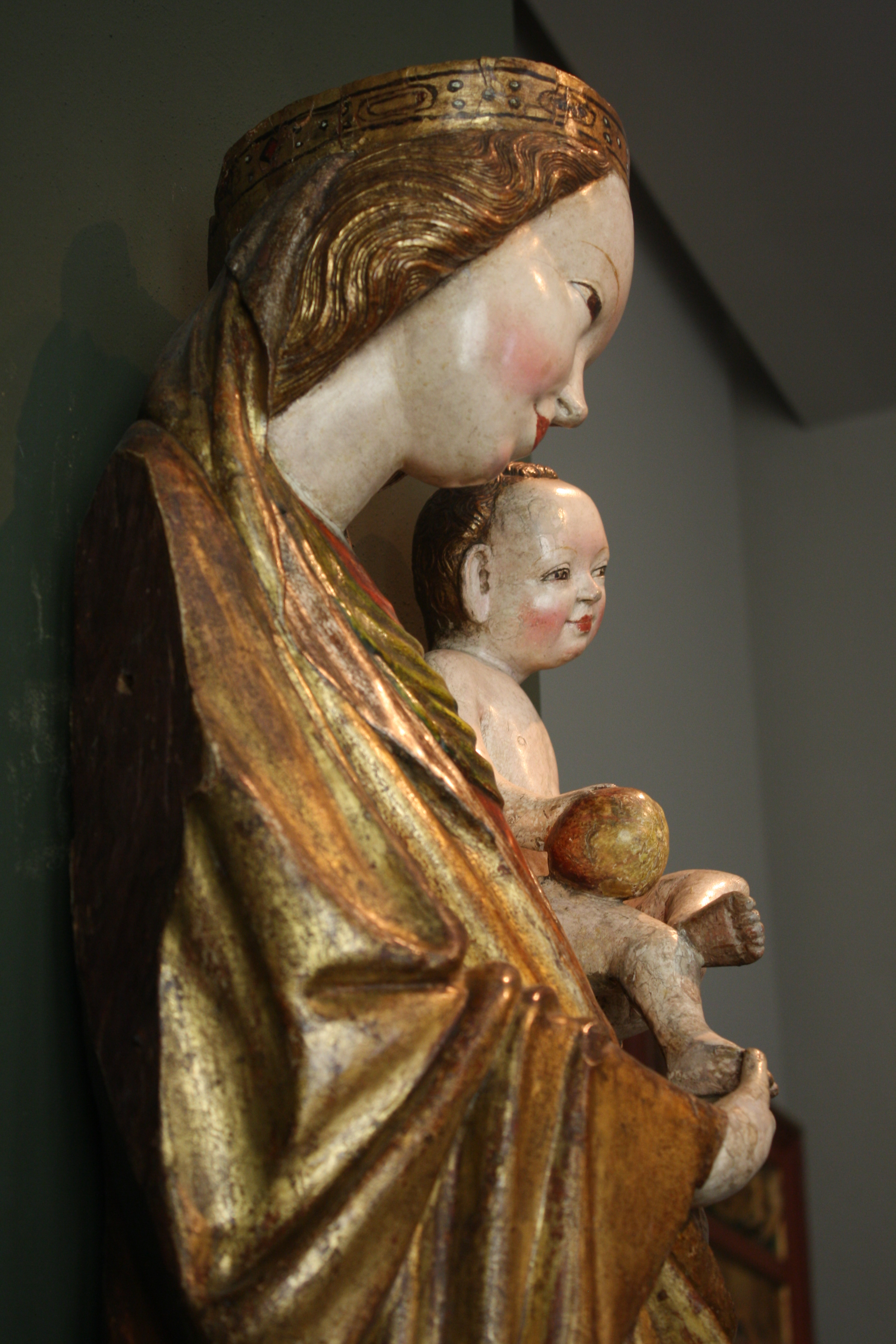
