= Maślana Góra =

Mountain in Poland

Maślana Góra (753 m a.s.l.) (pron. Mashlaana Goora, meaning in English "Butter Mountain") - mountain peak of the north-western Low Beskid mountains, located in the part called Góry Grybowskie (Eng. Grybowskie Mountains).

Maślana Góra is the highest peak of the mountain massif including also Zielona Góra (Eng. Green Mountain) and Jelenia Góra (Eng. Deer Mountain). The top of the mountain is fairly flat but the slopes of the northeastern part are quite steep. District of Maślana Góra is a home to the nature reservoir called Jelenia Góra (pron. "Yeahlenyah Goora"), and Beskidzkie Morskie Oko (pron. Beskitskyeah Morskye Oko, meaning: Sea Eye), which is a landslide pond. The etymology of the Maślana Góra is probably associated with the tectonic instability, resulting multiple landslides in the past.

The carpathian beech as well as Phyllitis scolopendrium are one of the rare plants, that are protected in this fragment of the ancient Carpathian forests.

== Tourism ==
There is a green trail leading from Stróże to Szymbark through Maślana Góra and Jelenia Góra Reservoir.
