= Biała Niżna =

- Village
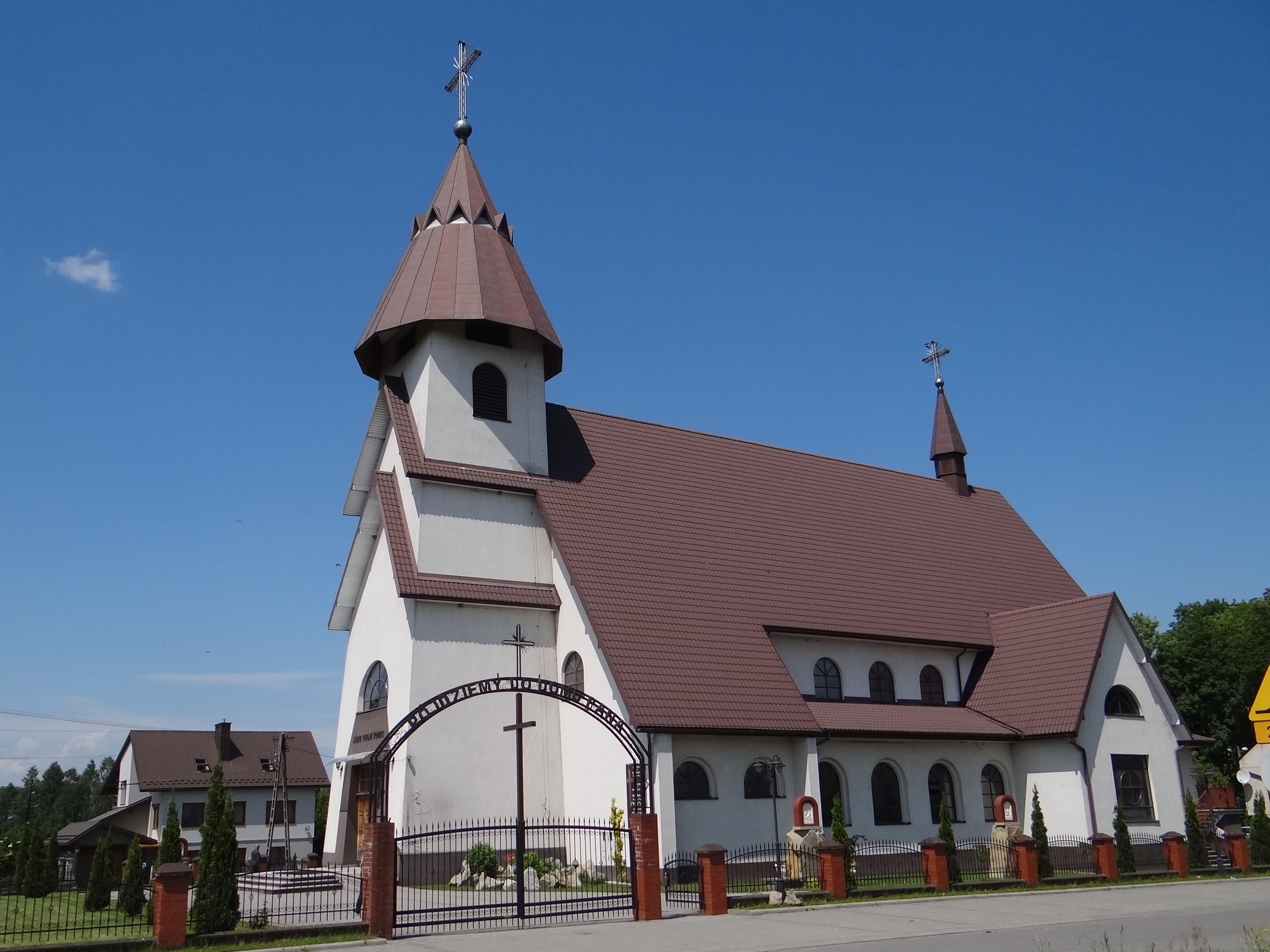
- Church in the village

- Location within Poland
- Coordinates: 49°38′N 20°59′E
- Country: Poland
- Voivodeship: Lesser Poland
- County: Nowy Sącz
- Gmina: Grybów

Population
  - Total: 2,200

Biała Niżna [ˈbʲawa ˈɲiʐna] is a village in the administrative district of Gmina Grybów, within Nowy Sącz County, Lesser Poland Voivodeship, in southern Poland.

== History ==
The nearest ghetto lay about 3 km from Biala Biała Niżna, in Grybów. It was created in 1940. The Nazis gathered about 2.500 Jews there from Krużlowa Niżna, Krużlowa Wyżna, Stara Wieś, Siołków, Mszalnica, Kąclowa, Biała Wyżna, Ptaszków but also from Lodz and its surroundings. In August 1942, the ghetto was liquidated. Some of the ghetto inmates were transported to the ghetto in Nowy Sącz and the rest of them, approximately 360 men, women and children, were executed in Biała Niżna. That's how this small village in southern Poland became one of the largest sites of martyrdom. According to Stanisław R., the witness of the shooting, among 360 Jews killed in Biała Niżna, 60 were children.
