= Kąclowa =

- Village
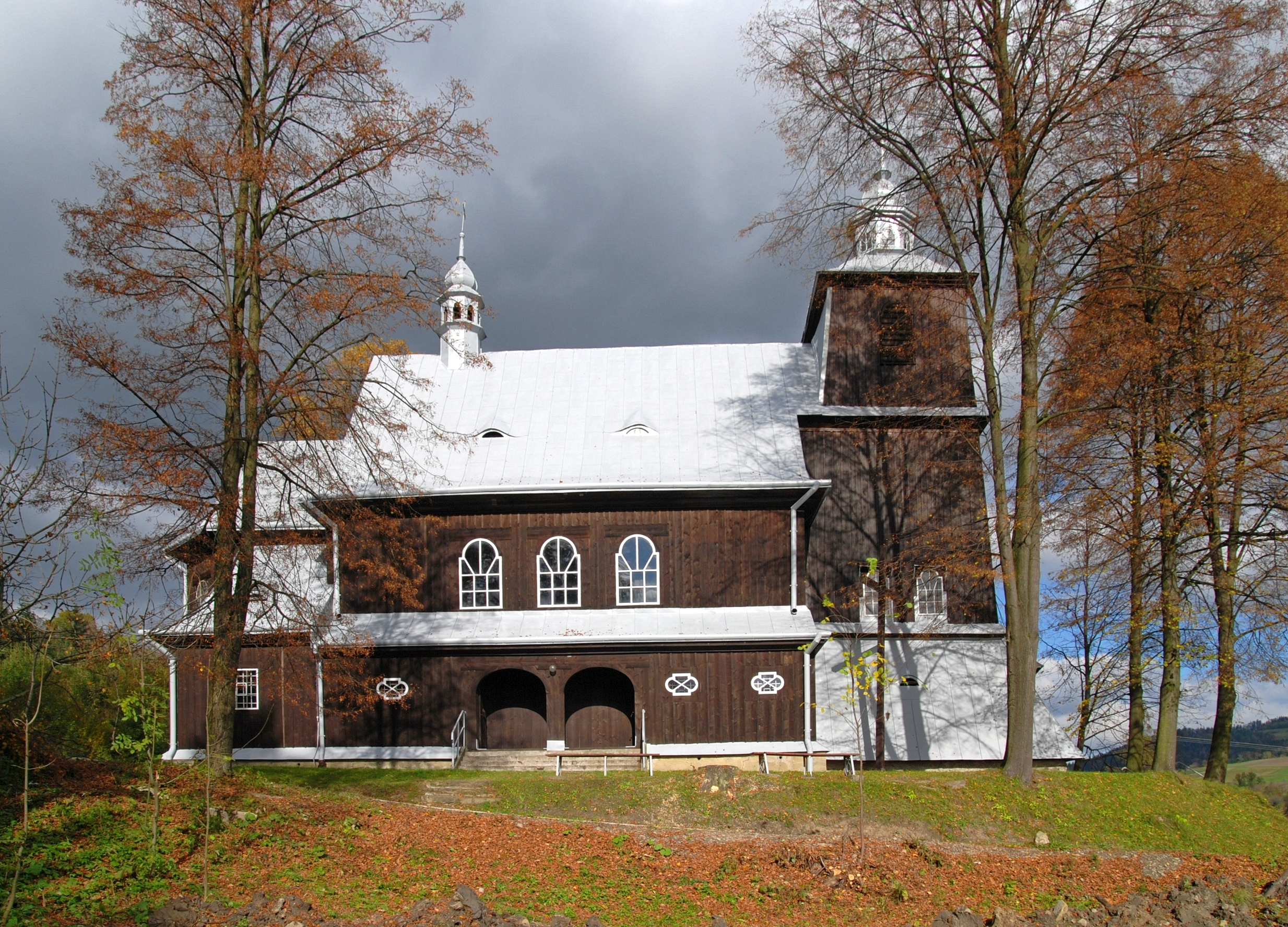
- Church of Saint Adalbert

- Location within Poland
- Coordinates: 49°35′24″N 20°57′50″E
- Country: Poland
- Voivodeship: Lesser Poland
- County: Nowy Sącz
- Gmina: Grybów

Kąclowa [kɔnt͡sˈlɔva] is a village in the administrative district of Gmina Grybów, within Nowy Sącz County, Lesser Poland Voivodeship, in southern Poland.
