= Bilsko =

Bilsko or Bílsko may refer to places:

== Czech Republic ==
- Bílsko (Olomouc District), a municipality and village in the Olomouc Region
- Bílsko (Strakonice District), a municipality and village in the South Bohemian Region
- Bílsko, a village and part of Údrnice in the Hradec Králové Region
- Bílsko u Hořic, a municipality and village in the Hradec Králové Region

== Poland ==
- Bilsko, Lesser Poland Voivodeship, a village
- Bilsko, Lublin Voivodeship, a village
