= Nowy Sącz-Łososina Dolna Airfield =

Nowy Sącz-Łososina Dolna Airfield Lotnisko Nowy Sącz-Łososina Dolna
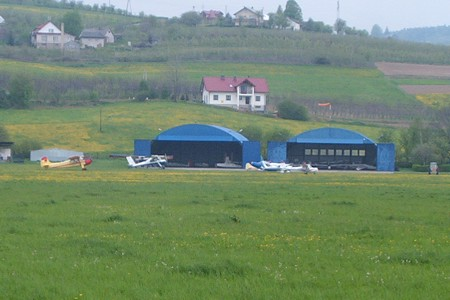
- IATA: none; ICAO: EPNL

Summary
- Owner: Aeroklub Podhalański (Podhale Flying Club)
- Location: Łososina Dolna, Poland
- Coordinates: 49°44′43″N 20°37′24″E
- Website: Page of Podhale Flying Club
- Interactive map of Nowy Sącz-Łososina Dolna Airfield

Runways
Direction	Length		Surface
Direction	ft	m	Surface
043/223	2,624	800	Grass

Nowy Sącz-Łososina Dolna Airfield - is a recreational aerodrome in Łososina Dolna near Nowy Sącz.

== Plane crash in Witowice ==
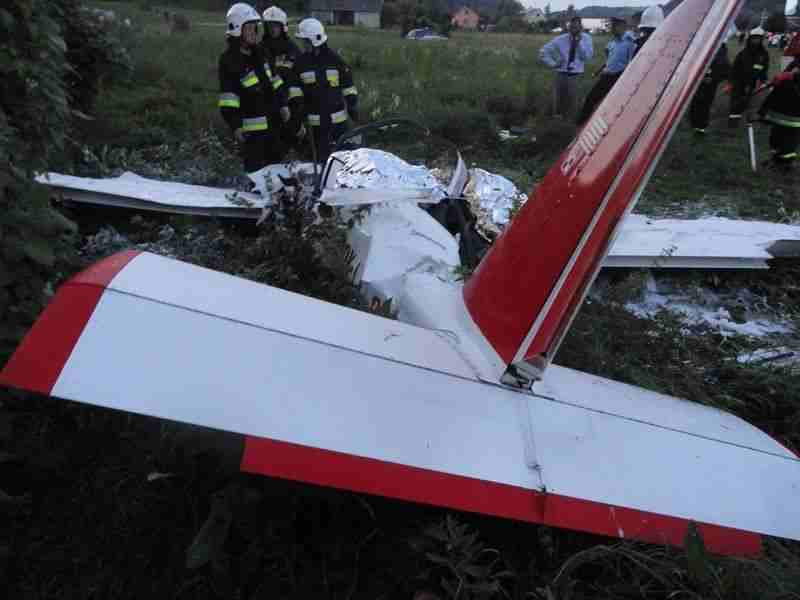
Photo of crashed plane

A plane crash occurred in Witowice Dolne on August 21, 2011. The plane was flying from airport Nowy Sącz-Łososina Dolna to airport Kraków-Pobiednik Wielki. Witowice Dolne is located about 1 km from the aerodrome. The cause is not known. Two people died.

== Bibliography ==
1. "Informacje lotniskowe AIP lotniska Łososina Dolna". Aeroklub Podhalański.
2. Katastrofa samolotu ultralekkiego pod Nowym Sączem. Polish Wikinews
