= Tęgoborze Prophecy =

The Tęgoborze Prophecy (Polish: Przepowiednia z Tęgoborza) is a verse composition, which describes the post-World War One and post-World War Two fate of Poland. Its origins date back to late 19th century, however, its author and exact date of creation have not been confirmed so far.

== Legend ==
The history of the prophecy begins in 1893 in Tęgoborze, a village located in southern Lesser Poland. The village belonged to Count Wladyslaw Wielogłowski, who was keenly interested in paranormal activities, occultism and clairvoyance. Wielogłowski frequently invited there various fortune tellers and other persons who claimed magical abilities.

On September 23 of that year, a mysterious woman appeared in Wielogłowski's house. She stated she was a medium and offered to foresee future. Apparently, she got into touch with a ghost, which left her a message concerning Poland's fate. Wielogłowski, who was present during the session, wrote everything in his diary.

A few years later, after the Count's death, the house was inherited by his relative Aleksander Wielogłowski, who decided to remodel the complex and found an archive, with words of the prophecy. Since he was not interested in it, he decided to hand it to the Ossolineum library in Lwow, where it was carefully stored as the Tęgoborze Prophecy.

== Publication ==
At first, the composition did not raise interest and was not taken seriously. In 1912, the Gazeta Narodowa newspaper published it, together with a Russian translation. In the following years, the prophecy was forgotten, but this changed on March 27, 1939, a few months before the German and Soviet invasion of Poland. The popular Ilustrowany Kurier Codzienny daily published the text, together with an article about its history. Thousands of readers got to know the composition, and it became extremely popular during the war, when Poland was occupied by the two powers - Nazi Germany and the Soviet Union. It raised the spirits of the oppressed Poles, giving them hope for a better future of their homeland.

The current whereabouts of the original text of the prophecy are not known. It was lost during the war and has not been found.

== Authorship ==
The name of the author of the prophecy is not known. In the Ilustrowany Kurier Codzienny, it was signed from an anonymous medium, while the 1912 Gazeta Narodowa wrote that it was written by a ghost of Adam Mickiewicz, which appeared in the house of Count Wielogłowski in 1893.

In his book Through the Windows of Time: The Clairvoyant of Wisła, Polish journalist and composer Stanisław Hadyna named Agnieszka Pilchowa, a popular interbellum period clairvoyant, as the author., and this presumed linkage is re-stated in a 2014 scholarly article about Pilchowa.
