= Wronowice =

Wronowice may refer to the following places:

- Wronowice, Lesser Poland Voivodeship (south Poland)
- Wronowice, Łódź Voivodeship (central Poland)
- Wronowice, Lublin Voivodeship (east Poland)
