= Świdnik (disambiguation) =

Świdnik is a town in Lublin Voivodeship, east Poland.

Świdnik may also refer to:

- Świdnik County, Lublin Voivodeship
- Świdnik, Lower Silesian Voivodeship a village (south-west Poland)
- Świdnik, Limanowa County in Lesser Poland Voivodeship (south Poland)
- Świdnik, Nowy Sącz County in Lesser Poland Voivodeship (south Poland)

== See also ==
- Svidník, a town in eastern Slovakia
- Svidník District, Slovakia
- Świdnica, Lower Silesian Voivodeship, a city in south-west Poland
- Świdnica County, Lower Silesian Voivodeship
- Świdnica, Lubusz Voivodeship, a village
