= Tęgoborze Palace =

Coordinates: 49.7085°N 20.6391°E

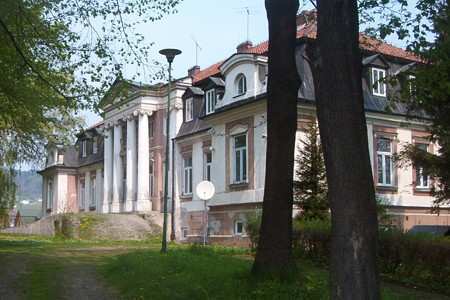

The Palace of Tęgoborze (Polish: Dwór w Tębogorzu) is a classical, one-storeyed, marble mansion-house from the 18th century. It is in Tęgoborze – a village in southern Poland (Gmina Łososina Dolna), 11 km from Nowy Sącz. The first owner was Count Dunikowski. It's said that count's wife has been walled up alive there and her spirit, called the White Lady, is still appearing there. After Dunikowski's family's death, the owner was Count Wielogłowski, who was a spirit rapper. In this time, there were a lot of spiritualist sessions in the octagonal room in the palace.

On one session dated on 23 September 1893, spirits had said what would happen in the future. The words has become a sensation after being published in 1939 in the biggest Polish newspaper Ilustrowany Kurier Codzienny. The so-called Tęgoborze Prophecy tells of a 2nd world war or a Polish pope.

For a long time the owner of the mansion house was the Cracovian company Telpod but since 1999 it has been a private property.
