= Agnieszka Pilchowa =

Polish clairvoyant

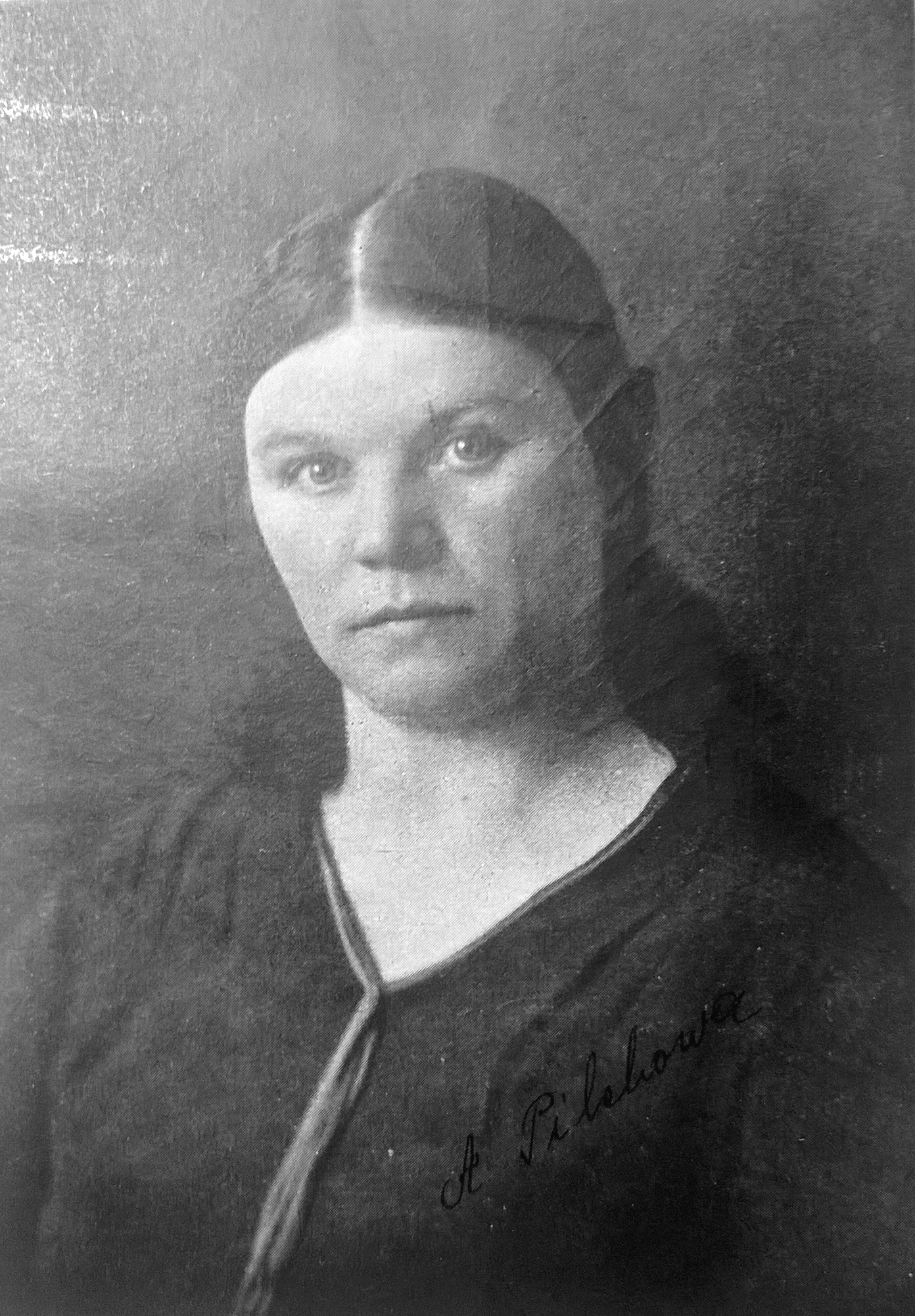
- Born: 16 December 1888; Slezská Ostrava, Austria-Hungary
- Died: 21 November 1944 (aged 55); Ravensbrück, Nazi Germany
- Occupations: Clairvoyant and writer
- Writing career
- Language: Polish

Agnieszka Pilchowa (pseudonym Agni P., 16 December 1888 – 21 November 1944) was a Polish herbalist who claimed to be a clairvoyant. Her supposed ability to see events before they happened was observed in many different places and under many different circumstances.

== Early life ==
Pilchowa was born on 16 December 1888 in Slezská Ostrava, Austria-Hungary (present-day Czech Republic). She was ethnically Polish, although her family spoke Czech at home and she went to a Czech-language school. Her purported supernatural abilities were visible from early years. As a child, she frequently broke into an unusual state in which she claimed to see exotic places, faraway countries and never-before-seen people. When in this state, she did not react to external impulses. Her siblings would stop playing with her, and Pilchowa withdrew into herself, happily spending her time outside. As she later wrote:

I had been born a clairvoyant. Whenever I am supposed to look into the world of the spirit, I do not need to fall into a trance. I do not need to use any medications; at first, I had to close my eyes. Now, I do not even have to do this.

When Pilchowa was a child, her mother remarried. The stepfather hated her so much that he would order the girl to do the most demanding chores on the family farm. She was always obedient and humble; as a child, she wanted to become a nun. Pilchowa would often find herself near a local convent, but at the age of 18, she changed her mind and joined the Spiritist Society of Cieszyn Silesia. However, other members of the Society, seeing the ease with which she managed to get into a trance, came to the conclusion that Pilchowa was a cheat. After several heated arguments, the young woman left the organization.

== Life in the interbellum ==
In her late teens, Pilchowa married a local man. The post-World War I political situation made her life complicated. As an ethnic Pole, she was forced by the authorities of Czechoslovakia to leave her village and move to the Second Polish Republic, and her property was confiscated. In the late 1910s she divorced her husband, citing rape as one of the reasons.

Pilchowa settled in the town of Wisła, but in 1919 she returned to Czechoslovakia and went to Prague, where she took part in a series of scientific experiments at the University of Prague. Her alleged powers of precognition, ability to see events before they happened, was officially confirmed. President Tomas Masaryk and his daughter Alicia were so impressed with her that he asked her to stay in Prague and work for him, but she refused and returned to Wisła. Now with a new husband, Jan, and their two children, Agnieszka settled in a house in Wisła. She claimed that it was her guardian angel that had told her to live in this town, an that the angel had found her a spot on a hill in Wisła, where in 1931 the Pilch family completed a spacious villa called “Sfinks” (Sphinx). The name was a gesture to Julian Ochorowicz, who lived nearby. The house also was the main office of the monthly Hejnal Spiritual Knowledge, where several people came asking for advice. After World War II, it was turned into a popular rest home.

Moving to Poland was not easy for Pilchowa, who spoke limited Polish and had little knowledge of Polish culture. As those who knew her later recalled, even after several years she spoke "a weird, outdated Polish, based on 19th-century authors such as Andrzej Towianski".

In the 1920s Pilchowa became famous across southwestern Poland. She was not only a supposed clairvoyant but also a herbalist and a healer. She would prescribe herbs and diet to her patients, frequently using her so-called paranormal skills to apparently look into patients’ past events. She liked to sing religious songs, and in her diary Pilchowa wrote that while examining patients, she felt their pain physically. Her patients came mostly from Upper Silesia, Trans-Olza and Podhale. Among the people she treated there were Michal Grazynski, voivode of the Autonomous Silesian Voivodeship as well as President Ignacy Mościcki and Józef Piłsudski. Agnes (or Agni P.), as she came to be known, shared her visions with Piłsudski; she was also invited to Belweder several times.

In the 1930s, Pilchowa became famous across Poland. Her name was frequently mentioned on Polish Radio, mostly due to the broadcasts and articles of Zofia Kossak-Szczucka, who lived in the nearby village of Górki Wielkie. Pilchowa's prophecies were widely known and discussed, with the most famous one, the Tegoborze Prophecy, published on 27 March 1939, in Ilustrowany Kurier Codzienny daily. The publisher claimed that the Tegoborze Prophecy came from 23 September 1893, but Polish journalist and composer Stanisław Hadyna in his book Through the windows of time (Polish title: Przez okna czasu) named Pilchowa as the author. The prophecy, which supposedly foresaw the outbreak of World War I and II:

In twenty years there will come dozens of times
When fire will pour forth from the sky.
Then meet Wernyhora songs,
The whole world is choking with blood.

(..)

When the black eagle sign of the filthy cross,
The wings spread across a sinister,
The two countries will fall, which no one saves,
Strength is still against the law.

But the black eagle will come to a crossroads;
When one turns one's eyes to the east,
The Teutons spreading their customs
With a broken wing back.

as well as Polish Pope:

The three rivers of the world will give three crowns
Anointed from Kraków,
Four on the outskirts of the allied parties
Vow to supply his words.

was a sensation, mentioned multiple times in several sources as well as movies such as Leonard Buczkowski's film Forbidden songs (1946).

== World War II and death ==
Pilchowa's numerous activities were terminated in September 1939 after the joint Nazi and Soviet attack on Poland. Her prophecies became influenced by the horrific wartime reality and her visions were misunderstood by many, since they were regarded as too extravagant. In one session, she apparently foresaw the outbreak of the war and also talked about Hitler's attack on the Soviet Union. Since she mentioned it in late 1939 or early 1940, when the two powers were allied (see: Molotov–Ribbentrop Pact), those present protested. In response, Pilchowa said: "I am just describing what I see."

During the same session, she claimed to see a group of soldiers at the Brandenburg Gate, then a topographic map with miniature American and Japanese flags. Stanisław Hadyna, a witness at the session, then asked: "What are you talking about? Are you saying that the Japanese-American war will finish the Polish-German war? This is absurd." Pilchowa did not answer and kept on talking: "I do not understand what it is. I see something terrible. It is a giant mushroom, made of clouds, which is growing in the skies. Where is it? What is it?" Then she opened her eyes wide and said that it was impossible: "It will result in the death of the planet," she added.

In another 1940 vision, Pilchowa said: "I see large countries filled with hatred and violence, confined with barbed wire. I see burning bodies, the smoke of hellish fires covers the sky. I see a swastika rolling eastwards that wants to crush the country of the pentagram in vindictive satisfaction. The two criminals of humanity will fight each other using hordes of their slaves and masses of their weapons. The ground will shake under their steps."

At the beginning of 1940, Stanisław Hadyna met her for the last time, asking what would happen to the world. As he wrote in his book, Pilchowa began weeping and shaking, then she said in a quiet voice: "This all is horrible. They are burning people in furnaces. Thousands of people, whole trainloads. They are chased across the forests and snow, behind barbed wires of camps. They are shooting. Pits filled with dead bodies."

Pilchowa died on 4 January 1945 in the Ravensbrück concentration camp. She was arrested by the SS and was shot.
