= Záluží =

Záluží may refer to places in the Czech Republic:

- Záluží (Beroun District), a municipality and village in the Central Bohemian Region
- Záluží (Litoměřice District), a municipality and village in the Ústí nad Labem Region
- Záluží, a village and part of Bílsko (Strakonice District) in the South Bohemian Region
- Záluží, a village and part of Čelákovice in the Central Bohemian Region
- Záluží, a village and part of Chyšky in the South Bohemian Region
- Záluží, a village and part of Dolní Třebonín in the South Bohemian Region
- Záluží, a village and part of Kotovice in the Plzeň Region
- Záluží, a village and part of Kovářov in the South Bohemian Region
- Záluží, a village and part of Litvínov in the Ústí nad Labem Region
- Záluží, a village and part of Přídolí in the South Bohemian Region
- Záluží, a village and part of Slavče in the South Bohemian Region
- Záluží, a village and part of Spálené Poříčí in the Plzeň Region
- Záluží, a village and part of Sušice in the Plzeň Region
- Záluží, a village and part of Tábor in the South Bohemian Region
- Záluží, a village and part of Třemošná in the Plzeň Region
- Záluží, a village and part of Vlastiboř (Tábor District) in the South Bohemian Region
- Záluží u Budislavě, a village and part of Budislav (Tábor District) in the South Bohemian Region
