= Bilski =

Bilski (feminine: Bilska) is a Polish toponymic surname derived from one of places named Bilsko. It may also be derived from "Bielski". Notable people with the surname include:

- Arkadiusz Bilski (born 1973), Polish football manager and former player
- Benjamin Bilski (born 1988), German former professional swimmer
- Bernard L. Bilski, lead petitioner in the 2010 U.S. Supreme Court case Bilski v. Kappos and appellant its 2008 Federal Circuit predecessor case In re Bilski
- Olha Bilska, birth name of Olha Petliura (1885–1959), spouse of Ukrainian political leader Symon Petliura
