= Stańkowa, Lesser Poland Voivodeship =

Stańkowa
- Village
- Location within Poland
- Coordinates: 49°43′N 20°33′E
- Country: Poland
- Voivodeship: Lesser Poland
- County: Nowy Sącz
- Gmina: Łososina Dolna

Stańkowa [staɲˈkɔva] is a village in the administrative district of Gmina Łososina Dolna, within Nowy Sącz County, Lesser Poland Voivodeship, in southern Poland.
