= Białawoda, Lesser Poland Voivodeship =

Białawoda
- Village
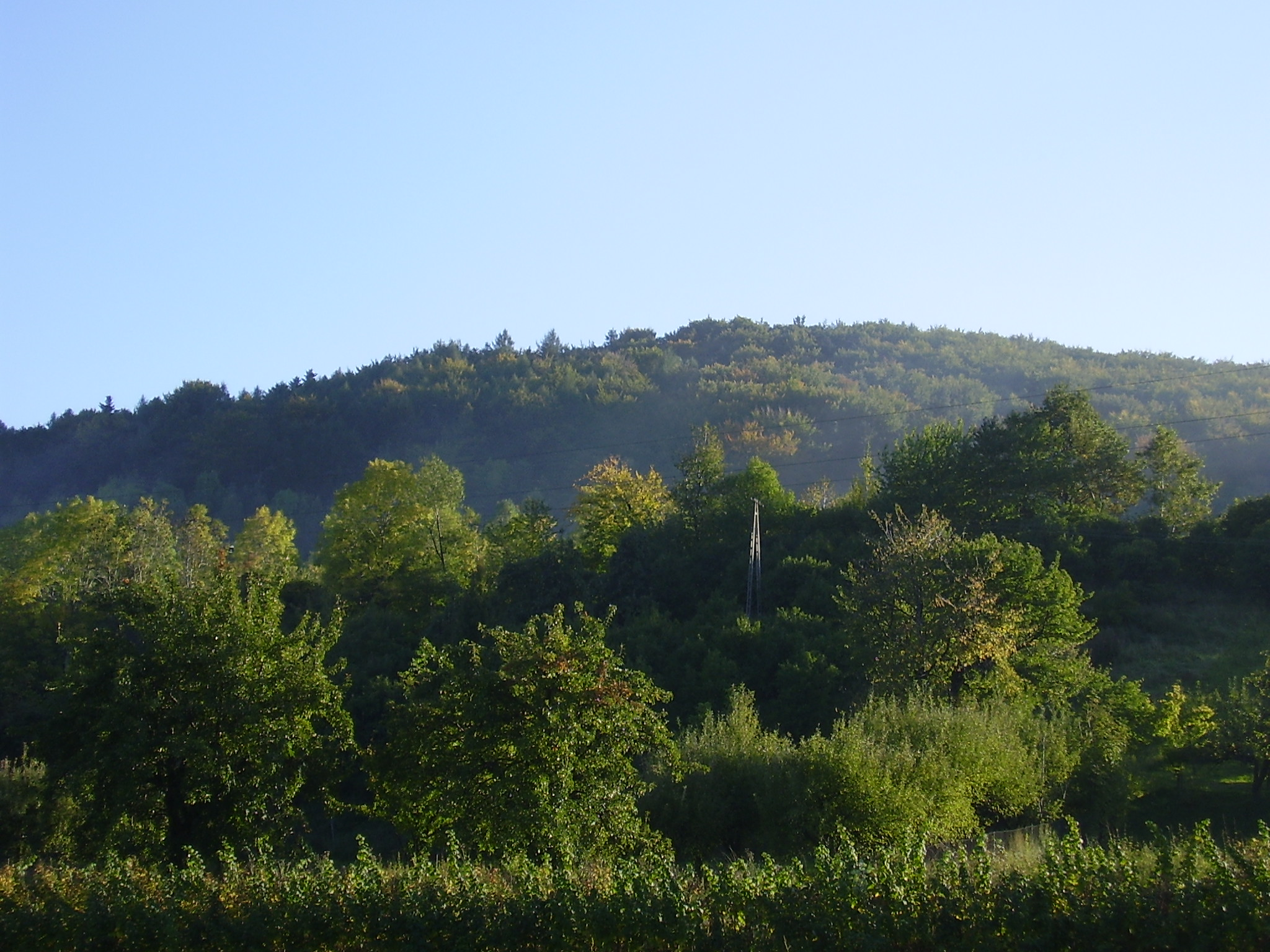

- Location within Poland
- Coordinates: 49°41′N 20°38′E
- Country: Poland
- Voivodeship: Lesser Poland
- County: Nowy Sącz
- Gmina: Łososina Dolna

Białawoda [bʲawaˈvɔda] is a village in the administrative district of Gmina Łososina Dolna, within Nowy Sącz County, Lesser Poland Voivodeship, in southern Poland.
