= Zawadka, Nowy Sącz County =

Zawadka
- Village
- Location within Poland
- Coordinates: 49°41′25″N 20°36′19″E
- Country: Poland
- Voivodeship: Lesser Poland
- County: Nowy Sącz
- Gmina: Łososina Dolna

Zawadka [zaˈvatka] is a village in the administrative district of Gmina Łososina Dolna, within Nowy Sącz County, Lesser Poland Voivodeship, in southern Poland.
