= Rąbkowa =

- Village
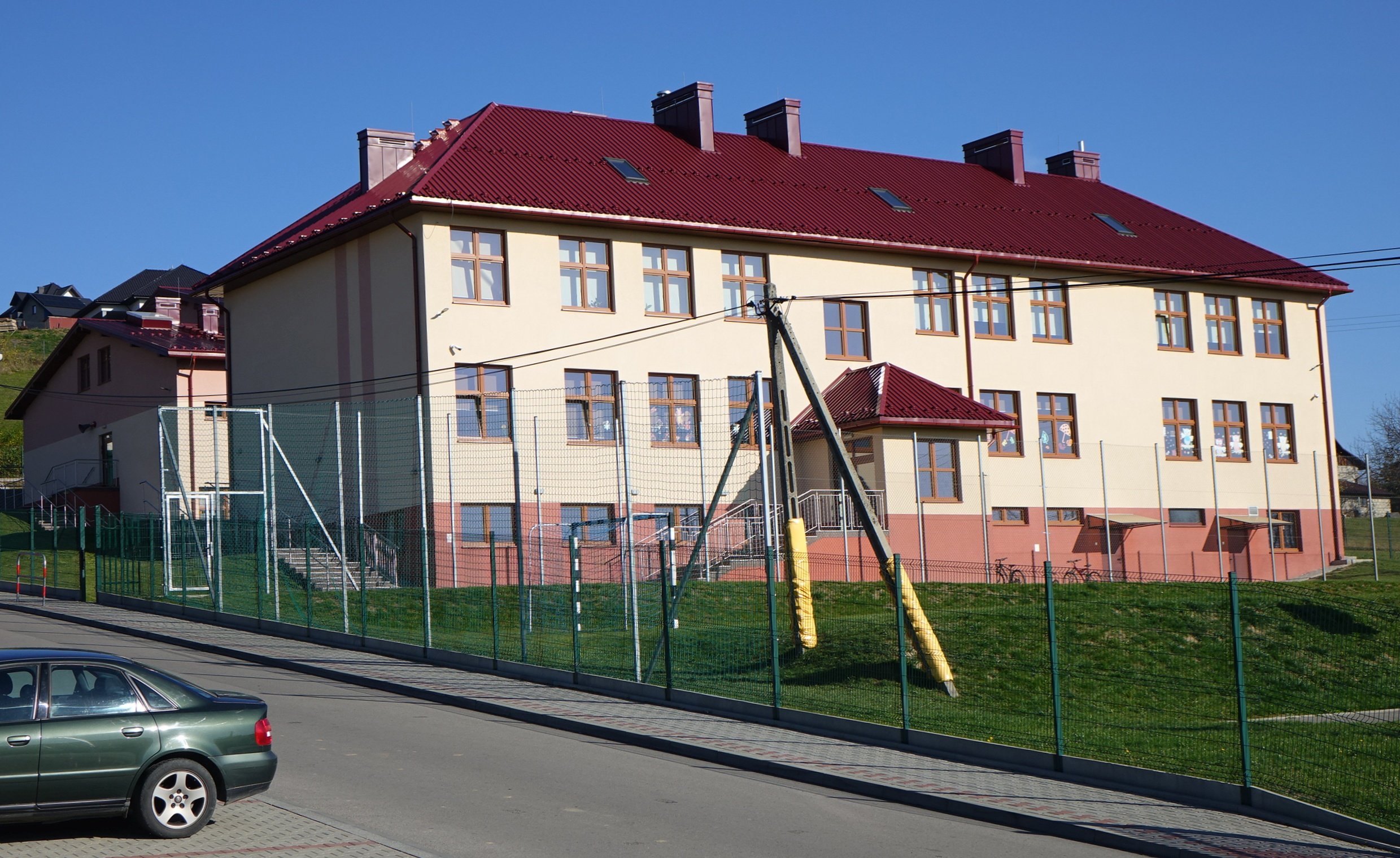
- School

- Location within Poland
- Coordinates: 49°44′N 20°39′E
- Country: Poland
- Voivodeship: Lesser Poland
- County: Nowy Sącz
- Gmina: Łososina Dolna

Rąbkowa [rɔmpˈkɔva] is a village in the administrative district of Gmina Łososina Dolna, within Nowy Sącz County, Lesser Poland Voivodeship, in southern Poland.
