= Gmina Łososina Dolna =

Gmina Łososina Dolna Łososina Dolna Commune
- Gmina
- Flag Coat of arms
- Interactive map of Gmina Łososina Dolna
- Coordinates (Łososina Dolna): 49°44′52″N 20°37′52″E
- Country: Poland
- Voivodeship: Lesser Poland
- County: Nowy Sącz County
- Seat: Łososina Dolna sus

Area
  - Total: 84.31 km^{2} (32.55 sq mi)

Population (2006)
  - Total: 9,814
  - Density: 116.4/km^{2} (301.5/sq mi)
- Website: http://www.lososina.pl

Gmina Łososina Dolna is a rural gmina (administrative district) in Nowy Sącz County, Lesser Poland Voivodeship, in southern Poland. Its seat is the village of Łososina Dolna, which lies approximately 15 kilometres (9 mi) north of Nowy Sącz and 81 km (50 mi) south-east of the regional capital Kraków.

The gmina covers an area of 84.31 square kilometres (32.6 sq mi), and as of 2006 its total population is 9,814.

== Villages ==
Gmina Łososina Dolna contains the villages and settlements of Białawoda, Bilsko, Łęki, Łososina Dolna, Łyczanka, Michalczowa, Rąbkowa, Skrzętla-Rojówka, Stańkowa, Świdnik, Tabaszowa, Tęgoborze, Witowice Dolne, Witowice Górne, Wronowice, Zawadka, Żbikowice and Znamirowice.

== Neighbouring gminas ==
Gmina Łososina Dolna is bordered by the gminas of Chełmiec, Czchów, Gródek nad Dunajcem, Iwkowa, Laskowa and Limanowa.
