= Údrnice =

- Municipality
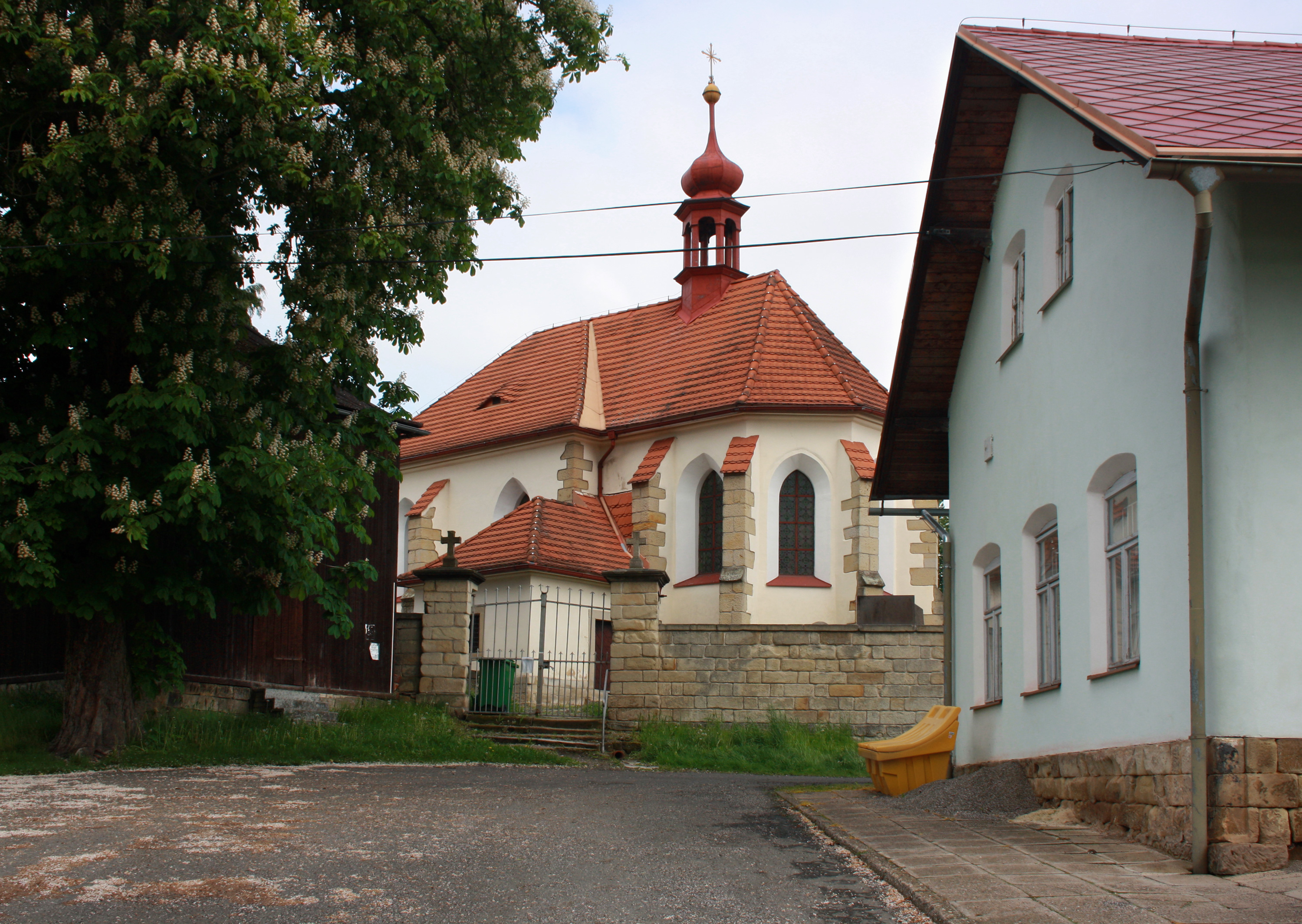
- Church of Saint Martin

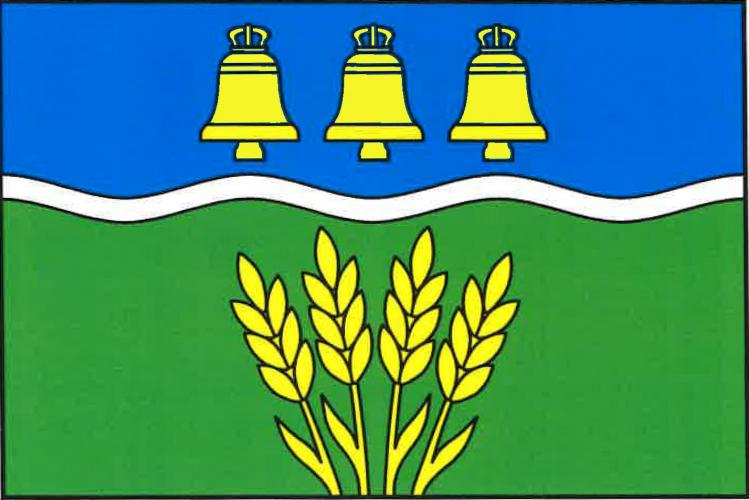
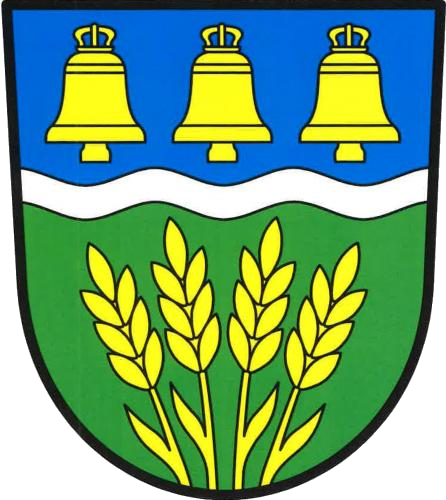
- Flag Coat of arms

- Location in the Czech Republic
- Coordinates: 50°22′28″N 15°15′42″E
- Country: Czech Republic
- Region: Hradec Králové
- District: Jičín
- First mentioned: 1318

Area
  - Total: 9.25 km^{2} (3.57 sq mi)
- Elevation: 269 m (883 ft)

Population (2026-01-01)
  - Total: 332
  - Density: 35.9/km^{2} (93.0/sq mi)
- Time zone: UTC+1 (CET)
  - Summer (DST): UTC+2 (CEST)
- Postal codes: 507 23, 507 32
- Website: www.udrnice.cz

Údrnice is a municipality and village in Jičín District in the Hradec Králové Region of the Czech Republic. It has about 300 inhabitants.

== Administrative division ==
Údrnice consists of three municipal parts (in brackets population according to the 2021 census):

- Údrnice (169)
- Bílsko (78)
- Únětice (74)

== Demographics ==
Historical population
Year	Pop.	±%
1869	982	—
1880	1,044	+6.3%
1890	1,079	+3.4%
1900	1,074	−0.5%
1910	1,009	−6.1%
1921	952	−5.6%
1930	893	−6.2%
1950	581	−34.9%
1961	494	−15.0%
1970	394	−20.2%
1980	357	−9.4%
1991	287	−19.6%
2001	276	−3.8%
2011	287	+4.0%
2021	321	+11.8%
Source: Censuses
