= Łososina Dolna =

- Village
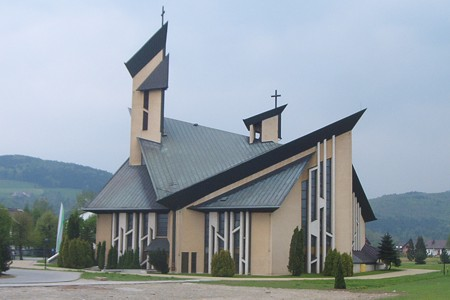
- Church of Saints Peter and Paul

- Location within Poland
- Coordinates: 49°44′52″N 20°37′52″E
- Country: Poland
- Voivodeship: Lesser Poland
- County: Nowy Sącz
- Gmina: Łososina Dolna

Population
  - Total: 1,650

Łososina Dolna [wɔsɔˈɕina ˈdɔlna] is a village in Nowy Sącz County, Lesser Poland Voivodeship, in southern Poland. It is the seat of the gmina (administrative district) called Gmina Łososina Dolna.
