= Witowice Dolne =

- Village
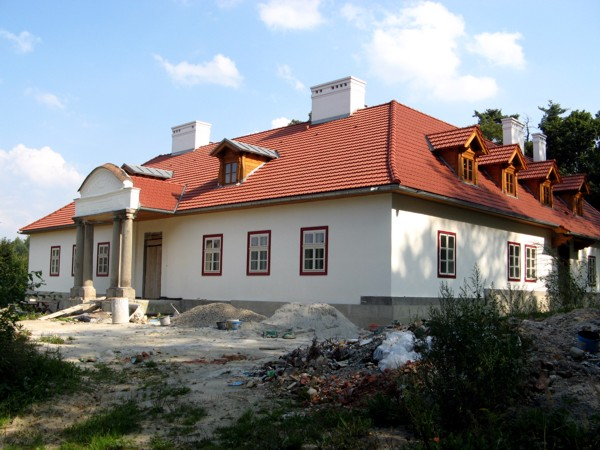
- Manor house

- Location within Poland
- Coordinates: 49°47′N 20°40′E
- Country: Poland
- Voivodeship: Lesser Poland
- County: Nowy Sącz
- Gmina: Łososina Dolna
- Population: 450

Witowice Dolne [vʲitɔˈvʲit͡sɛ ˈdɔlnɛ] is a village in the administrative district of Gmina Łososina Dolna, within Nowy Sącz County, Lesser Poland Voivodeship, in southern Poland.
