= Świdnik, Nowy Sącz County =

Świdnik
- Village
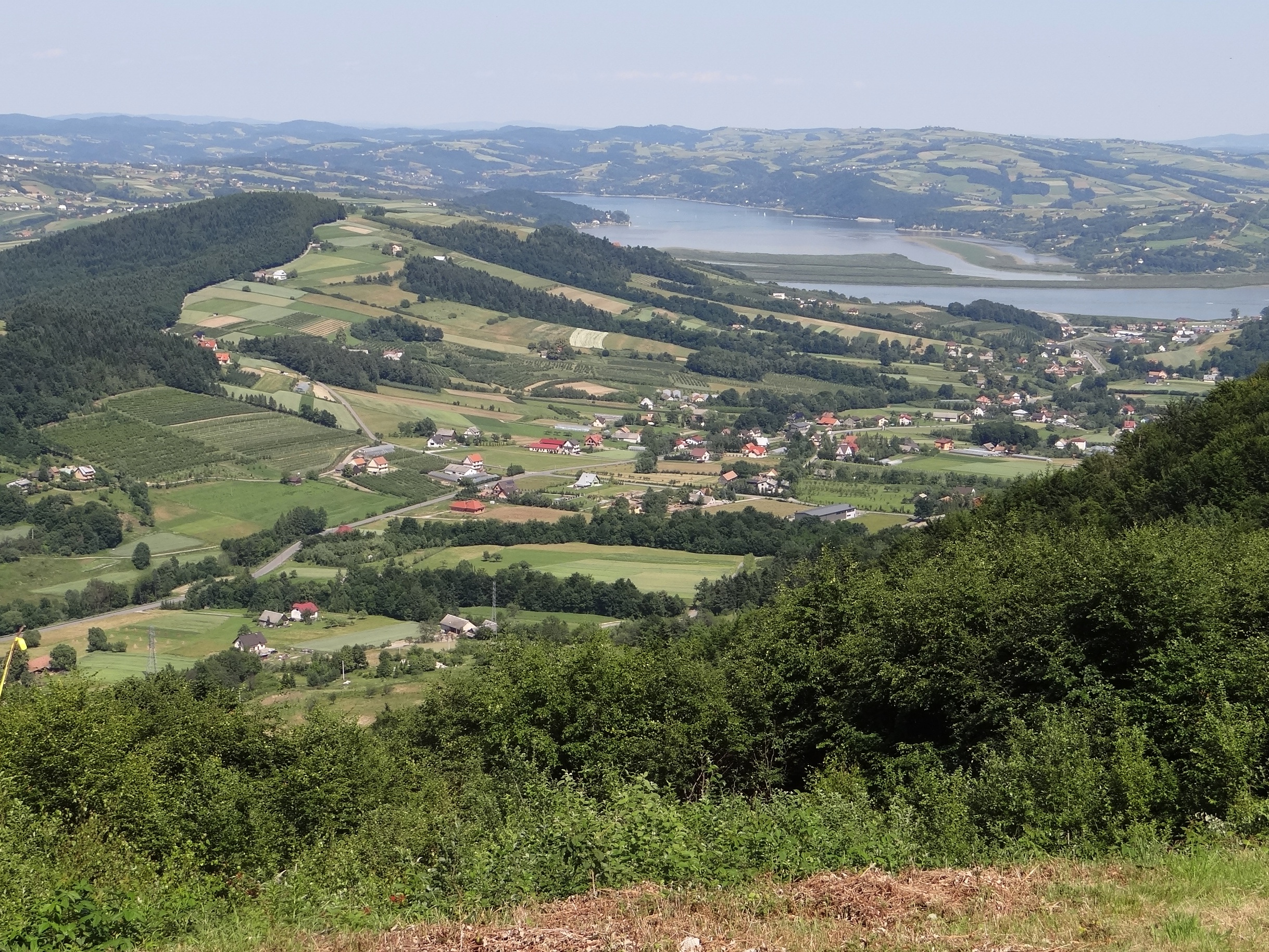

- Location within Poland
- Coordinates: 49°43′N 20°36′E
- Country: Poland
- Voivodeship: Lesser Poland
- County: Nowy Sącz
- Gmina: Łososina Dolna

Świdnik (Polish pronunciation: [ˈɕfidɲik]) is a village in the administrative district of Gmina Łososina Dolna, within Nowy Sącz County, Lesser Poland Voivodeship, in southern Poland.
