= Bílsko (Olomouc District) =

- Municipality
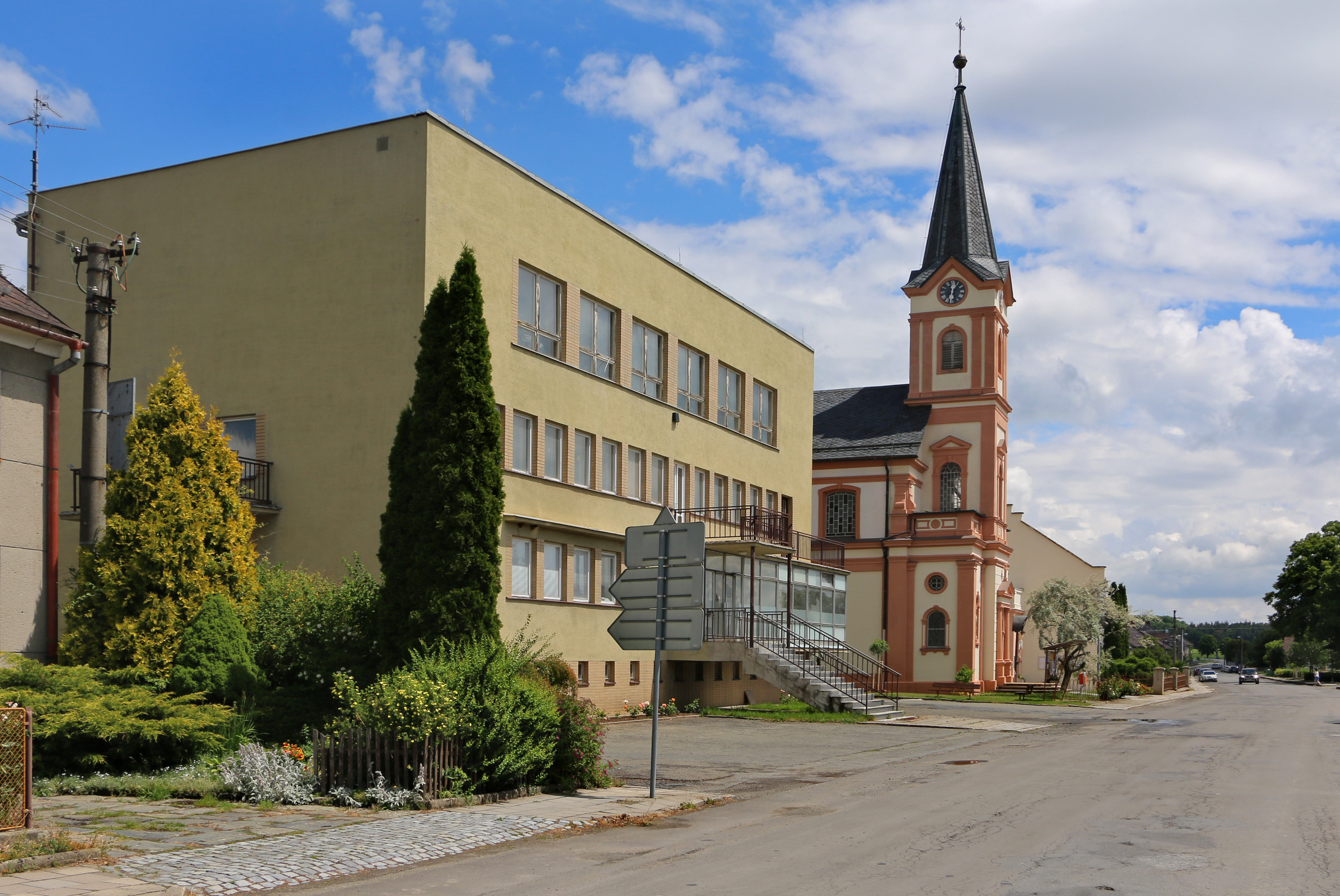
- Church of the Sacred Heart

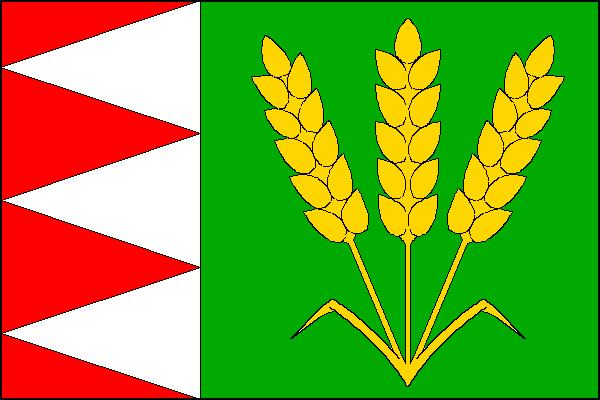
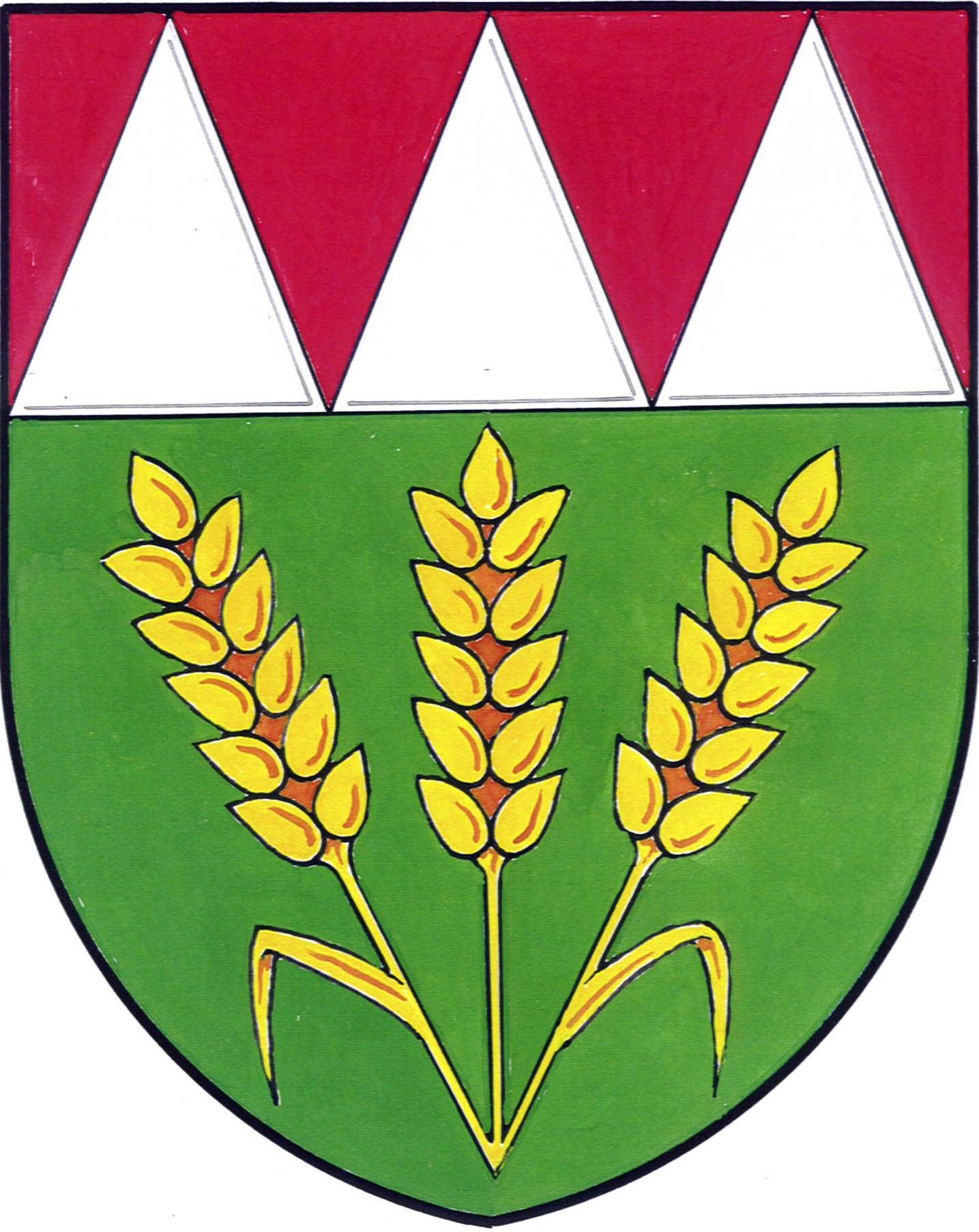
- Flag Coat of arms

- Location in the Czech Republic
- Coordinates: 49°38′40″N 17°1′11″E
- Country: Czech Republic
- Region: Olomouc
- District: Olomouc
- First mentioned: 1349

Area
  - Total: 3.73 km^{2} (1.44 sq mi)
- Elevation: 346 m (1,135 ft)

Population (2026-01-01)
  - Total: 235
  - Density: 63.0/km^{2} (163/sq mi)
- Time zone: UTC+1 (CET)
  - Summer (DST): UTC+2 (CEST)
- Postal code: 783 22
- Website: www.oubilsko.cz

Bílsko is a municipality and village in Olomouc District in the Olomouc Region of the Czech Republic. It has about 200 inhabitants.

Bílsko lies approximately 18 kilometres (11 mi) west of Olomouc and 193 km (120 mi) east of Prague.

== Demographics ==
Historical population
Year	Pop.	±%
1869	251	—
1880	258	+2.8%
1890	295	+14.3%
1900	299	+1.4%
1910	299	+0.0%
1921	314	+5.0%
1930	286	−8.9%
1950	199	−30.4%
1961	212	+6.5%
1970	193	−9.0%
1980	196	+1.6%
1991	191	−2.6%
2001	204	+6.8%
2011	217	+6.4%
2021	237	+9.2%
Source: Censuses
