= Bílsko (Strakonice District) =

- Municipality
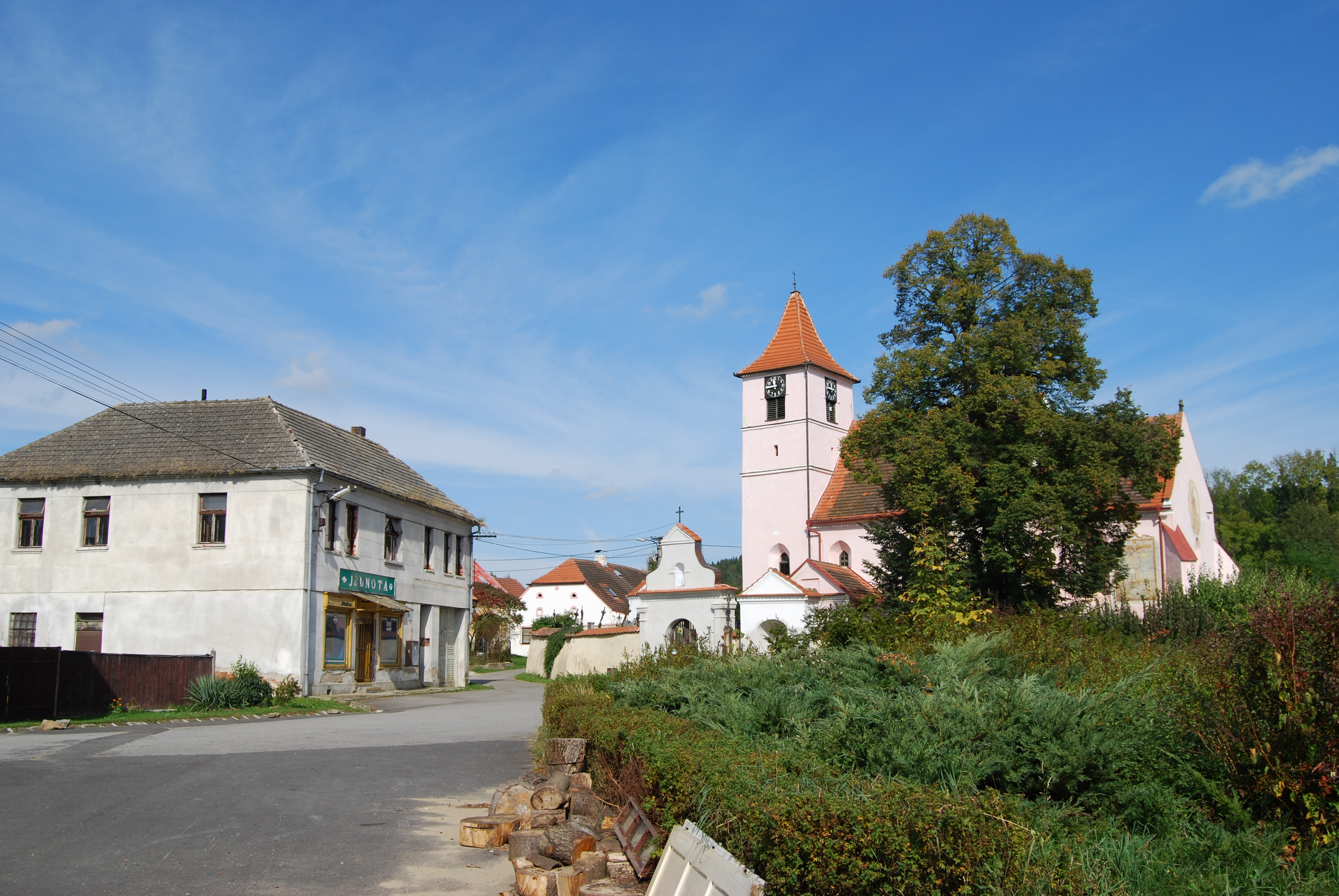
- Centre of Bílsko with the Church of Saint James the Great

- Location in the Czech Republic
- Coordinates: 49°9′33″N 14°3′32″E
- Country: Czech Republic
- Region: South Bohemian
- District: Strakonice
- First mentioned: 1352

Area
  - Total: 11.32 km^{2} (4.37 sq mi)
- Elevation: 457 m (1,499 ft)

Population (2026-01-01)
  - Total: 201
  - Density: 17.8/km^{2} (46.0/sq mi)
- Time zone: UTC+1 (CET)
  - Summer (DST): UTC+2 (CEST)
- Postal code: 387 73
- Website: www.bilsko.eu

Bílsko is a municipality and village in Strakonice District in the South Bohemian Region of the Czech Republic. It has about 200 inhabitants.

Bílsko lies approximately 17 kilometres (11 mi) south-east of Strakonice, 37 km (23 mi) north-west of České Budějovice, and 107 km (66 mi) south of Prague.

== Administrative division ==
Bílsko consists of three municipal parts (in brackets population according to the 2021 census):

- Bílsko (129)
- Netonice (40)
- Záluží (30)

== Demographics ==
Historical population
Year	Pop.	±%
1869	551	—
1880	607	+10.2%
1890	566	−6.8%
1900	569	+0.5%
1910	577	+1.4%
1921	585	+1.4%
1930	506	−13.5%
1950	372	−26.5%
1961	326	−12.4%
1970	257	−21.2%
1980	258	+0.4%
1991	229	−11.2%
2001	206	−10.0%
2011	215	+4.4%
2021	199	−7.4%
Source: Censuses
