= Tęgoborze =

- Village
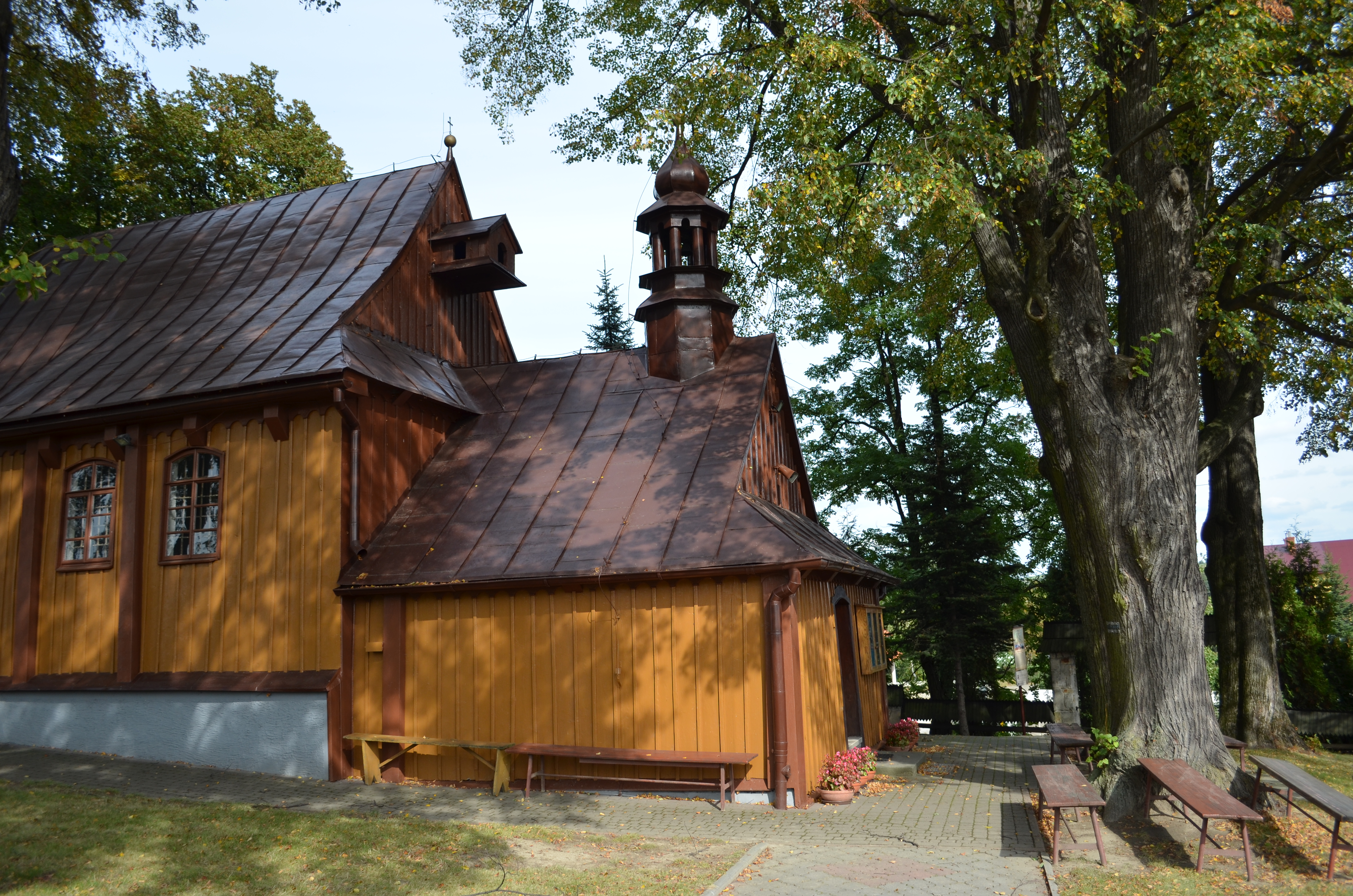
- Saint Mary filial church

- Location within Poland
- Coordinates: 49°42′28″N 20°38′29″E
- Country: Poland
- Voivodeship: Lesser Poland
- County: Nowy Sącz
- Gmina: Łososina Dolna
- Population: 1,100

Tęgoborze [tɛŋɡɔˈbɔʐɛ] is a village in the administrative district of Gmina Łososina Dolna, within Nowy Sącz County, Lesser Poland Voivodeship, in southern Poland.

== See also ==
- Tęgoborze Palace
