= Rostyslav Shtyn =

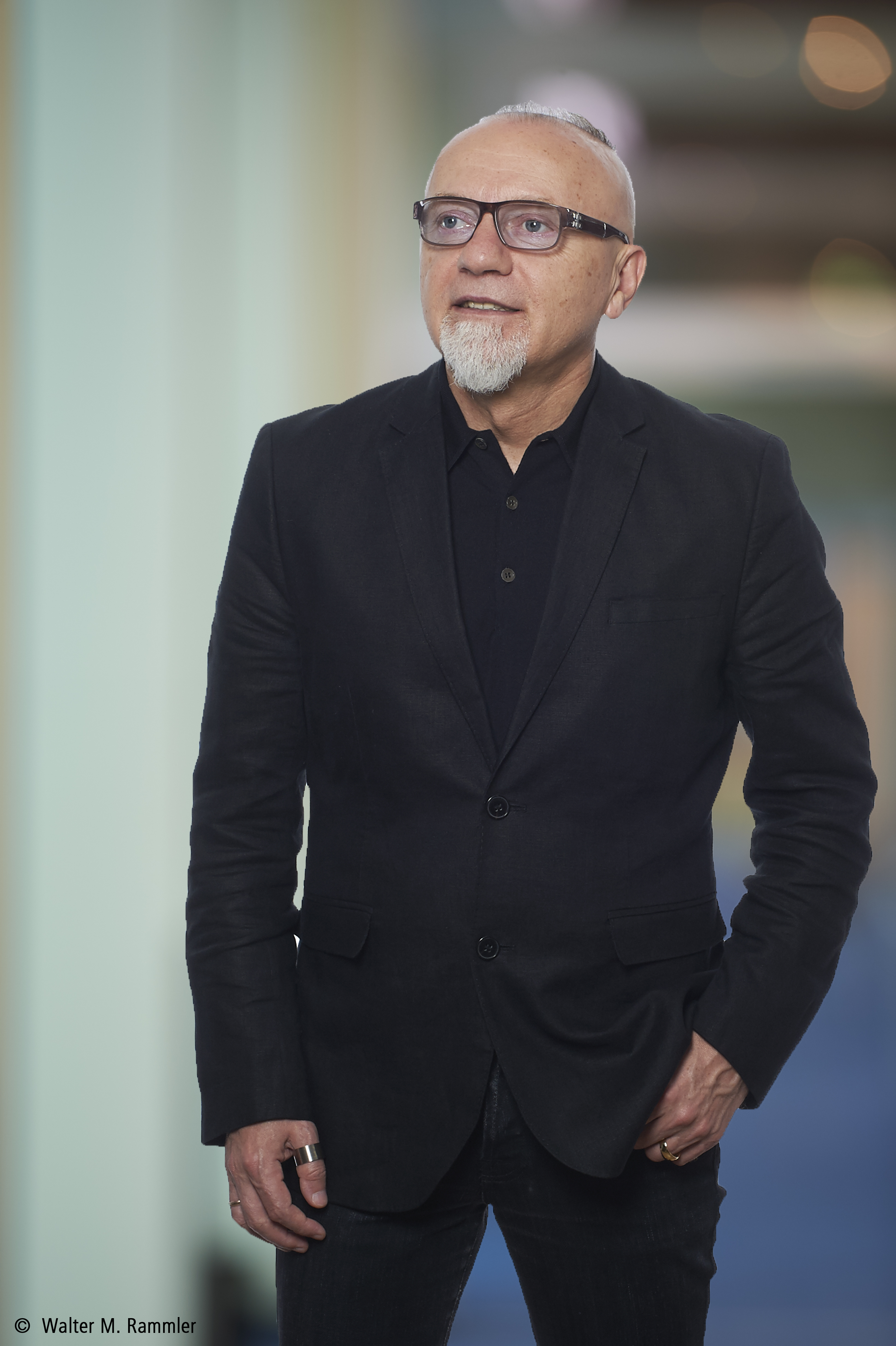
- Born: September 19, 1957 (age 69); Khodoriv, Ukraine
- Citizenship: Canadian
- Education: Ivano-Frankivsk Pedagogical Institute, Kyiv National University of Culture and Arts
- Occupation: Entrepreneur
- Known for: Setting up the first professional music agency in Ukraine
- Board member of: PEPA Beteiligungs GmbH
- Spouse: Lida (Popadyuk) Shtyn (1982– )

Rostyslav Shtyn (Ukrainian: Ростислав Романович Штинь, born September 19, 1957) in the town of Khodoriv located in Lviv Oblast, Ukraine is a Ukrainian-Canadian musician, producer of music, film and television projects, a businessman and entrepreneur.

He played a figurative role in the development of Ukrainian music during the period of perebudova, also known as Perestroika in the Russian language, and during the formative years of an independent Ukraine. As Ukrainian music specialist and critic, Oleskandr Yevtushenko writes: "The first swallow of Ukrainian show-business was Rostyslav Shtyn, what a "new Ukrainian" he was back then, when such a label didn't even exist. It was 1992."

== Biography ==
=== Youth and education ===
Born on September 19, 1957 as the first of two sons born to ethnically Ukrainian parents Roman Shtyn who hailed from Ustrzyki Dolne and Stefaniya Shtyn (née Tsybran) who was from Demydiv just about six kilometres SW of Khodoriv. In 1974 he completed his studies at Khodoriv Secondary School No. 2 and that same year he completed seven years of musical studies at the local musical school. In 1979 he completed his studies at the Vasyl Stefanyk Pedagogical Institute in Ivano-Frankivsk, graduating from the faculty of music.

In 1996 Shtyn received a diploma in Directing Pop and Massive Celebrations from the Kyiv National University of Culture and Arts.

=== As a musician ===
Shtyn's musical activity started as a musician being involved with VIA music, or Vocal Instrumental Ensembles, which at the time seemed to be all the rage as a counter to the influence of western Rock and roll and a way to allow domestic contemporary music to develop. His first participation was with VIA Opryshky where he played both violin and guitar in 1975. Some time after 1981 when Vatra was under the leadership of Ihor Bilozir. Shtyn joined the group playing violin and guitar. Over time differences of opinion developed between Shtyn and Bilozir. Shtyn tried to convince Bilozir that he should abandon the completely folkloric style of Vatra and take a new approach. When this failed Shtyn left Vatra and formed Zhayvir as an alternative playing guitar and violin.

It was not uncommon for authorities in the Ukrainian Soviet Socialist Republic to make it difficult for those who did not fit into the expected box. With Zhayvir being affiliated with the local philharmonic by 1984 Zhayvir was constantly under pressure from authorities, though they were still invited to tour and due to their busy schedule Shtyn eventually left the group when he was invited to Leningrad by Albert Asadullin to work with him. Shtyn had a different vision, due to the control that was always present with these government controlled Vocal Instrumental Ensembles, and this was also a contributing factor of his moving on.

The mid-1980s Shtyn collaborated with Volodymyr Prasalenko and Yuriy Sayenko, who had been in Zhayvir with him to produce Ukraine's first Rock opera. Based on a poem by Justinas Marcinkevičius entitled The Wall: an urban poem, written in 1965 the three had little time to compose the music for this work. According to witnesses the three took their respective parts of the poem and it was only later in studio in Kyiv where Shtyn pulled together the three compositions and fused them into a final work, a combination of Rock music, Classical music and Experimental music. This work was filmed for television by Tetyana Mahar and featured Larisa Dolina and Albert Asadullin singing the arias and actors Nataliya Sumska and Anatoliy Khostikoyev playing the main roles.

Upon, completion of this project Shtyn along with Zhayvir were invited to work together with Asadullin in Leningrad which resulted in Everything That Happened to Us.

Upon his return to Lviv from working with Asadullin in Leningrad in 1987, he invited his brother Yuriy Shtyn who had moved to Lviv after completing his studies in Rivne, to form their own studio, Holos, meaning "voice" in the Ukrainian language. While it was still not possible for individuals to set up private businesses within Soviet Ukraine, the Holos studio was set up as a collective. In three years, from 1986 through 1989 Shtyn set up the studio, helped his brother Yuriy Shtyn with the musical project and predecessor to Opalni Prinz, Strus Mozku, in English Brain Concussion. That group included both Shtyn brothers, Roman Brytsky, Boris Rosenthul and a young actress from the Zankovetska Theatre by the name of Lyudmila Razik, in addition he also set up the Rostyslav-show agency.

Three of most important principles of the Rostyslav-show agency and Opalnyi Prynz were the idea of technical and financial independence and high quality sound.

The group consisted of Yuriy Shtyn, who composed the material, sang and played keyboards; Toomas Vanem, lead guitar; second keyboardist, Roman Brytsky; and the elder Shtyn on vocals and guitar.

Opalnyi Prynz recorded their first singles: Mandry – Mandry 1987, Pozychayesh pamyat – You Borrow memory, Chorna Dira – Black Hole, Leonid Brezhnev, which received airplay on Radio Liberty, and Paskuda – Hussy. Those were very socially and musically "different" singles and were part of their first album also named Mandry. A few more singles would be released: Shantrapa – Riff-raff 1987; from the Wanderings album; other singles included Kombi u L’vovi – Kombi in L'viv – 1988; Tankova attaka – Tank attack (in Russian) this composition included saxophonist Zenon Kovpak 1989; and, Hey Ukraino! – Hey Ukraine! the opening track of their second album Nova revolutsiya, New revolution in 1991.

The principles which Shtyn espoused regarding financial and technical independence and quality sound, came through completely in the second album Nova revolutsia released in 1990. "Undoubtedly, all tracks of the album were inspired by the tectonic shifts in the life of Ukrainian society. It permeated the movement for freedom, the feeling of changes. At the same time perfectly recorded."

In 1991 one of Opalnyi Prynz's videos to their song Nash prapor from their Nova revolyutsiya album received broadcast time on MTV in honour of Ukraine's newly gained independence.

=== As a producer ===
Shtyn's experience as a producer took shape in many different areas from sound to video and event production.

==== Events ====
- 1992 – Kyiv, President and general producer of the Vernsiage-92. Nova Ukrainiinska Khvylia – Vernisage-92. A New Ukrainian Wave. A three-day festival featuring three different venues for different genres of Ukrainian music. A business forum and regular press conferences and media coverage were held in conjunction with the artistic program of the festival;
- 1992 – Bonn, Producer/director of a presentation Nova Ukraina – A New Ukraine;
- 1996 – Bonn/Petersberg, Cultural program for the Council of German Ukrainian Cooperation;
- 2003 – Fulda, Cultural program Borussia goes Arts.

==== Film ====
- 2006 – Lviv Director of independent documentary film Spokiy Lychakova – Keep my soul, cameraman Vadym Piskaryov. The edition of the film released as part of the City of Lviv's 750th Anniversary project, which Yuriy Hnatovsky was directly involved with, though he was not involved with the original production of the film which was done many years earlier.

==== Radio & Television ====
- 1989 Lviv Konservotoria Lviv TV;
- 1990 Kyiv Fantom UT1 – Ukraine's First National Channel;
- 1992 Kyiv Vernisage-92. Nova Ukrainska Khvylia UT1 Ukraine's First National Channel, UT2 Ukraine's Second National Channel;
- 2007 – Kyiv Skhidna liha – Eastern league Radio Continent FM, 100.9.

==== Sound ====
- 1985 – Produced Ukraine's first Rock-opera Stina − The Wall. Featuring featured Larisa Dolina and Albert Asadullin;
- 1986 – Produced for Albert Asadullin's LP entitled Vse eto s nami bulo – All this happened to us on the Melodiya label;
- 1989–1990 – Produced Opalnyi Prynz's second album entitled Nova revolyutsia – New revolution;
- 1991 – Produced Dead Rooster first album entitled ETO;
- 2008 – Produced the double CD set of piano music by Ukrainian composers entitled The Vancouver Collection – Undiscovered Geniuses performed by Ethella Chupryk.

==== Video ====
- 1989 Lviv, produced Tankova ataka − Tank attack for Opalni prinz;
- 1990 Lviv, produced Nash prapor − Our flag for Opalni prinz;
- 1990 Lviv, produced Rozmyti dorohy − Washed out roads for Opalni prinz.

== Business interests ==
Without a doubt Shtyn's business career started with the creation of the Holos studio to which he had invited his brother Yuriy Shtyn. This was the precursor of the Rostyslav-show agency. Not only did the agency provide support for Opalni prinz, it played a role in the development of a number of different groups developing in Lviv at the end of the 1980s. Lviv-based Mertviy piven, Dead Rooster recorded their first album ETO under guidance of the agency. Others that were ushered along in their early music careers by the agency included Iryna Bilyk and the Skryabin.

According to journalist and contemporary Ukrainian music specialist Oleksandr Yevtushenko, Rostyslav Shtyn was not only one of the oldest rockers at concerts of the Lviv-based band 999 in the mid to late 1980s, not to be confused with the English punk rock band which preceded them of the same name 999, but also one of the first serious show-businessmen in Ukraine. While Yevtushenko is very knowledgeable about contemporary music, his use of artistic license, about which concerts Shtyn attended may have been a little extended, he is correct about the fact that Shtyn from the time of Zhayvir approached music as a business in order to be independent from government control, as well as being independent financially, technically in terms of having access to technology and ensuring that the quality of their sound was unsurpassed. This had always been Shtyn's approach and continues to be his approach in all business projects.

=== Aktsionerno-Komertsiyniy Bank "Halytskiy" ===
In late 1991, Shtyn together with Oleksandr Hryniv as the chairman registered a private bank called Aktsionerno-Komertsiyniy Bank "Halytskiy" and received their license on February 21, 1992 word is that Shtyn was a majority shareholder in the said institution

=== Vernisage-92: Nova Ukrainianska Khvylia ===
The Vernisage-92: Nova Ukrainianska Khvylia – Vernisage-92: New Ukrainian Wave was conceived as not a music project, but as a commercial venture. As mentioned above, there were three different cultural events at three different venues in Kyiv, Ukraine; however, there were also a number of business related forums. Many of which lead to Shtyn's visit to Washington DC as part of a Ukrainian delegation, together with Leonid Kravchuk, in search of international financing for Ukraine's transformation from state controlled businesses to the privatization of the nation, however it is very clear that Shtyn was not part of the band as suggested by The Ukrainian Weekly article. Vika Vradiy during a period in 1992, had been working directly with the Rostyslav-show agency and after the Vernisage-92 presentation was to have had a European tour with Opalnyi Prynz.

From those who attended the press conferences it was evident that Shtyn was working with Michael Andre Lewis as he had stated that he was working on European tour for Opalnyi Prynz and Sestrychka Vika the stage name of Vika Vradiy. Unfortunately this was never realized for a number of different reasons.

After Vernisage:92, Shtyn together with the League of Ukrainian Businessmen, which at the time was headed by Sergey Pogоrelov and Oleksiy Ivchenko, who later was to become Chairman of Naftohaz of Ukraine, were tasked by the Ukrainian government to work with a number of different international financial institutions such as Merrill Lynch and others to finance government programs, this led to Shtyn doing a great deal of the preparatory work for President Leonid Kravchuk's official state visit to the United States from May 5 −11 of 1992.

It is clear from Shtyn's activities that by the time the Rostyslav-show agency ceased operations Shtyn, had left Ukraine with a focus on German-Ukrainian relations from the projects he was producing in Bonn, Germany.

=== CSS consulting GmbH ===
Shtyn was co-owner of Hüttenberg-based CSS consulting GmbH which worked on marketing for Uhlsport, Boeringer Ingelheim Backmittel GmbH, which was sold by its parent company Boehringer Ingelheim. Boeringer Ingelheim Backmittel GmbH main business was a series of stabilization products used in the baking industry, this led Shtyn with his partners to form the Joint venture RL(meaning Rostyslav and Lida, that first names of Shtyn and his wife) Company Prosto dobriy khlib, meaning "Simply good bread", with Ukrainian partners in 1996.

=== H&S Sportsmanagement GmbH ===
Shtyn was co-owner of Frankfurt-based H&S Sportsmanagement GmbH. This firm worked on marketing projects for the Bundesliga and Shtyn acted as Nevio Scala's agent during negotiations with Rinat Akhmetov's FC Shakhtar Donetsk, and succeeded in transferring Scala to the club. Just ten days before Scala was signed to FC Shakhtar Donetsk UEFA had reported that Scala may have pulled out of running for the top coaching job.

=== Football Innovation Programm GmbH / SC Borussia Fulda ===
Co-owner of Fulda-based Football Innovation Programm GmbH and from early 2001 he was Sports director at SC Borussia Fulda. Football is a very political business at a professional level and eventually due to the politics of the game Shtyn was forced out of the position of Sports director at Borussia Fulda Fussball GmbH by June 2004.

On July 3, 2015, in an interview with the German football publicationTorgrante clarifies Shtyn's role at the current time regarding his relationship with Borussia Fulda.

=== Agency for Innovative Cultural Programs Danapro Ltd ===
Co-founder of Agency for Innovative Cultural Programs Danapro Ltd in 2006, Kyiv, Ukraine. Shtyn's takes on the management of the Telnyuk Sisters, though the relationship is short-lived. Shtyn takes the lead to form an international consortium of three legal entities, Implenia, Axon and Danapro in order to bid on the tender to build a new stadium in Lviv for the UEFA Euro 2012 football championships.

=== Gladio Sports Intelligence GmbH ===
Shtyn founds Gladio Sports Intelligence GmbH in Fulda, Germany on November 8, 2011 with his son Marko Shtyn listed as director of the company. According to the company's website "Gladio Sports Intelligence is a company that specializes in project development, marketing, brand management, communications and project consulting in sports.".

In the autumn of 2012 Shtyn, who had previously acted as agent for Nevio Scala, works as an agent for Achim Feifel and successfully transfers him as head coach for the WFC Rossiyanka in Moscow.

According to the German online publication Volkstimme.de Gladio Sports Intelligence GmbH of Fulda will be developing a multifunctional sports park in the village of Ackendorf, with a value of €40 million. According to Wirshschafts Blatt, Gladio Sports Intelligence GmbH together with Shtyn are general shareholders in a new startup up called PEPA Beteiligungs GmbH, other share holders include Alexander Sonin, Yuri Petukhov and German Pellets GmbH
