= Fris =

Fris is a surname. Notable people with the surname include:

- Barbara Fris (born 1956), Canadian soprano and actress
- Christina Fris (1757–1835), Swedish industrialist and merchant
- Edward S. Fris (1921–2010), American lieutenant general
- Francesc Gaset Fris (born 1947), Andorran sport shooter
- Ihor Fris (born 1973), Ukrainian notary and politician
- Jan Friš (born 1995), Czech middle-distance runner
- Kristijan Fris (born 1984), Serbian wrestler
- Pieter Fris (1627–1706), Dutch Golden Age painter

== See also ==
- Frïs Vodka, a Danish vodka brand
