= Kupchak =

Kupchak or Kupczak is a Polish surname and may refer to:

- Józef Kupczak (1917–1999), Polish road racing cyclist
- Mateusz Kupczak (born 1992), Polish footballer
- Mitchell "Mitch" Kupchak (born 1954), American basketball player and manager
- Szczepan Kupczak (born 1992), Polish Nordic combined skier
- Volodymyr Kupchak (born 1978), Ukrainian politician

== See also ==
- Kipchaks
