= Yuriy Shtyn =

Yuriy Shtyn Юрій Штинь
- Also known as: Yurok Shtyn
- Born: 1 January 1967 (age 59); Khodoriv, Ukrainian SSR, Soviet Union
- Occupations: Musician; Composer; Producer

Yuriy Romanovych Shtyn (Note: Ukrainian: Юрій Романович Штинь, romanized: Yurii Romanovych Shtyn) (born 1 January 1967, known by the diminutive Yurok) (Note: Ukrainian: Юрок, romanized: Yurok) is a Ukrainian Canadian musician, composer, and producer. Born in Khodoriv, Lviv Oblast, Ukraine, Shtyn is the younger brother of Rostyslav Shtyn and was the lyricist and composer for the bands Strus Mozgu, which later became Opalnyi Prynz, and producer of the project which came later called Loony Pelen.

== Biographical ==
Born on 1 January 1967 as the second of two sons born to ethnically Ukrainian parents: Roman Shtyn, who hailed from Ustrzyki Dolne, and Stefaniya Shtyn (née Tsybran), who was from Demydiv just about six kilometres southwest of Khodoriv.
