= Opalnyi Prynz =

Ukrainian folk-rock band

- Origin: Lviv, Ukrainian Soviet Socialist Republic, (Now Lviv, Ukraine)
- Genres: Rock, folk rock
- Years active: 1987–1991
- Label: Phonograph
- Past members: Rostyslav Shtyn; Yuriy Shtyn "Yurok"; Roman Brytsky; Toomas Vanem; Sergiy Ryazantsev

Opalnyi Prynz (Ukrainian: Опальний Принц) was an influential and popular Ukrainian folk-rock band which came out of musical project called Strus Mozku (Ukrainian: Струс Мозку), or 'Brain Concussion', in English, which started in 1987 when Rostyslav Shtyn's younger brother Yuriy Shtyn relocated to Lviv, Ukraine after completing his studies at the conservatory in Rivne.

The Strus Mozku project included the following individuals: both Shtyn brothers, Roman Brytsky, Boris Rosenthul and a young actress from the Zankovetska Theatre in Lviv, by the name of Lyudmila Razik. This project eventually morphed into Opalnyi Prynz with Yuriy Shtyn composing all of the material both musically and lyrically, singing and play keyboards, his older brother Rostyslav Shtyn, played guitar and provided vocals. Roman Brytsky stayed on as a second keyboardist

It was with this composition of the group with which Opalnyi Prinz recorded their first singles which included: Mandry – Wanderings in 1987, Pozychayesh pamyat – You Borrow memory, Chorna Dira – Black Hole, Leonid Brezhnev, which received airplay on Radio Liberty, and Paskuda – Hussy. All these compositions were very socially and musically "different" singles and made up their first album also entitled Mandry after their first recorded single.

A few more singles would be released from their first album Mandry: Shantrapa – Riff-raff 1987; other singles included Kombi u L’vovi – Kombi in L'viv – 1988, a satirical song about the groups meeting with the Polish group Kombi during their performance in Lviv; Tankova attaka – Tank attack(in Russian) which included saxophonist Zenon Kovpak, in 1989 which was politically oriented at what the USSR's role was in Afghanistan; and, Hey Ukraino! – Hey Ukraine!, which would become the opening track of their second album Nova revolyutsiya New revolution 1991.

Their second album, Nova Revolyutsia, released in 1991 was filled out with Toomas Vanem on lead guitar. Authorities didn't like what they heard on the new album (cassette) with a release of 30,000 copies. Many of the songs were not appreciated by Soviet authorities, songs like Nova Revolyutsiya, as well as the lead song Hey Ukraino! and probably the others were just a little pro-Ukrainian, and as a result, within weeks of the album's release, no copies could be found at the regular state run music stores

This is what Ukrainian music critic and journalist Oleksandr Yevtushenko wrote in one of his compilations on contemporary Ukrainian music:

"I first heard the group OPALNYI PRYNZ on the broadcasts of the Ukrainian service of Radio Liberty. The songs Hey Ukraino!, Nash Prapor were played every day. That was at the end of the 1980s. But to find out anything about the group was only possible after the release of their first album Mandry. And after that as music of the "secretive inhabitants of Lviv" Ukrainian Radio started to play them and the became radio-hits. Rostyslav Shtyn and company came out into the information field. But they did not try to conquer it, because first and foremost they were concerned with the creation of a European level of musical infrastructure with their own agency, recording studio. What we are talking about here is a well equipped national factory of stars. The idea didn't leave Rostyslav alone. Thank God, that he gathered his organizational skills and musical talent. First of all there was his musical education – Rostyslav's education is as a violinist. There was the persistent work with stars of multifarious stages. At the end of the 1980s the main matter became his group OPALNYI PRYNZ. It was created by: Yuri Shtyn (his younger brother), who plays keyboards, sings, and writes the music and lyrics, Toomas Vanem – lead guitar and still one other keyboardist Roman Brytsky and singer and guitarist Rostyslav Shtyn. The path of OPALNYI PRYNZ cardinally is different from generally accepted schemes. Because for they had the idea of technical and financial independence and perfect quality of how they sounded. The group signed a contract with one German producers centre and received the possibility of publishing its materials on both sides of the Iron Curtain. At the end of 1990 OPALNYI PRYNZ realizes its next project – the album Nova Revolyutsiya. Indisputably, all the tracks of the album are woven with the tectonic changes in the life of Ukrainian society. It's impregnated with movement towards freedom, the feeling of change. Concurrently it is beautifully recorded. And the video clip to the song Nash Prapor was shown on Ukrainian television all the way through to the year 2000. Some people confirm, that this clip was shown on MTV in honor of Ukraine's declaration of independence in 1991. Nova Revolyutsiya – these are very strong and unique compositions Khlib po vodi (Bread upon the water), Rozmyti dorohy (Washed out roads), Ty na viyni (You are at war), Simnadtsyate veresnya (1939 The Seventeenth of September), Braty po zbroyii (Brothers in Arms). These are songs that one does not forget. Regardless of their primarily studio plane of existence, OPALNYI PRYNZ had a considerable influence on the formation of Ukrainian rock-music, certain models in their sound in particular, we are talking about the synthesis of ethnic music with rock. It is possible that they were the first that did it delicately and convincingly. It's incredible, but OPALNYI PRYNZ even today sounds fresh and real."

One of the most important principles which was espoused by Opalnyi Prynz and Rostyslav Shtyn was the importance of financial and technical independence from government structures. It was under the new developments of Perebudova that in 1987 that the elder Shtyn set up the Holos Studio as a cooperative which eventually developed into the studio of Rostyslav-show.

Opalniy Prinz was very much a studio band and seldom appeared live.

In 1991 one of Opalnyi Prynz's videos to their song Nash prapor from their Nova revolyutsiya album received broadcast time on MTV in honour of Ukraine's newly gained independence.

Within the first years of Ukraine's independence Opalniy Prynz ceased an active existence, though it was not completely inactive. In 1992 it played an active role in a project entitled Vernsiage-92. Nova Ukrainiinska Khvylia – Vernisage-92. A New Ukrainian Wave. After this production Vika Vradiy together with Opalniy Prynz were to embark on a European tour, however, something didn't work out and the tour was canceled.

What followed was an interesting and progressive cooperation between Yuriy Shtyn and Vlad Dobriansky, in Looney Pelen.
