= Volodymyr Kupchak =

Ukrainian politician and energy scientist

- Володимир Купчак
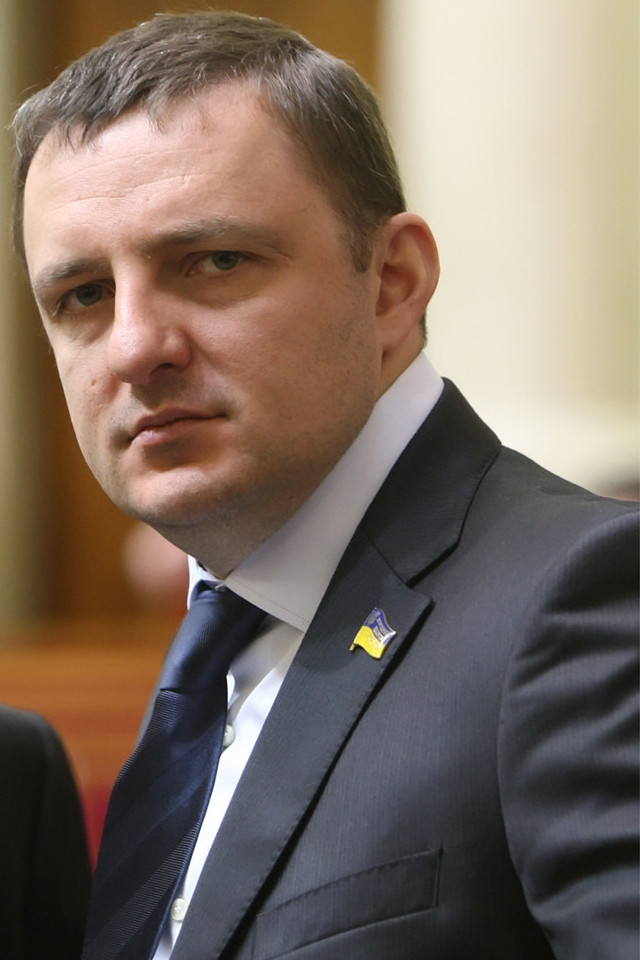

People's Deputy of Ukraine
- In office 12 December 2012 – 27 November 2014
- Preceded by: Constituency established
- Succeeded by: Mykhailo Dovbenko
- Constituency: Ivano-Frankivsk Oblast, No. 84

Personal details
- Born: 7 April 1978 (age 48) Ivano-Frankivsk, Ukrainian SSR, Soviet Union (now Ukraine)
- Party: Batkivshchyna
- Education: Ivano-Frankivsk National Technical University of Oil and Gas; Vasyl Stefanyk Subcarpathian National University

Volodymyr Romanovych Kupchak (Ukrainian: Володимир Романович Купчак; born 7 April 1978) is a Ukrainian energy scientist and politician who served as a People's Deputy of Ukraine in the 7th Ukrainian Verkhovna Rada from Ukraine's 84th electoral district.

== Biography and education ==
Volodymyr Kupchak was born 7 April 1978 in Ivano-Frankivsk. From 1995 to 2000 he studied at the Ivano-Frankivsk National Technical University of Oil and Gas and obtained a master's degree in the economics of oil and gas. He attended the same school in 2008–2010 and attained the same designation as Engineer of pipelines. In 2007 he completed postgraduate studies at the Vasyl Stefanyk Subcarpathian National University, obtaining a degree in demography, labor economics, social and economic policies. His Ph.D. is in economics. His dissertation topic was "The formation of tariffs for gas distribution companies". Master of Engineering, Master of Law. Doctor of Economic Sciences, Economics of energy and environmental economics, Full Professor.

=== Education ===
- 2016-2017

Law Degree (with honors), Specialty – General Law, Western Ukrainian National University, Ternopil, Ukraine.

- 2012

Arbitration Manager Diploma, International Academy of Finances and Investments, Kyyiv, Ukraine.

- 2009-2010

Diploma in Engineering, Specialty - Gas and oil pipelines, gas and oil storages – designing and building, Ivano-Frankivsk National Technical University of Oil and Gas.

- 2002-2006

Post graduate school, Specialty - Demography, social economy, state social policy, Vasyl Stefanyk Precarpathian National University, Ivano- Frankivs’k, Ukraine.

- 1995-2000

Master of Economics, Specialty – Economics of oil and gas, Ivano-Frankivsk National Technical University of Oil and Gas. Ranked Top 10 students.

DEGREES

- 2021

Academician, Academy of Economic Science of Ukraine http://www.aenu.org/en/

- 2020

Full Professor, Analytical and environmental economics.

- 2016

Doctor of Economic Sciences, Economics of energy and environmental economics, state and regional energy security, Thesis: Strategic management of energy efficiency.

- 2016

Associate Professor, International economics, marketing and management.

- 2011

Philosophy Doctor, Economics of Oil and Gas. Thesis: Forming of tariffs of gas-transporting and gas-supplying companies.

=== Career ===
- October 2022 – till now

Strategic Committee, Member, International Boxing Association, Lausanne, Switzerland. https://www.iba.sport/

- September 2016 – till now

Head of the Board, Co-owner, “Consultima Group” Ltd, Ivano-Frankivs’k, Ukraine, Consulting and investments in the field of energy, financing, and GR of renewable energy projects.

- December 2020 – December 2021

First Vice President Ukrainian State Company “Fishing Company S. A.”, Road-Town, British Virgin Islands. Company-owner of state international fishing fleet. Modernization and optimizing the Company, implementing the budgeting and control system, GR, defending the interests of State in the international courts.

- December 2018 – till now

Professor, Western Ukrainian National University, Ternopil, Ukraine, Ivano-Frankivs’k Education and Research Institute of Management (https://www.wunu.edu.ua/en/), Chair of International Economics. Lecturing, and supervising research and scientific work.

- September 2017 – till now

Professor, Lutsk National Technical University (https://lntu.edu.ua/en), Ukraine Economics, Management, Regional Economy Membership in Scientific Council.

- September 2016 – 2020,

Professor, Eastern European National University (https://vnu.edu.ua/en), Ternopil, Ukraine. Chair of Analytical and Environmental Economics Lecturing, supervising research and scientific work.

- May 2015 – December 2018,

Chief Executive Officer, “VolynOblEnergo” PJSC (https://energy.volyn.ua/#gsc.tab=0), Volyn region, Ukraine regional electricity transmitting and supplying company. General management, crisis management, implementation of anti-corruption measures and policy, optimizing and restructuring of the Company, smart grids system implementation in the Company of 2780 professionals, 390 000 customers.

- November 2012 – December 2014,

Member of the Parliament of Ukraine (https://www.rada.gov.ua/en) Head of Basic industries and innovations Subcommittee.

- January 2011 – November 2012,

Vice Head of the Board, Chief Development Officer in the field of Energy, Group of public companies “UkrLandFarming” PLC (https://www.ulf.com.ua/en/) and “Avangardco” IPL (https://avangardco.ua/). Companies, which own and operate 650 000 hectares of land in Ukraine and are second world egg producer. 31 700 employees. Implementation of renewable energy projects, the building of two bio-gas plants (20 MW each) in Khmelnytskyy and Kherson Regions, designing and financing of the network of 100 MW biogas/solar plants, international financing of the energy projects, taking part in IPO

- March 2007 - December 2010,

First Deputy Head of the Board, Chief Operating Officer, “Ukrainian Gas Financial-Consulting Group”, PLC. Company – the owner of 7 regional natural gas transporting and distributional companies – 7 regions of Ukraine, 17 000 employees, 3.2 million customers Building a holding and managing company, operation management, implementing the gas-losses decreasing system, building the network of 18 CNG-Stations, anti-corruption measures, GR, optimizing and restructuring the companies.

- September 2007 – December 2010,

Chief Executive Officer, “Ivano-Frankivs’k-Gas” PJSC, Ivano-Frankivs’k, Ukraine. Regional natural gas distribution and transporting company. https://if.dsoua.com/ua/ The total number of employees – 3 460, 340 000 customers. General management, crisis management, implementation of anti-corruption measures, optimizing and restructuring of the Company.

== Social activity ==
- 2022, October – till now

International Boxing Association IBA (https://www.iba.sport) Strategy Committee member

- 2022, February – till now

The International Assistance Headquarters for Ukrainians (IAHU, https://dopomoha.org.ua/en/about-us-2/) Member, one of the founders, Official International representative

- 2020 – till now,

Boxing Federation of Ukraine, Member of the Executive Committee, https://fbu.org.ua/federation.html?lang=en

- 2017 – 2020

Representative from Ukraine to Women’s Commission of IBA (https://www.iba.sport), Lausanne, Switzerland.

- 2016 – till now

President, Volyn Region Boxing Federation, Ukraine

- 2018 – till now

Chief Operational Director of the Kyiv Energy Research Institute KERI, NGO, think tank, Kyyiv, Ukraine.

- 2016 – 2020

Co-founder of the International Social Project – KnygaDobra (Book of Good).

- 2010 - 2012

Co-founder Kyiv International Energy Club “Q-Club”

- 1996 – 2006

Co-founder, President AEGEE-Ivano-Frankivsk, http://www.aegee.org .
