= Ihor Fris =

Ukrainian notary and politician

- Ігор Фріс
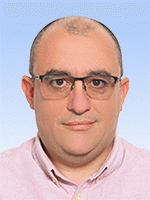
- Official portrait, 2019

People's Deputy of Ukraine
- Incumbent
- Assumed office 29 August 2019
- Preceded by: Mykhailo Dovbenko
- Constituency: Ivano-Frankivsk Oblast, No. 84

Personal details
- Born: 29 June 1973 (age 53) Ivano-Frankivsk, Ukrainian SSR, Soviet Union (now Ukraine)
- Party: Servant of the People
- Other political affiliations: Independent
- Education: Vasyl Stefanyk Precarpathian National University

Ihor Pavlovych Fris (Ukrainian: Ігор Павлович Фріс; born 29 June 1973) is a Ukrainian notary and politician currently serving as a People's Deputy of Ukraine from Ukraine's 84th electoral district since 29 August 2019.

== Early life and career ==
Ihor Pavlovych Fris was born on 29 June 1973 in the city of Ivano-Frankivsk, then part of the Soviet Union. From 1990 to 1992, he worked at the Rempobuttekhnika metal processing plant as a fitter, before working as a fitter at Sapfir automobile plant for a year. He subsequently worked as commercial director of Totus LLC from 1993 to 1996 before working as director of Leo-F LLC until 1998.

In 1998, Fris graduated from the Vasyl Stefanyk Precarpathian National University, specialising in law. The same year, he began working at the Sezon cooperative. From 1999 until 2019, he was a notary public in Ivano-Frankivsk, and from 2006 to 2014 served as Ukraine's permanent representative to the European commission of the International Union of Notaries.

== People's Deputy of Ukraine ==
In the 2015 Ukrainian local elections, Fris was a candidate for the Ivano-Frankivsk City Council's 26th district, nominated by UKROP. However, he was unsuccessful.

In the 2019 Ukrainian parliamentary election, Fris ran as a candidate for People's Deputy of Ukraine in Ukraine's 84th electoral district. He was the candidate of Servant of the People, although he was not a member of any party at the time of the election. He was ultimately successful, defeating incumbent People's Deputy Mykhailo Dovbenko of European Solidarity and Batkivshchyna candidate Andriy Ivaskiv, garnering 22.0% of the vote to Ivaskiv's 14.40% and Dovbenko's 12.88%. In the Verkhovna Rada (Ukraine's parliament), Fris joined the Servant of the People faction, as well as the Verkhovna Rada Legal Committee.

In March 2020, Fris, along with multiple other People's Deputies, announced his opposition to a proposal by the Trilateral Contact Group on Ukraine aimed at ending the war in Donbas by bringing separatist representatives into the government of Ukraine.
