= Jewish cemetery in Ustrzyki Dolne =

Jewish cemetery in Poland

Jewish cemetery in Utrzyki Dolne
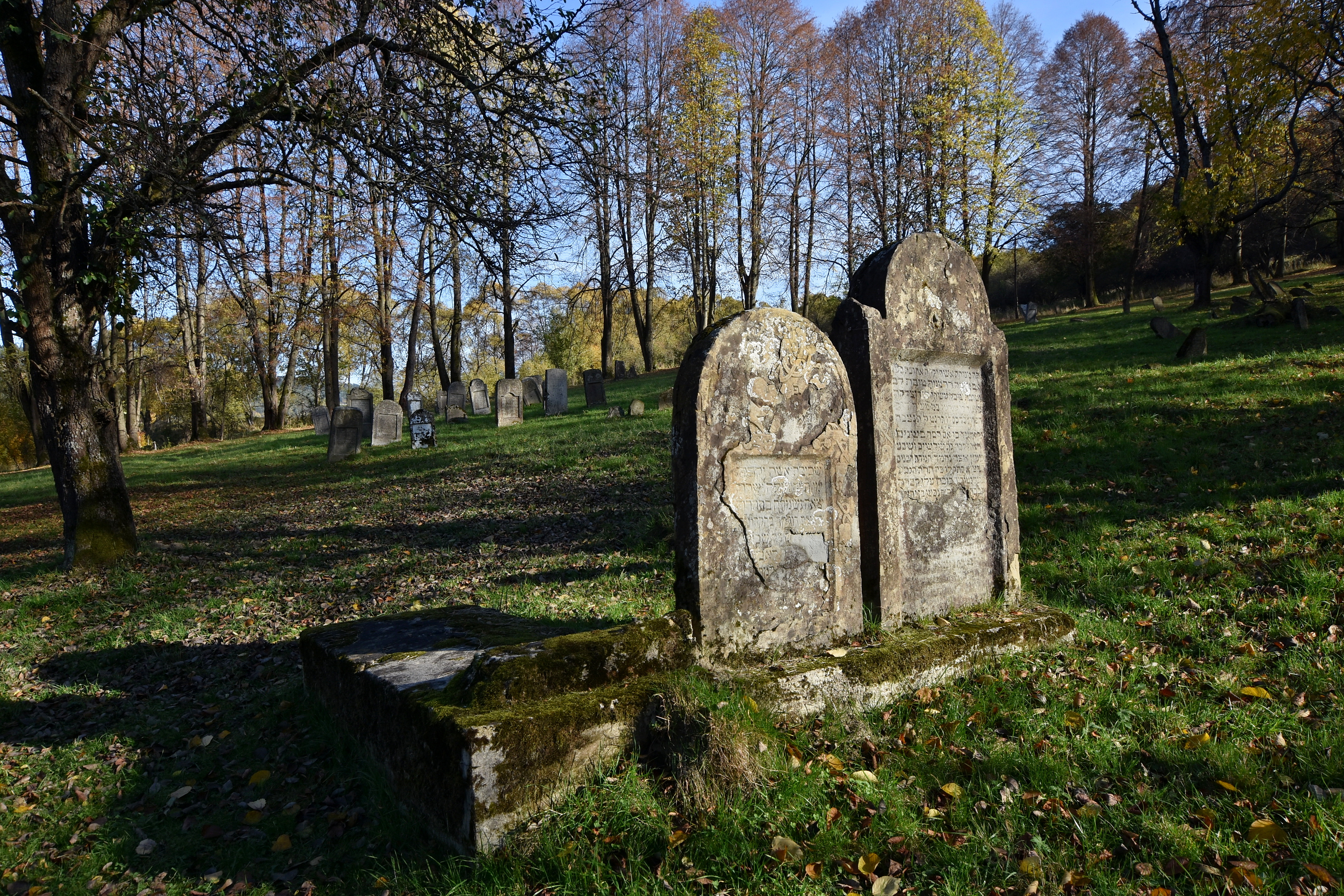
- Part of the cemetery
- Interactive map of Jewish cemetery in Utrzyki Dolne

Details
- Established: second half of the 18th century
- Location: Ustrzyki Dolne
- Country: Poland
- Coordinates: 49°25′37″N 22°35′15″E
- Type: Jewish
- Owned by: Foundation for the Preservation of Jewish Heritage
- Size: 0.8 ha (2.0 acres)

The Jewish cemetery in Ustrzyki Dolne in Poland served the Jewish community that once resided in Ustrzyki Dolne, and the surrounding areas, and was under the jurisdiction of the Ustrzyki qahal. The cemetery was likely established in the 18th century and is located in the southern part of the town. It was partially destroyed during World War II and is not listed in the register of historical monuments.

== Location ==
The Jewish cemetery in Ustrzyki Dolne is situated in the southern part of the town. There is no access to the cemetery via any municipal street; the only existing path is a dirt road leading from Kolejowa Street.

The cemetery has an irregular quadrilateral shape and is located on the northern slopes of Gromadzyń mountain. To the north, it borders the tracks of Stróże–Krościenko railway line; to the east, it is adjacent to fields and the football field of the local club; to the south, it is bordered by fields; and to the west, by an unnamed stream that feeds into the Strviazh river. The cemetery stretches along a north-south axis and covers an area of approximately 0.8 hectares. It occupies plots numbered 1795 and 1796. The cemetery is not enclosed, but rows of linden trees mark its natural boundaries to the east and south. There is no information available regarding the cemetery's enclosure before World War II, and no traces remain of the pre-burial house that once stood in the southwestern corner of the cemetery. Due to the absence of fencing, the cemetery is accessible from all sides. It is also unknown where the entrance was located before World War II.

== History ==
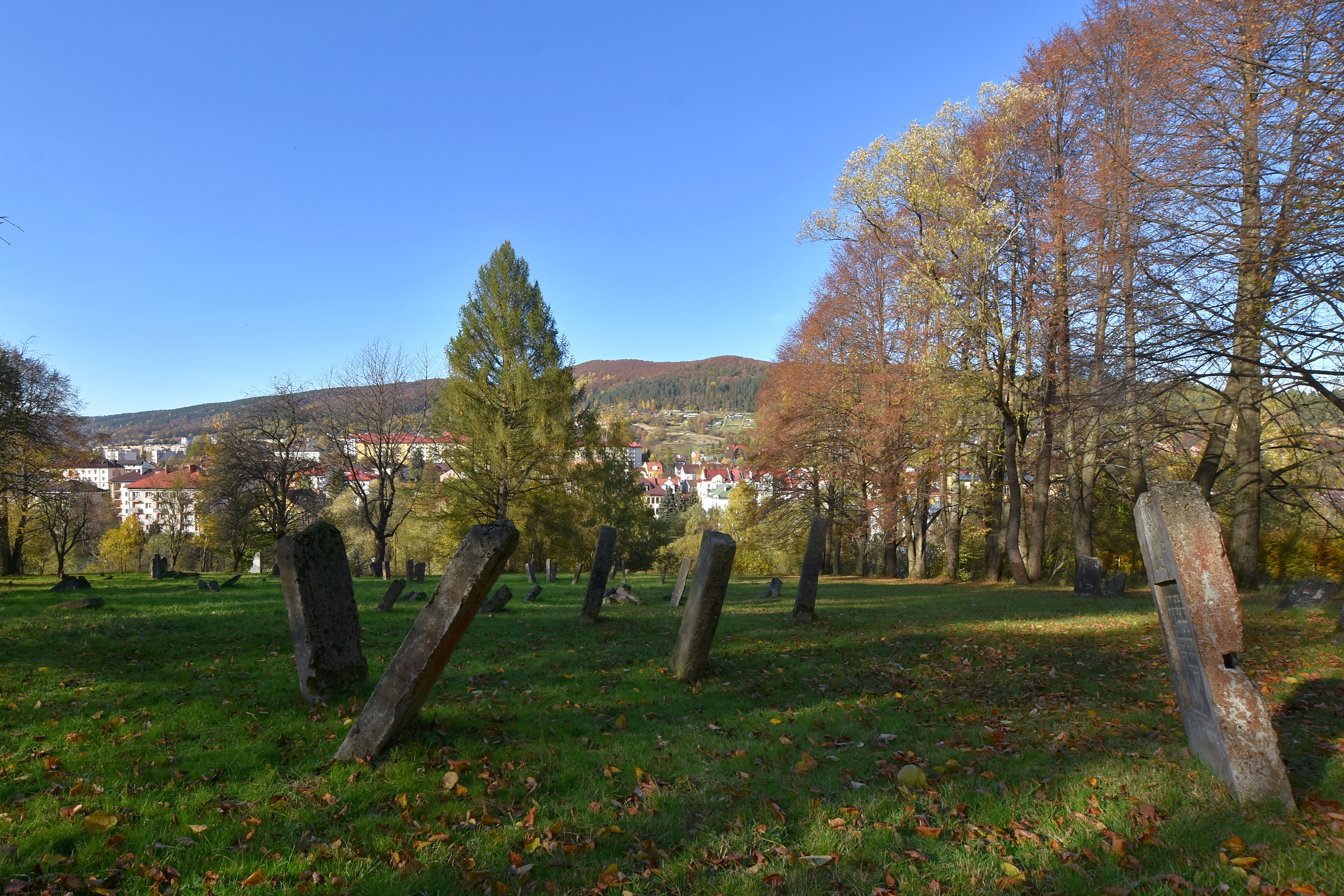
General view

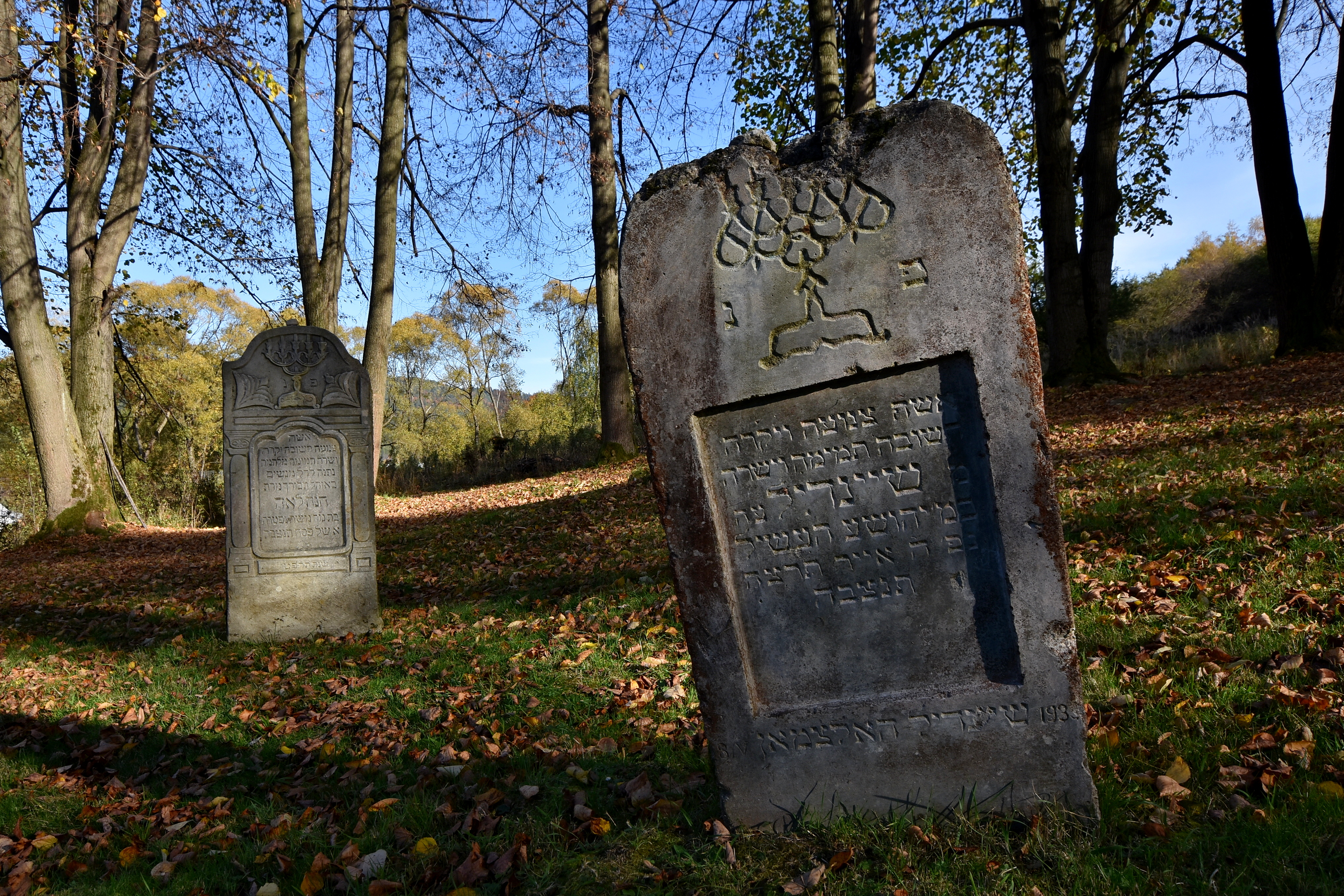
Gravestones

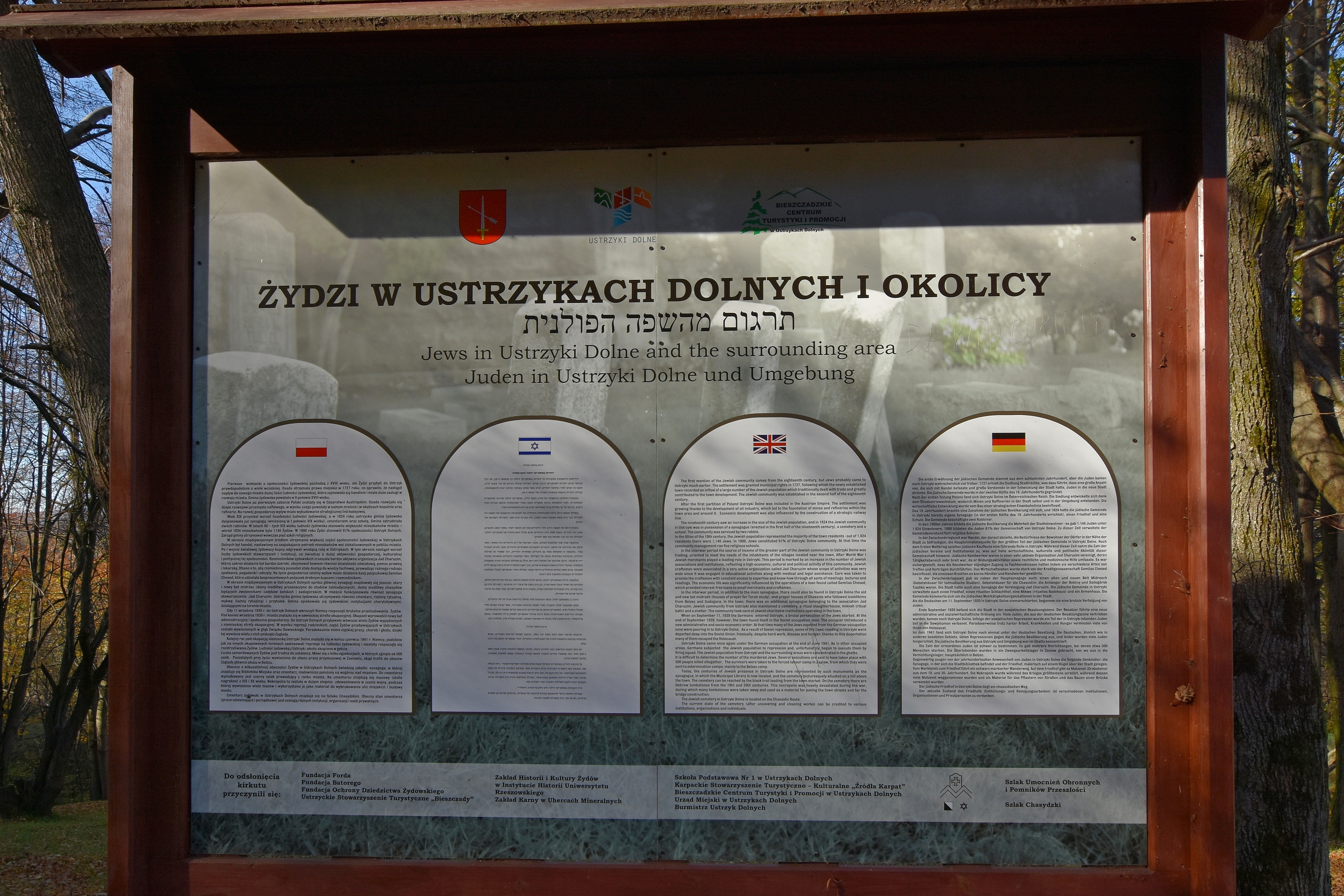
Information board in the southern part of the cemetery

The Jewish cemetery in Ustrzyki Dolne was likely established in the second half of the 18th century, although the exact year remains unknown.

The cemetery's establishment is closely linked to the significant growth of the local Jewish community. The first records of Jews living in Ustrzyki Dolne date back to the early 17th century, with a rapid expansion of Jewish settlement occurring in the latter half of the 19th century, following the construction of a railway connecting the town with Przemyśl, Košice, Jasło, Krosno, and Sanok. By 1900, Jews made up about 61% of the town's population. Initially, the Jewish community in Ustrzyki Dolne was under the jurisdiction of the Lesko qahal. Around 1777, a subsidiary qahal was established in Ustrzyki. The existence of an independent Jewish community in Ustrzyki Dolne is confirmed for the 1830s. It is unclear where the Jews of Ustrzyki Dolne buried their dead before the local cemetery was established. They may have used the cemetery in Lesko, but it's also possible that to avoid inconvenience and costs, the Ustrzyki cemetery was established earlier than presumed (before the second half of the 18th century), and burials took place there.

The cemetery was destroyed by the Germans during World War II. Some of the gravestones were repurposed for road paving and bridge construction. In 1993 and 1995, several gravestones that had been used this way were found during construction work in the town and were returned to the cemetery. During the war, the cemetery was also a site of mass burials of Jewish residents during the extermination of the local Jewish population, as well as a site of executions of escapees from transports to the Belzec extermination camp. These executions took place in January (24 people) and August (several people) of 1943.

Until Ustrzyki Dolne was returned to Poland in 1951 as part of an agreement with the Soviet Union, the cemetery, along with the entire town, was within Soviet borders. There is no detailed information on the fate of the cemetery during this period, though it is suspected that the remains of Jews exhumed from a mass grave in Brzegi Dolne might have been buried there. After World War II, the cemetery, neglected and without care, fell into decay and was largely forgotten.

== Contemporary state ==
As of the first decade of the 21st century, the condition of the Jewish cemetery in Ustrzyki Dolne is relatively good. However, it is overgrown with vegetation, which can periodically obstruct access to the site. The cemetery was inventoried in 2006 and has since been maintained by students from the local Gymnasium No. 1, who undertook cleanup efforts that same year.

The number of surviving gravestones varies according to different sources, ranging from about 20 to approximately 300. The oldest surviving gravestone dates back to the second half of the 18th century. While exact dates for the most recent gravestones are not provided, it is noted that the cemetery contains gravestones from the 20th century. Most of the gravestones are made of sandstone and bear inscriptions in Hebrew, oriented along an east-west axis. Some gravestones still show traces of original paint. It appears that the cemetery was not divided into specific sections or plots. The majority of the remaining gravestones are located in the northern part of the cemetery, near its eastern and western boundaries. Many of them are covered in moss and lichen, with some being damaged, illegible, cracked, or overturned, which complicates the reading of inscriptions.

In the fall of 2006, a trail was established leading from the town center to the Jewish cemetery, and a commemorative plaque was placed on the site.
