= Rentech =

- Type: Public
- Traded as: OTCQB: RTKH
- Industry: Wood; Fertilizers; Bioenergy
- Founded: 1981
- Founder: Charles Benham; Mark Bohn
- Headquarters: Los Angeles, California, United States
- Key people: Keith B. Forman (CEO, President, Director)
- Products: wood chips wood pellets nitrogen fertilizer
- Subsidiaries: Fulghum Fibres; New England Wood Pellet; Rentech Nitrogen Partners (~60%); Rentech Graanul (40%)
- Website: www.rentechinc.com

Rentech, Inc. (stands for Renewable Energy Technology) was a Los Angeles, California–based company that owned and operated wood fiber processing and nitrogen fertilizer manufacturing businesses. It provided wood chipping and wood pellet services through a subsidiary Fulghum Fibres, Inc. and sold nitrogen fertilizer through Rentech Nitrogen Partners, L.P. In addition, Rentech owned the intellectual property for a number of energy technologies, such as Rentech–SilvaGas Gasification Process and Fischer–Tropsch process based Rentech Process.

== Energy technologies ==
Rentech was initially formed in 1981 by Charles Benham and Mark Bohn to develop and commercialize synthetic fuel technologies. In 1991, it incensed its Rentech Process to the Fuel Resources Development Company (Fuelco) to produce diesel fuel from landfill gas at the Synhytech facility in Pueblo, Colorado. Rentech obtained ownership of the facility in 1993. This project failed and was closed at the same year due to lower than expected gas volumes.

In 2000, Rentech acquired a methanol plant at Commerce City, Colorado, which was converted to a gas-to-liquids plant. In mid 2000s, Rentech planned building coal-to-liquids plants in Wyoming, Illinois, Kentucky, and Mississippi.

In 2009, it unveiled plan for construction of a synthetic fuels plant in Rialto, California, and together with ASIG it agreed with 13 airlines to provide synthetic diesel for ground services at Los Angeles International Airport.

In 2010, it made a memorandum of understanding with 14 airlines to provide alternative jet fuel and diesel fuel from its planned biofuels production complex project in Natchez, Mississippi.

In 2011, Rentech agreed with the Government of Ontario to build a plant in White River, Ontario. to convert 1.3 million tons of provincial forests into jet fuel and naphtha. At the same year, it purchased the 55 MW biomass integrated gasification combined cycle power plant project in Port St. Joe, Florida. This project was halted 2012.

In 2013, Rentech changed its focus from biofuels to wood pellets production. It closed its product demonstration unit in Commerce City which was developing technology for conversion of cellulosic biomass into synthetic gas. It also cancelled its biofuels production complex project in Natchez.

In 2014, Rentech sold its energy technology and equipment located at the demonstration unit in Commerce City, Colorado to Chinese Sunshine Kaidi New Energy Group.

== Wood processing ==
In May 2013, Rentech acquired Georgia-based Fulghum Fibres, Inc. As part of the acquisition of Fulghum Fibres, Rentech entered into a joint venture with Estonia-based pellet manufacturer Graanul Invest to develop pellet plants in Canada and the United States.

In 2013, it also acquired wood processing facilities in Atikokan and Wawa, Ontario, which it is converting into of pellet factories. These facilities are contracted to supply Ontario Power Generation and Drax Power with pellets for power generation.

In May 2014, Rentech acquired New England Wood Pellets, considered to be the largest producer of wood pellets for the U.S. heating market. Established in 1992, New England Wood Pellet operates three wood pellet facilities, located in the U.S. Northeast, which is the largest domestic market for consumption of wood pellets for heating.

== Nitrogen fertilizers ==
Rentech entered into the nitrogen fertilizer business in 2006 when it acquired from Agrium an ammonia nitrogen fertilizer facility located in East Dubuque, Illinois.

In 2011, Rentech consolidated its nitrogen fertilizer business into subsidiary company Rentech Nitrogen Partners. At the same year, Rentech Nitrogen was listed at the New York Stock Exchange.

In 2012, Rentech acquired Agrifos LLC, which owns a synthetic granulated ammonium sulfate fertilizer plant in Pasadena, Texas.

== Legal troubles ==
As of Feb. 21, 2017, Rentech posted on their website that the board has decided to idle the Wawa facility due to equipment and operational issues that would require additional unbudgeted capital investment, also stated is the uncertainty of profitability of wood pellets for heating. Rentech stated in the announcement that idling the plant will allow Rentech to conserve liquidity as it formally explores strategic alternatives. Subsequently, as a result of this announcement, Rentech stock (RTK) dropped 44%, initiating legal action of investors. Currently Rentech is being investigated by Levi & Korsinsky, LLP, Holzer and Holzer, LLC, Bronstein, Gewirtz & Grossman, LLC, Goldbert Law PC, Rosen Law Firm, and Pomerantz Law Firm.
