= Anna Maria Brandel =

Swedish industrialist and merchant

Anna Maria Brandel (1725–1799), was a Swedish industrialist and merchant. After the death of her husband in 1754, she became the owner of his merchant company, as well as one of the biggest textile mills in Sweden.

== Life ==
=== Early life ===
She was the daughter of the merchant Samuel Schütz (1676–1740) of Gothenburg and Anna Maria Prunck and sister of Jacob Schütz (1709–1772), mayor of Gothenburg and director of the Swedish East India Company. In 1741, she married the Stockholm merchant Elias Brandel (1707–1754), and settled with him in Stockholm. Her spouse owned a sugar refinery on Blasieholmen, a cotton mill on Kungsholmen and as well as a big merchant company. Anna Maria Brandel was described as a very well educated and capable businesswoman and owned a library of about a hundred volumes in the Swedish, German, French and English language.

=== Business career ===
Upon the death of her spouse in 1754, she took over all of his business enterprises, and as such becoming a major business figure. She was also and active stockholder in various banks, and communicated with merchant companies in Amsterdam and London. In 1760, Brandel managed the largest import firm in Stockholm, importing coffee, sugar and salt. She managed the merchant company until 1772, and the cotton mill until 1784. She was most invested in the sugar refinery, which she expanded considerably and managed until her death, with her son as her partner from 1790. At her death, Brandel was the 10th highest-taxed real estate-owner in the capital, and one of only two women in the category of the 30 highest-taxed real estate-owners of Stockholm.

In the period of 1750–1820, she was one of the three richest women merchants in Stockholm, alongside Anna Maria Wretman and Christina Fris.
