= Mykhailo Dovbenko =

Ukrainian economist and politician

- Михайло Довбенко
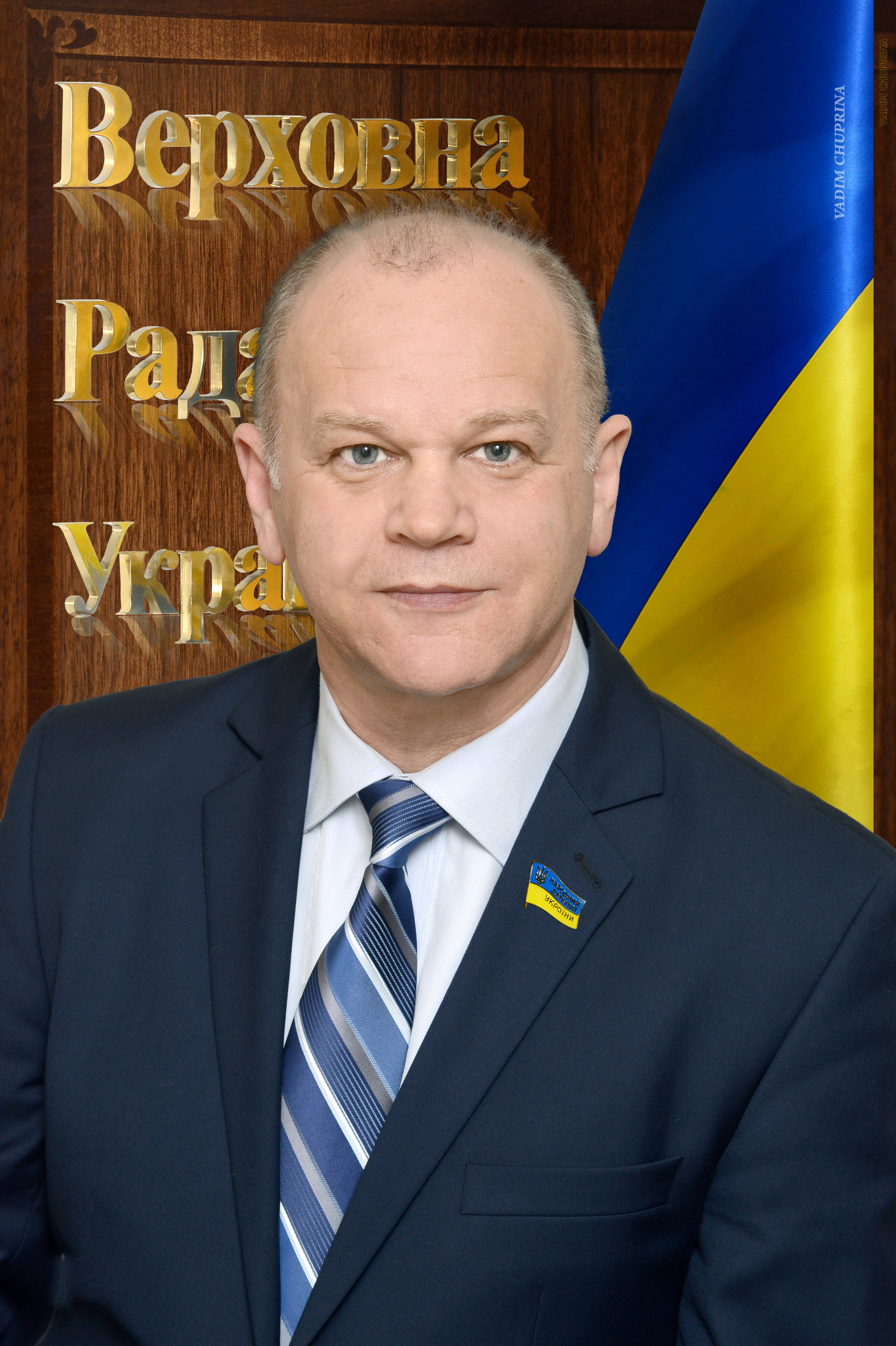
- Dovbenko in 2015

People's Deputy of Ukraine
- In office 27 November 2014 – 29 August 2019
- Preceded by: Volodymyr Kupchak
- Succeeded by: Ihor Fris
- Constituency: Ivano-Frankivsk Oblast, No. 84

Personal details
- Born: 31 October 1954 (age 71) Koropets, Ukrainian SSR, Soviet Union (now Ukraine)
- Party: Petro Poroshenko Bloc
- Education: Ternopil National Economic University

Mykhailo Volodymyrovych Dovbenko (Ukrainian: Михайло Володимирович Довбенко; born 31 October 1954) is a Ukrainian economist and politician who served as a People's Deputy of Ukraine in the 8th Ukrainian Verkhovna Rada, representing Ukraine's 84th electoral district.

== Education ==
Graduated from the Faculty of Planned Economy of Ternopil National Economic University, specialty "Agriculture Planning" (1976), post-graduate department of High School of Komsomol at Central Committee (CC). PhD (1989), Doctor of Economic Science (1998), Academician of Academy of Science of High School of Ukraine (2016).

== Work activity ==
- 1976–79 — junior scientist of the science-research sector, a teacher of the Economic Analysis Department of Ternopil Financial-Economic Institute, the main economist of Radcha village collective farm, Tysmenytsia District of Ivano-Frankivsk Oblast
- 1979–82 — the 1st secretary of Ivano-Frankivsk Regional Committee of Lenin's Communist Society of Youth of Ukraine (LCSYU)
- 1982–86 – the 1st secretary of Ivano-Frankivsk Oblast Committee of Lenin's Communist Society of Youth of Ukraine (LCSYU)
- 1986–89 – post-graduate student of High Society of Youth School at Central Committee of Lenin's Communist Society of Youth
- 1989–91 – the chairman of the Organizational Party Work of Ivano-Frankivsk Oblast Committee of Communist Party of Ukraine.
- 1991–93 – the main economist of currency transactions and foreign exchange transactions of Ivano-Frankivsk Director of JSCB "Ukraine"; Sector chairman, deputy of the chairman of the board"Zahidkoopbank", Ivano-Frankivsk;
- 1993–96 – the chairman of the boardof JSCB "Prut I K"; director of the affiliated institution Western Ukrainian Commercial Bank
- January 1997 – 2000 – Director of Vynnytsia affiliated institution of "Pravex-Bank", a Chief Manager of Kyiv JSCB "Ukraine" Board of Bank Directors
- 1999–2014 – a director of the Open Policy Institute;
- Author (co-author) of more than 150 scientific works, in particular, "Economic Encyclopedia" in III volumes (co-author); a book "Prominent Strangers", "Modern Economic Theory (Economic nobelelogia)" (translated into Russian, Kazakh), "The Crisis of Economy is not the crisis of Science".

== Party activity ==
- Was a manager of election campaign office of Perto Poroshenko in Ivano-Frankivsk Oblast at presidential elections in 2014.

November 27, 2014 – People's deputy of Ukraine of the VIIIth convocation, party "Petro Poroshenko Bloc"

- The 1st deputy of the chairman of the Verkhovna Rada of Ukraine Committee on Financial Policy and Banking.
- "Petro Poroshenko Bloc" party bloc, the head of Expert Rada "Petro Poroshenko Bloc" faction in the Verkhovna Rada of Ukraine.

In the 2019 Ukrainian parliamentary election Dovbenko failed as a candidate for European Solidarity in constituency 84 (in Ivano-Frankivsk Oblast) to get reelected to parliament. He lost this election with 12.88% of the vote to Ihor Fris (who won with 22,01% of the votes).

== Sports achievements ==
- Master of Sports of the USSR in rowing and canoeing (1975)

== Awards ==
Order of the Badge of Honour (1986).
