= Graanul Invest =

Company based in Estonia

AS Graanul Invest
- Type: Private
- Industry: Manufacturing
- Founded: 2003
- Headquarters: Tallinn, Estonia
- Products: Wood pellets
- Revenue: €278 million (2017)
- Net income: €17.7 million (2017)
- Owner: Apollo Funds
- Number of employees: 418 (2017)
- Subsidiaries: Pelletiküte AS; Valga Puu AS; Karo Mets AS; Roger Puit AS; SIA Latgran; Graanul Pellets SIA; Graanul Invest SIA; Imavere Shipping Company Limited
- Website: www.graanulinvest.com

AS Graanul Invest is a wood pellet producer located in Tallinn, Estonia. It is the Europe's biggest wood pellets producer. The company is majority owned by Apollo funds.

== History ==
Graanul Invest was founded in 2003.

In 2013, Graanul Invest entered into a joint venture agreement with Fulghum Fibres and later Rentech Inc. to create a wood pellet manufacturer Rentech Graanul for pellets production in Canada and the United States. After insolvency of Rentech this joint venture discontinued.

In 2015, Graanul Invest bought from the Swedish companies BillerudKorsnäs AB and Baltic Resources AB the Latvian biggest pellets producer SIA Latgran. In 2017, Graanul Invest acquired from German Pellets the Langerlo coal power plant in Belgium. The company planned to convert the plant to be fed by wood pellets. However, the project failed as the company did not secure renewable energy subsidies from Flemish authorities.

In 2018, Graanul Invest announced that it will build in cooperation with the American biotech company Sweetwater Energy a wood fractionation plant to produce different sugars and lignin by using the Sunburst fractionating technology. In October 2018, Graanul Invest sold 10 pellet-fueled boiler houses to Adven Eesti.

In 2018, Graanul Invest bought the bulk carrier M/V Nord Shanghai (now: M/V Imavere) from the Danish shipping company D/S Norden, and in 2019 the bulk carrier M/V Nord Mumbai .

In 2019, Graanul Invest re-entered into the United States market by acquiring Texas Pellets' assets from insolvent German Pellets.

== Operations ==
Graanul Invest owns 11 wood pellet plants in Estonia, Latvia, and Lithuania. In 2017, it produced 1.656 million tonnes of pellets. Its main export markets for pellets are the United kingdom, Denmark, Sweden, and Italy.
