= Kaidi Finland =

Finnish Energy company

Sunshine Kaidi (Finland) New Energy Co. Oy
- Company type: Subsidiary
- Industry: Energy Industry
- Founded: 2016
- Headquarters: Espoo, Finland
- Products: Renewable fuels
- Parent: Sunshine Kaidi New Energy Group
- Website: www.kaidi.fi

Sunshine Kaidi (Finland) New Energy Co. Oy (Kaidi Finland) is an energy company that plans to build a biofuel refinery in Kemi, Finland. It is a subsidiary of the Chinese energy company Sunshine Kaidi New Energy Group. The refinery would use second generation biofuel technology. Its investment value is around one billion euros.

== Kemi biofuel refinery ==
The biofuel refinery in Kemi would generate approximately 200,000 metric tons of biofuel, of which 75% would be biodiesel and 25% biofuel. The feedstock used in the refinery would be mainly energy wood along with crop residues and surplus materials from the forest industry.

The refinery’s yearly demand for wood would be 2 million cubic tons of energy wood. There is a total of 120,000 hectares of forest in need of first felling within a 200 kilometer range of Kemi. An amount of 20 million cubic meters of energy wood can be harvested from it yearly. Currently, approximately 6 million cubic meters of wood is left over in the woods every year. Kaidi Finland has reported that it may also procure energy wood from Sweden.

The effect the refinery would have on employment in Kemi is notable. The building process would bring 4,000 person-years’ worth of labor to the area. When the refinery is completed, it would employ 150 persons full-time while bringing hundreds of jobs to local subcontractors and energy wood providers. The domestic content of the project is estimated to be around 50 percent. Kaidi will make the final decision regarding the investment during 2016.

== Technology ==
The planned refinery in Ajos, Kemi would use second generation biofuel technology, such as plasma gasification, syngas cleanup and the Fischer-Tropsch process. Plasma gasification involves heating the processed material to a notably higher temperature than in other gasification methods, making it more suitable for the processing of demanding materials, such as wood. The process increases the efficiency of the feedstock.

The Fischer-Tropsch process is a catalytic chemical reaction, where carbon monoxide and hydrogen are transformed into liquid hydrocarbons. The catalysts are iron and cobalt based and speed up the chemical reaction in certain temperatures. The primary function of the process is to produce a synthetic oil replacement to be used as a synthetic lubricant or fuel. The process was invented by Franz Fischer and Hans Tropsch in the 1920s as a way of producing liquid fuel.

Second generation biofuels refer to fuels that use municipal solid waste and materials high in lignocellulose content in their production.

== Project ==
Kaidi first began planning the biofuel refinery in 2014 after the previous project by Vapo and Metsä Group was discontinued. Vapo and Metsä Group had planned to build a similar refinery in Ajos. This means that the city of Kemi is already well prepared for the planned refinery and has advanced the required permit applications.

In 2016, Kaidi Finland planned to finalize the permit applications along with the design and modeling of the refinery. The building project would start in 2017 and the refinery would begin producing biofuel for commercial markets in 2019. In Oct 2016, Kaidi Finland signed a contract with the city of Kemi to acquire a 32 hectare land area for the planned biofuel refinery.

The project was put on hold until EU Renewable Energy Directive is implemented in Finnish law, which may happen 2020 or later.

As of March 2022, Kaidi Finland still planned to build a biofuel refinery, however the project was still pending.

In November 2024, the European demo-plant database demoplants21 updates the Kemi biorefinery’s status to “cancelled”; projected start-up (originally 2019) is removed.

== See also ==
- Energy in Finland
