= Sunshine Kaidi =

Chinese renewable energy company

Sunshine Kaidi New Energy Group Co. Ltd.
- Company type: Private
- Industry: Energy Industry
- Founded: 1992
- Headquarters: Wuhan, Hubei, China
- Key people: Chen Yilong (CEO)
- Products: Renewable fuels
- Parent: Sunshine Kaidi New Energy Group
- Subsidiaries: Kaidi Ecological and Environmental Technology Co. Ltd. Alter NRG Corporation; Westinghouse Plasma Corporation; Sunshine Kaidi (Finland) New Energy Co. Oy

Sunshine Kaidi New Energy Group Co. Ltd. (Sunshine Kaidi, former name: Wuhan Kaidi Holding Investment Co., Ltd.) is a Chinese holding company. It is one of the largest bioenergy companies in China. The company is privately owned with the controlling stake belonging to Chen Yilong. Its subsidiary Kaidi Ecological and Environmental Technology Co. Ltd. in which Sunshine Kaidi owns a 29.08% stake, is listed in the Shenzhen stock market, but the trading is suspended.

== History ==
The company was formed in 1992.

In 2014, Kaidi acquired biofuel technology and equipment from American company Rentech. In 2015, it acquired Calgary-based plasma gasification company Alter NRG.

Since 2018, the company has become visibly strained by its debt load with its subsidiary Kaidi Ecological and Environmental Technology Co. Ltd. defaulting on a bond.

== Markets ==
The company is active in 24 Chinese provinces and Vietnam.

The company has had plans to expand to European markets with its main investment being a refinery in Kemi, Finland under its Finnish subsidiary.
