= Christina Fris =

Swedish industrialist and merchant

Christina Fris (1757–1835), was a Swedish industrialist and merchant. After the death of her husband in 1808, she became the owner of his merchant company, as well as one of the biggest tobacco factories in Sweden.

== Life ==
=== Early life ===
She was the daughter of the tobacco factory owner Anders Nordström and Maria Elisabeth Söderman, and in 1777 married the merchant Carl Magnus Fris (1743–1808), son of the Anna Dimander (d. 1792), who inherited a tobacco firm from her second husband. Her sister Maria married her husband's brother Petter Frisson Dimander (d. 1789).

In 1792, the tobacco company Anna Dimander & son was formed when the tobacco factory her husband inherited from his mother; the tobacco factory her sister-in-law inherited from her mother; and the tobacco factory she and her sister Maria Frisson Dimander jointly inherited from their father, was joined in the same company to the biggest tobacco firm in Sweden.

=== Business career ===
At the death of her spouse in 1808, Christina Fris inherited a fortune, as well as one 5th of the tobacco firm together with her son Gustaf Adolf, her sister-in-law's husband Johan Bucht and son Carl, her own sister Maria Frisson Dimander and her sons Anders and Carl. At this point, the firm was managed by her brother-in-law Johan Bucht, the only adult male. When Johan Bucht died in 1812, however, the three women took over one 3rd each of the tobacco firm (excluding their sons). That three women managed a business company of this size was highly unusual and almost unique for the period: Anna Elisabeth Wetterling and her sisters, who managed a merchant company in Gothenburg in the 1770s, is the perhaps only other example in Sweden prior to this. Christina Fris, Maria Frisson Dimander and Maria Christina Bucht managed the firm together for sixteen years until Christina Fris took over as sole active manager in 1828. The firm was dissolved in 1832.

In addition to the tobacco firm, Christina Fris also managed the merchant company of her late spouse until her death, through which she sold the products of her sawmill and ironworks.

In the period of 1750–1820, she was one of the three richest women merchants in Stockholm, alongside Anna Maria Wretman and Anna Maria Brandel.
