= Barbara Fris =

Canadian opera singer

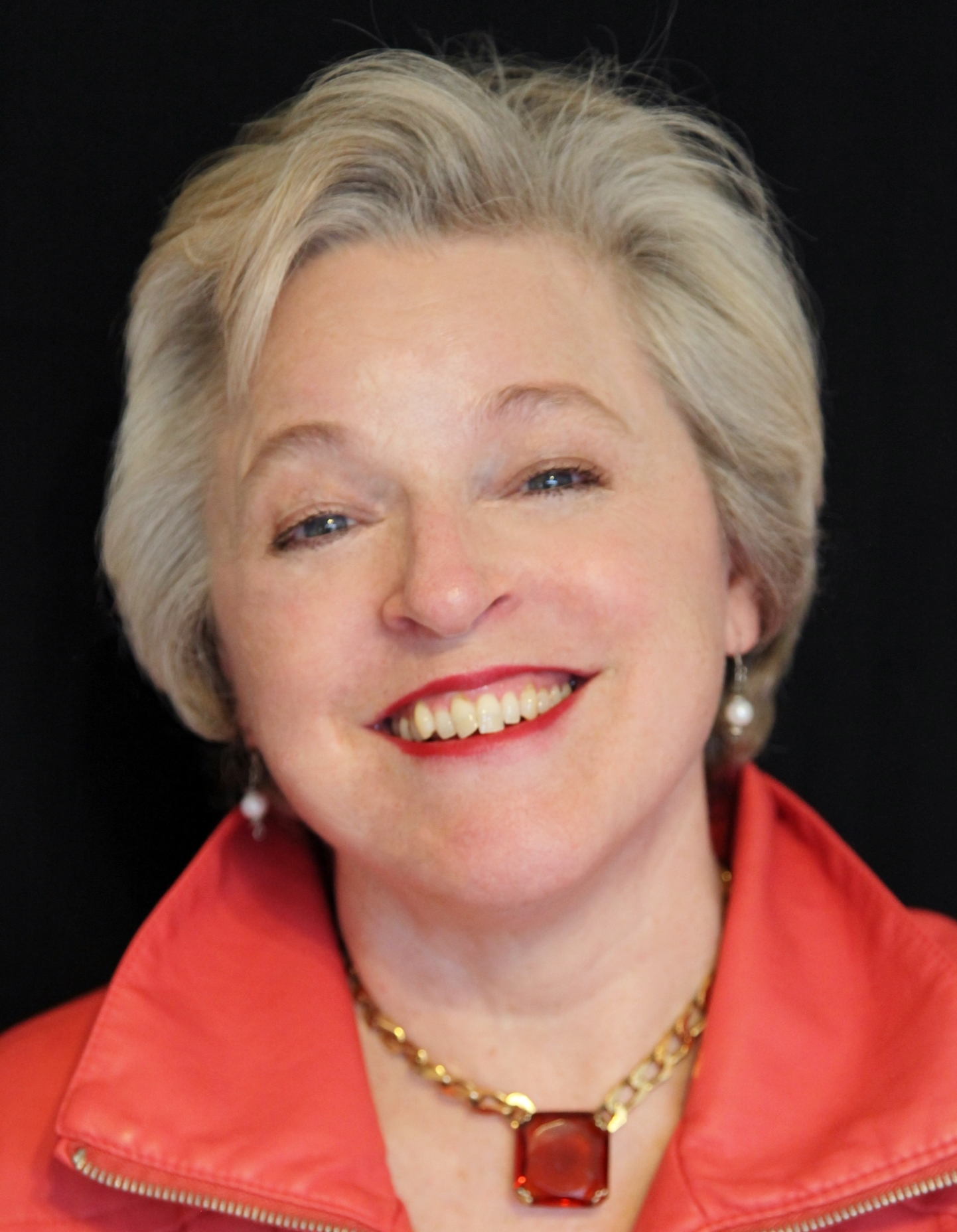
- Portrait of Barbara Fris, Canadian Soprano
- Born: May 10, 1956 (age 70); Halifax, Nova Scotia, Canada
- Musical career
- Genres: opera, classical
- Occupations: Singer, actress, entertainer
- Years active: 1974–present
- Website: Barbara Fris website

Barbara Fris (born May 10, 1956) is a Canadian soprano and actress who performs as an opera singer, concert artist, and recitalist. She specializes in opera and classical symphonic works for voice, having performed across Canada, in Europe and the United States where she also has sung a wide range of works that include operettas, musical theatre, light classics, lieder, French mélodie, and art songs.

== Early years ==
Fris was born in Halifax, Nova Scotia, and began her musical studies at the Nova Scotia Teacher's College (Truro), where she obtained an Associate of Education Diploma and Licentiate as an Early Childhood Music Specialist (1977). She later graduated from Dalhousie University, Faculty of Music (1980) with a Bachelor of Music in Performance (Honours) and the University of Toronto Opera Division (1983), where she obtained a Diploma in Opera Performance (Honours) as a scholarship student of the noted Dutch baritone, Bernard Diamant and with the support of the Nova Scotia Talent Trust and Canada Council. Ms. Fris completed further post-graduate work at the Accademia dei Rozzi, (Siena Italy) under Maestro Walter Baracchi, former principal coach and conductor at Teatro alla Scala di Milano. Subsequent musical studies led her to New York City where she studied privately with Rita Patané of the Manhattan and Juilliard Schools of Music in Patané's Carnegie Hall studio. Fris later worked with Féderico Dávia of the Metropolitan Opera and Donna Brunsma, Assistant Conductor at the Chicago Lyric Opera. Since her memorable beginnings, she has mastered a large repertoire from the classics of opera and oratorio to the art songs of French, German, British and American composers, and a great treasury of contemporary popular music.

== Career highlights ==
Mimi in La bohème marked the singer's opera début at the Courtney Summer Music Festival (1982). Her professional career and main-stage opera début was launched in 1984 with her portrayal of Clorinda (La Cenerentola) with the Calgary Opera. Re-engagements with the Calgary Opera and guest appearances with the Manitoba Opera and Edmonton Opera followed.

Fris first attracted national attention when she was chosen as a Canadian winner and international finalist in the 3rd Annual International Luciano Pavarotti Voice Competition (Philadelphia Opera) in 1988. The following year, Fris was awarded the Grand Prize at the International Bel Canto Foundation Voice Competition (Chicago, Illinois), resulting in engagements for U.S. audiences in Chicago, Illinois, Philadelphia, and New York City. Her Italian début as Amelia Grimaldi (Simon Boccanegra) at the Teatro dei Rozzi, Siena, Italy and re-engagements at the Luino Italia Summer Music Festival as Fiordiligi (Così fan tutte) followed. In 1990, Fris performed the world-premiere of Canadian composer Patricia Blomfield Holt's "A Song of Darkness and Light". Since then, Barbara Fris has gone on to become one of Canada's most versatile lyrico-spinto sopranos active today, with her portrayals of opera heroines, her concert performances and recitals.

Fris has appeared on most of the major opera stages throughout Canada, including the Canadian Opera Company, Calgary Opera, Edmonton Opera, Opera Theatre of Alberta, and Manitoba Opera. On the concert stage, her stage presence and vocal beauty have joined with orchestral ensembles across Canada in a wide array of oratorio and concert repertoire. Fris has performed in Calgary, Chicago, Edmonton, Halifax, Luino (Italy), Montreal, New York, Philadelphia, Siena (Italy), Toronto and Winnipeg, among other cities.

Roles she has played include Liù in Turandot, Norina in Don Pasquale, Zerlina and Donna Elvira in Don Giovanni, Pamina in Die Zauberflöte, Fiordiligi in Così fan tutte, Cio-Cio-San in Madama Butterfly, Angelica in Suor Angelica, Leïla in Les pêcheurs de perles, Violetta in La traviata, Marguerite in Faust, the Countess in The Marriage of Figaro, Amelia Grimaldi (Maria Boccanegra) in Simon Boccanegra, Marenka in The Bartered Bride, The Mother in Amahl and the Night Visitors, and Mimi and Musetta in La bohème. Her vast opera repertoire also includes Nedda in Pagliacci, Donna Anna in Don Giovanni, Lauretta in Gianni Schicchi, Despina in Così fan tutte, Susanna in The Marriage of Figaro, Micaëla in Carmen, Antonia in Les contes d'Hoffmann, Elsa in Lohengrin, the title role in Tosca, Elisabetta in Don Carlos, and Desdemona in Otello. Fris is also known for her portrayals of Angelina in Trial by Jury, Mabel in Pirates of Penzance, the title role in Giuditta, and Hanna Glawari in The Merry Widow, always to critical and audience acclaim.

Barbara Fris has been praised by the Edmonton Journal which wrote "…sings with a sensuous warmth, great reserves of power and emotional expressiveness." The Chronicle Herald added "Ms. Fris possesses a gorgeous vocal instrument with illuminating beauty of tone … a songstress that marries her expressive lyricism with exemplary diction and compelling acting."

She has given a Royal Command Performance for Queen Elizabeth II and Prince Philip, Duke of Edinburgh at the opening of Science North (Sudbury) and, as Guest Artist at the 'International Year of the Senior Citizen' event sponsored by the City of Toronto government, her outdoor concert attracted a capacity crowd at Nathan Phillips Square where some 15,000+ listeners heard her critically acclaimed Mimi from La Bohème.

The CBC has broadcast Fris' performances in concerts, with festivals and regional orchestras across Canada, nationally in radio and television. Her other television credits include appearances on CTV, CITY and Global networks in their nationally broadcast news features. Most of her recorded works are found in the archives of the various companies she has performed with that, unfortunately, pre-date the now widely used digital recording format. While her discography is limited, some of her more recent live performances have emerged on CD.

In 2008, Fris was declared "one of Toronto's most artistic, creative and inspiring women" by Toronto's Luminato Festival, an honour previously given to former Governor-General of Canada Adrienne Clarkson, actor Cynthia Dale and journalist Valerie Pringle.

A resident of Toronto, Ontario, Canada, Barbara Fris continues to devote her experience and expertise to organizing and appearing at further concerts and galas to raise funds for various charitable organizations including the Canadian and American Red Cross, Doctors Without Borders/Médecins Sans Frontières, Adsum House for Women & Children (Halifax) and the Toronto Heliconian Club for Women. In addition to her performing activities, she maintains a large, private voice studio and is in demand as a vocal clinician, performance coach, and for her masterclasses.

== Awards and recognition ==
She was awarded the Grand Prize at the 1989 International Bel Canto Voice Competition in Chicago and has been a prizewinner at other competitions including the Luciano Pavarotti Competition in Philadelphia, the Metropolitan Opera National Council Auditions (Great Lakes District) in Toronto and the MacAllister Voice Competition in Indianapolis. She is also a recipient of several prestigious Canada Council and Nova Scotia Talent Trust Awards and the Arnold Walter and Canadian Opera Company Women's Guild Scholarships.

== Selected discography ==
- Mondnacht. Private label, 2005. Live performance
- My Heart Speaks for You: Mozart heroines in his 250th year. Private label, 2006. Live performance
