= German Pellets =

German Pellets GmbH
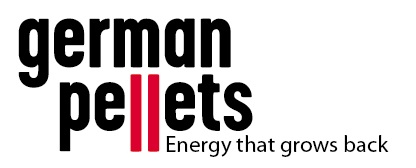
- Company type: Limited liability company (GmbH)
- Industry: Manufacturing
- Founded: 2005
- Headquarters: Wismar, Germany
- Key people: Peter H. Leibold (managing director)
- Products: Wood pellets
- Revenue: €519 million (2012)
- Number of employees: Around 650 (07/2013)
- Website: www.german-pellets.de/en.html

German Pellets GmbH is an insolvent German wood pellets production company based in Wismar, Germany. The company produced various kinds of wood pellets for pellet heating and pellet ovens, industrial pellets for large combustion systems, and animal hygiene products for horses, large and small animals.

The company operated worldwide, with a particular focus on Denmark, Italy, and the United Kingdom. As of August 2013, it had 19 production sites in Germany, Austria and the United States, with a yearly output of 2.2 million tons per year. It was the largest manufacturer and distributor of wood pellets in Europe and claimed to be the world's largest.

The company was owned by Peter Leibold (60%) and Anne Leibold (40%).

== History ==
German Pellets was founded in 2005 by Peter Leibold and its first plant constructed in Wismar.

FireStixx Holz-Energie GmbH was acquired by German Pellets group in 2011. On 1 January 2012, Glechner GmbH was acquired by German Pellets group.

Before declaring insolvency, German Pellets bought from E.ON the Langerlo coal power plant in Belgium. The plant was resold three days later to the Leibold's family linked company. In 2017, the plant was sold to another pellets producer Graanul Invest.

On 10 February 2016, German Pellets filed for insolvency in self-administration.

== Operations ==
German Pellets produced wood pellets of different qualities for pellet heating and pellet ovens, for industry boiler plants, for heat supply of house building, industry, business, municipality and for combined heat and power stations.

== Subsidiaries ==
German Pellets had several subsidiaries, including an Austrian subsidiary and one that offers its pellets as a green investment trading vehicle. The German Horse Pellets GmbH, the German Pellets Wärme GmbH, the German Pellets Genussrechte GmbH, the FireStixx Holz-Energie GmbH and the Austrian Hot'ts/Glechner-Gruppe are belonging to the German Pellets group.

Founded in 2008 the German Horse Pellets GmbH is specialised to the development and sale of animal hygiene products. The production of woodchips, granules and pellets for horses, large and small animals take place at the production sites Wismar (Mecklenburg-West Pomerania) and Wilburgstetten (Bavaria). All products are based on natural raw materials and manufactured without supplementing additives.

The German Pellets Wärme GmbH offers full packages of warmth. They are planning, building and financing all measures, which are necessary for renovation, installation or building of pellet heating plants.

The pellet producer offers investment vehicles via the German Pellets Genussrechte GmbH. It was founded in 2010. Wooden pellets as a financial investment have become part of green investments or ethical investments.

FireStixx Holz-Energie GmbH concentrated on the commerce and production of wood pellets. They have a network of pellet dealers and producers.

Glechner GmbH had several production sites in Austria. Since 1996, they have been producing and selling wood pellets.

Italian operating subsidiary; founded 2012, acquired Ely S.p.A. in December 2012.
