= Ustrzyki Dolne =

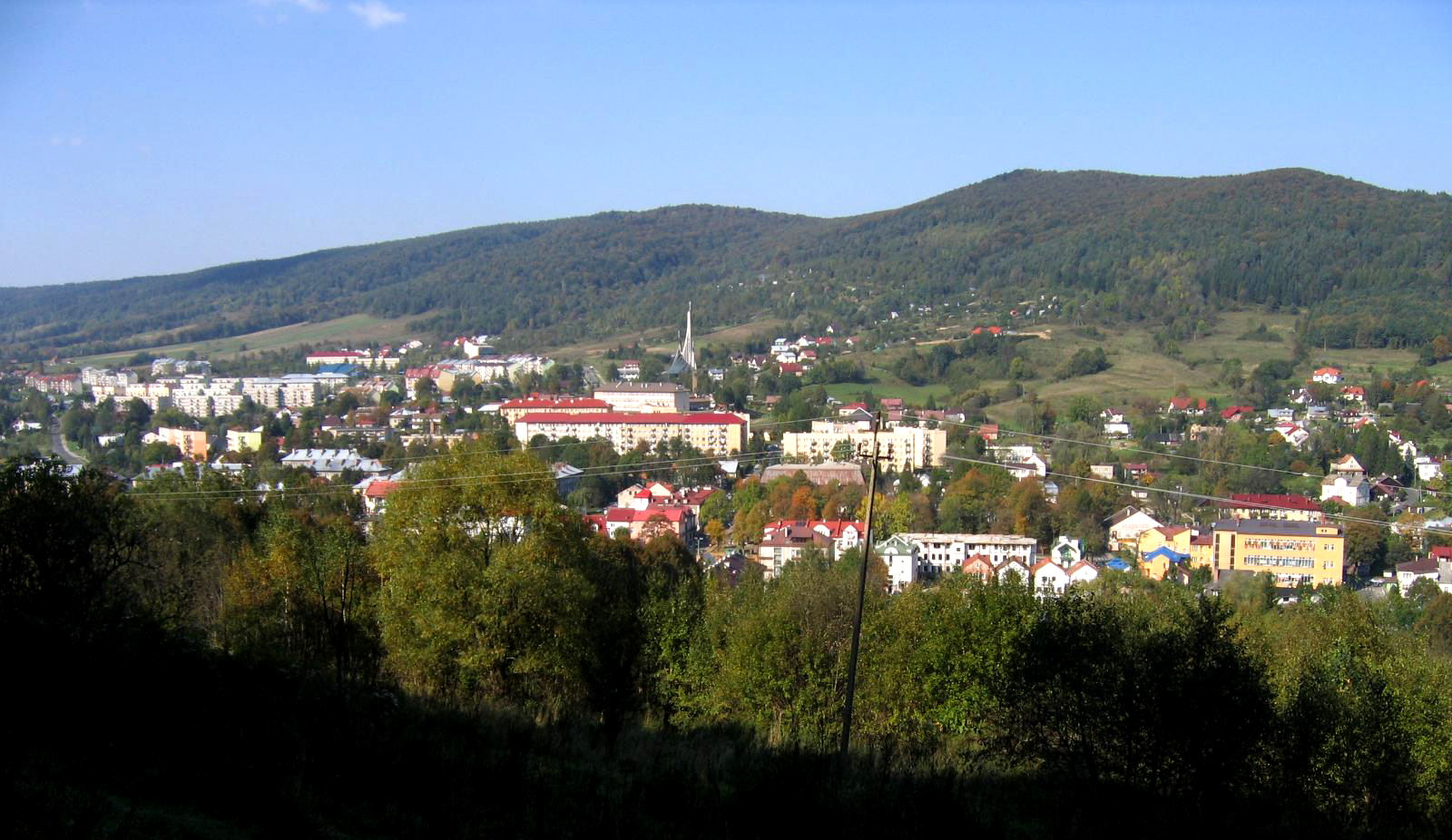
- Ustrzyki Dolne panorama

- Coat of arms
- Interactive map of Ustrzyki Dolne
- Location within Poland
- Coordinates: 49°25′47″N 22°35′12″E
- Country: Poland
- Voivodeship: Subcarpathian
- County: Bieszczady
- Gmina: Ustrzyki Dolne
- Established: 16th century
- Town rights: 1727

Government
  - Mayor: Michał Wnuk

Area
  - Total: 16.79 km^{2} (6.48 sq mi)
- Elevation: 480 m (1,570 ft)

Population (2006)
  - Total: 9,478
  - Density: 564.5/km^{2} (1,462/sq mi)
- Time zone: UTC+1 (CET)
  - Summer (DST): UTC+2 (CEST)
- Postal code: 38-700 to 38-714
- Area code: +48 13
- Car plates: RBI
- Website: Official website

Ustrzyki Dolne (Note: pronounced [usˈtʂɨkʲi ˈdɔlnɛ]; Yiddish: Istrik, Ukrainian: Устри́ки-Долі́шні, romanized: Ustrýky-Dolíshni) is a town in south-eastern Poland, situated in the Subcarpathian Voivodeship (since 1999) close to the border with Ukraine. It is the capital of Bieszczady County, with 9,383 inhabitants (02.06.2009).

In existence since the 15th century, Ustrzyki received its city charter around 1727. During the First Partition of Poland, in 1772 it became part of the Habsburg monarchy where it remained until 1918. After the defeat of Austria-Hungary Ustrzyki became part of the newly independent Poland. Major growth of the Ustrzyki economy began in the 19th century, when a railway connection to Przemyśl and Sanok was built in 1872, and the exploitation of local oil fields began. Temporarily in the USSR after the Vistula–Oder Offensive in 1944–45, it became part of postwar Poland following the 1951 Polish-Soviet territorial exchange.

The word Dolne means Lower. There exists a village Ustrzyki Górne - Upper.

== Timeline of history ==
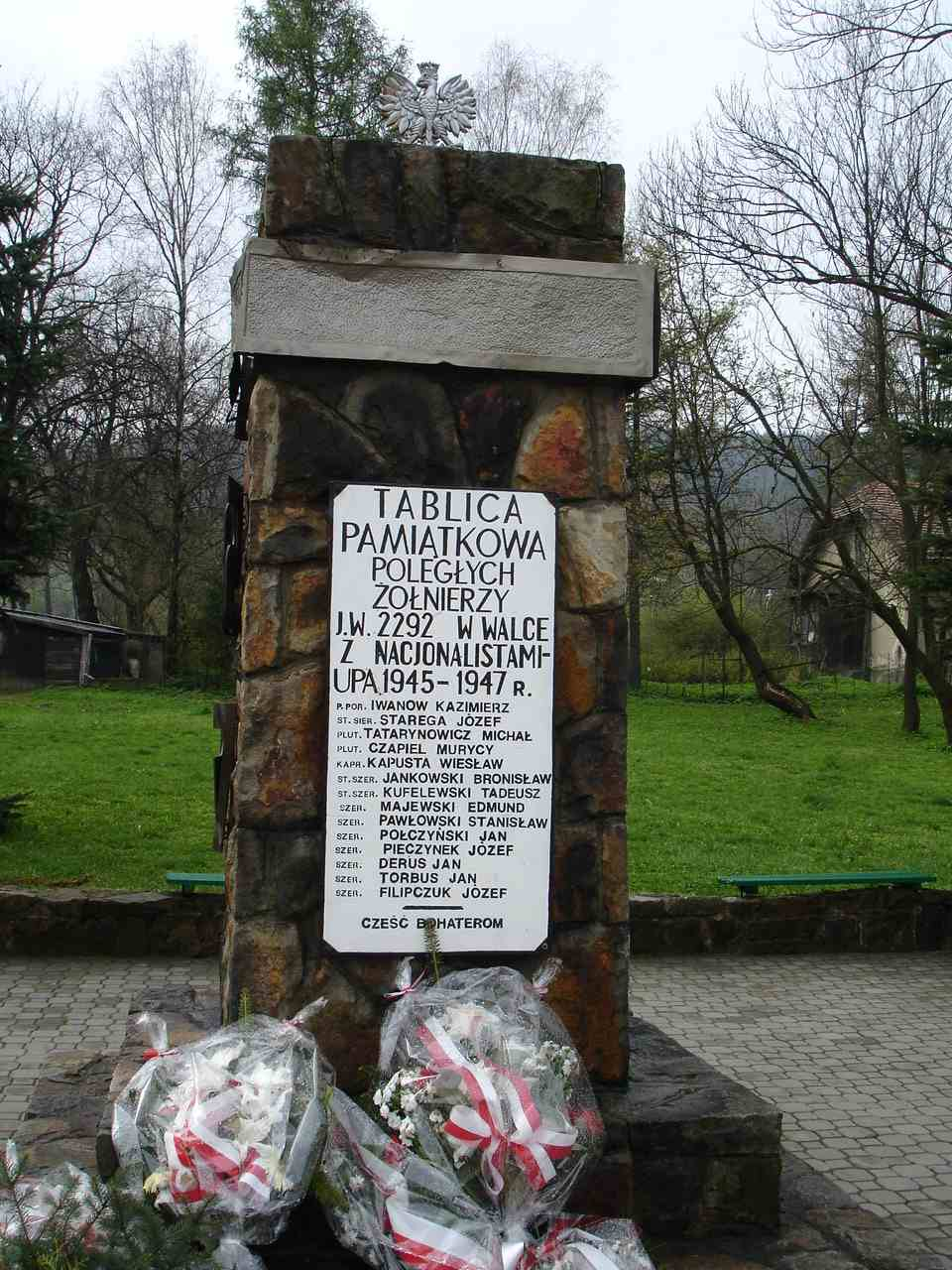
Monument to soldiers who died in a fight against the UPA in World War II

- 1497, Foundation of Ustrzyki Dolne as a royal village of the Polish Crown in the district Przemyśl
- 1723, Old town is built. First Jews appear in the town
- 1772, Ustrzyki Dolne together with Galicia becomes part of the Austrian Empire
- 1800–1850, Ustrzyki Dolne is part of the district Sanok (Königreich Galizien)
- 1850–1918, Ustrzyki Dolne is part of the district Lisko
- During World War I, Ustrzyki Dolne was occupied for six months by the Russian army and in 1918 for two months by Ukrainian troops.
- 1919–1939, Ustrzyki Dolne is part of the Lwów Voivodeship. On 1 January 1939 in city lived 4,300 residents (550 Ukrainians, 1,150 Polish people, 2,600 Jews).
- 1939 September, Occupation by German troops. 100 Jews are killed. Soon transferred to Soviet Union as part of the Molotov–Ribbentrop Pact
- 1939–1941, Soviet annexation. Part of the Drohobych Oblast
- 1941–1944, German occupation. The city is initially taken by Slovak troops and transferred under the German administration. Jewish population is killed in the town or deported to Belzec where they are immediately gassed. Probably only ten or fewer of Ustrzyki Dolne's prewar Jewish population survived the war.
- 1944–1951, Soviet administration. Part of the Drohobych Oblast
- 1951–1974, As part of a land swap with the Soviet Union, Ustrzyki Dolne becomes Polish again and is part of the province Rzeszów.
- 1974–1998, Ustrzyki Dolne becomes part of the Krosno Voivodeship.
- 1998, Ustrzyki Dolne becomes part of the Subcarpathian Voivodeship (capital Rzeszów)

== Points of interest ==
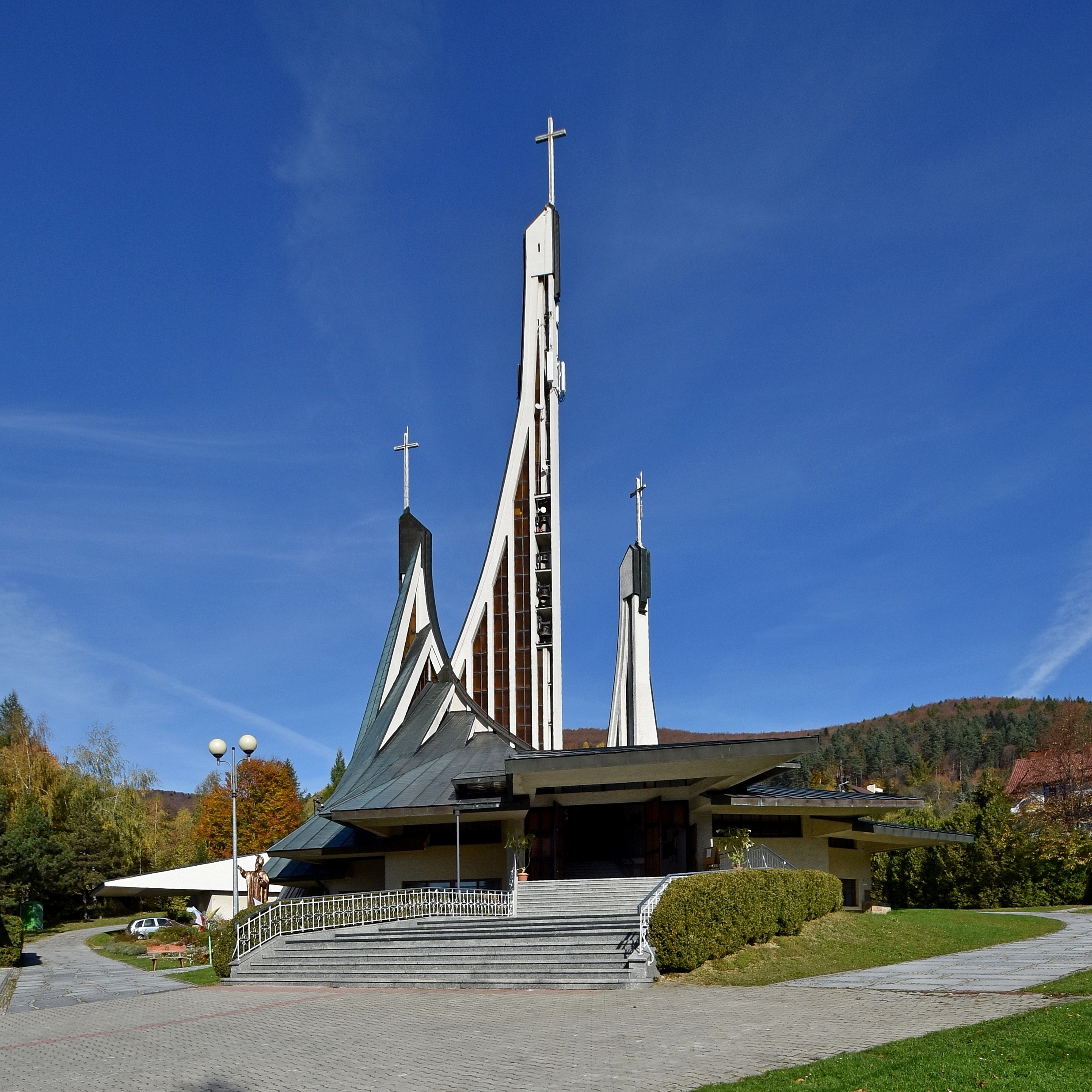
Church of Saint Joseph

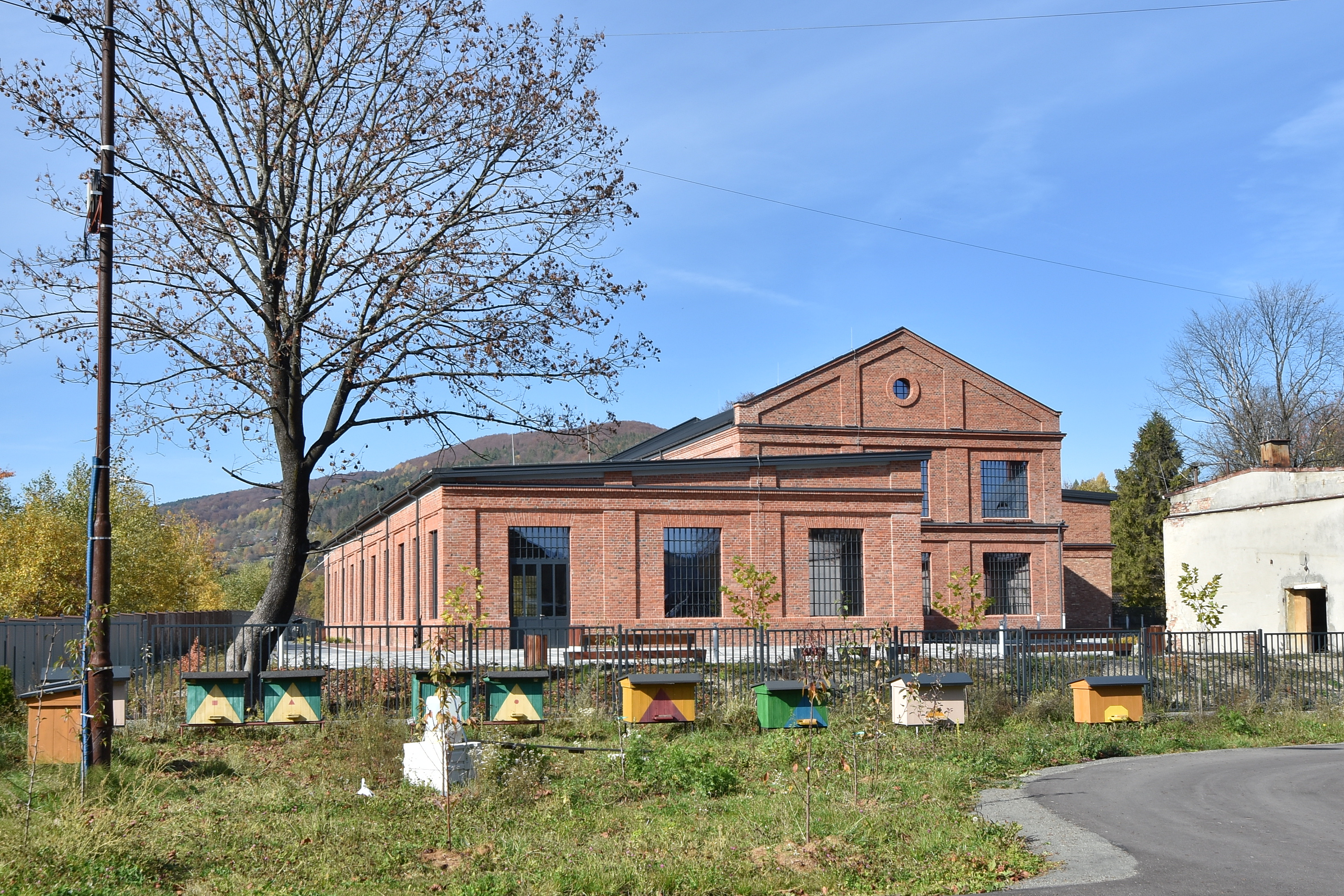
Historic "Fanto" oil refinary building

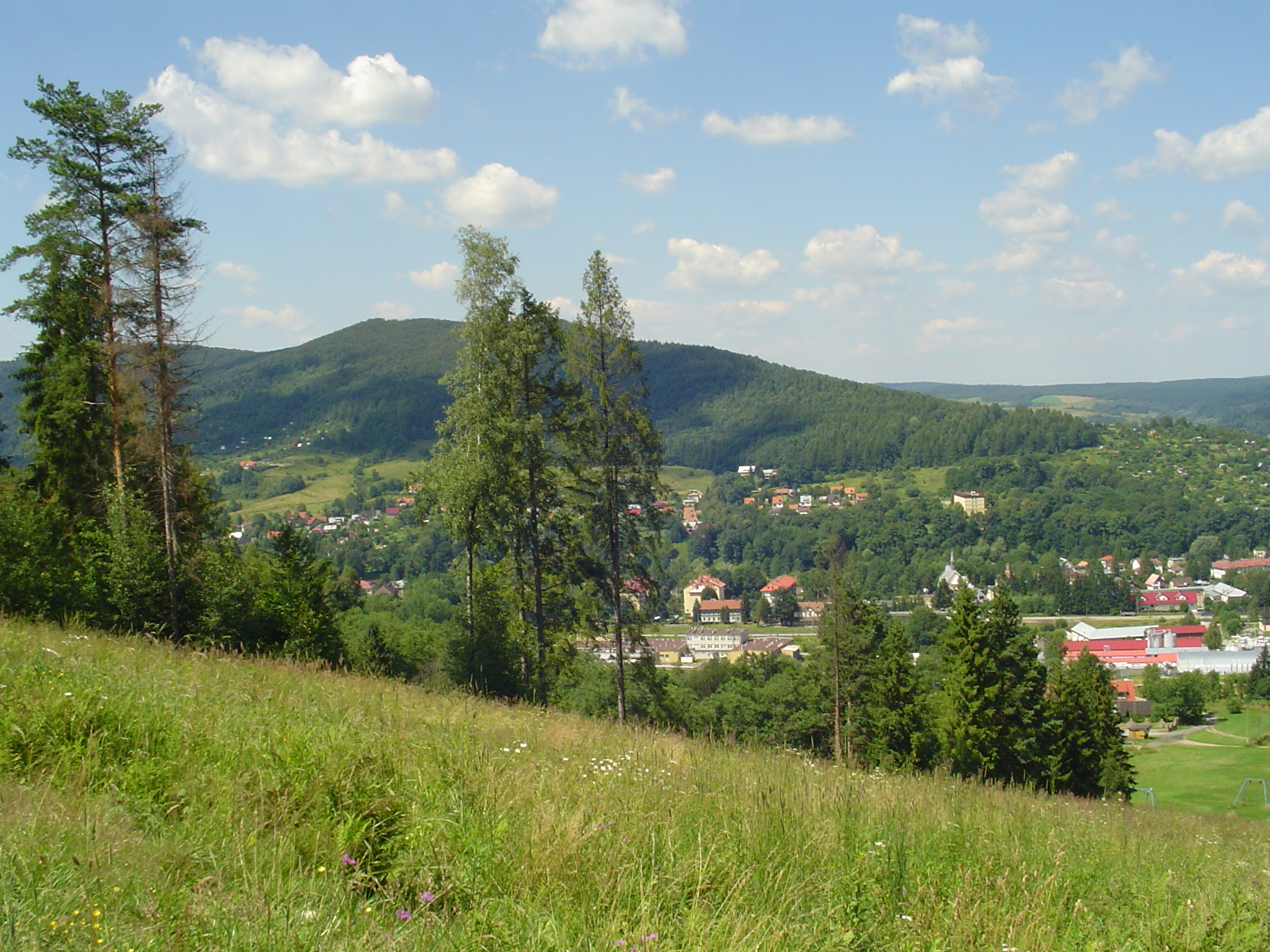
Ustrzyki seen from Gromadzyń

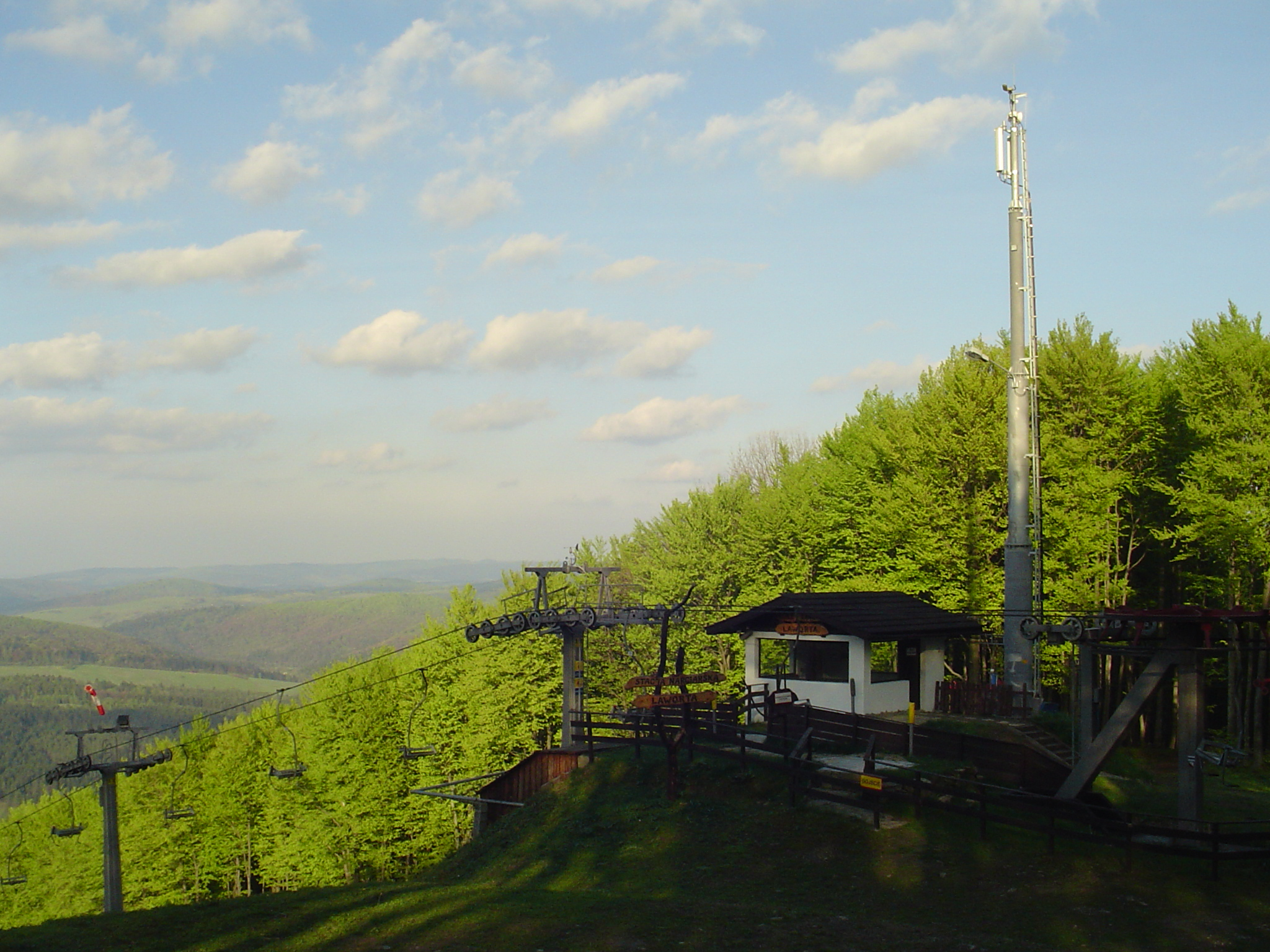
Ski Lift Station at Laworta

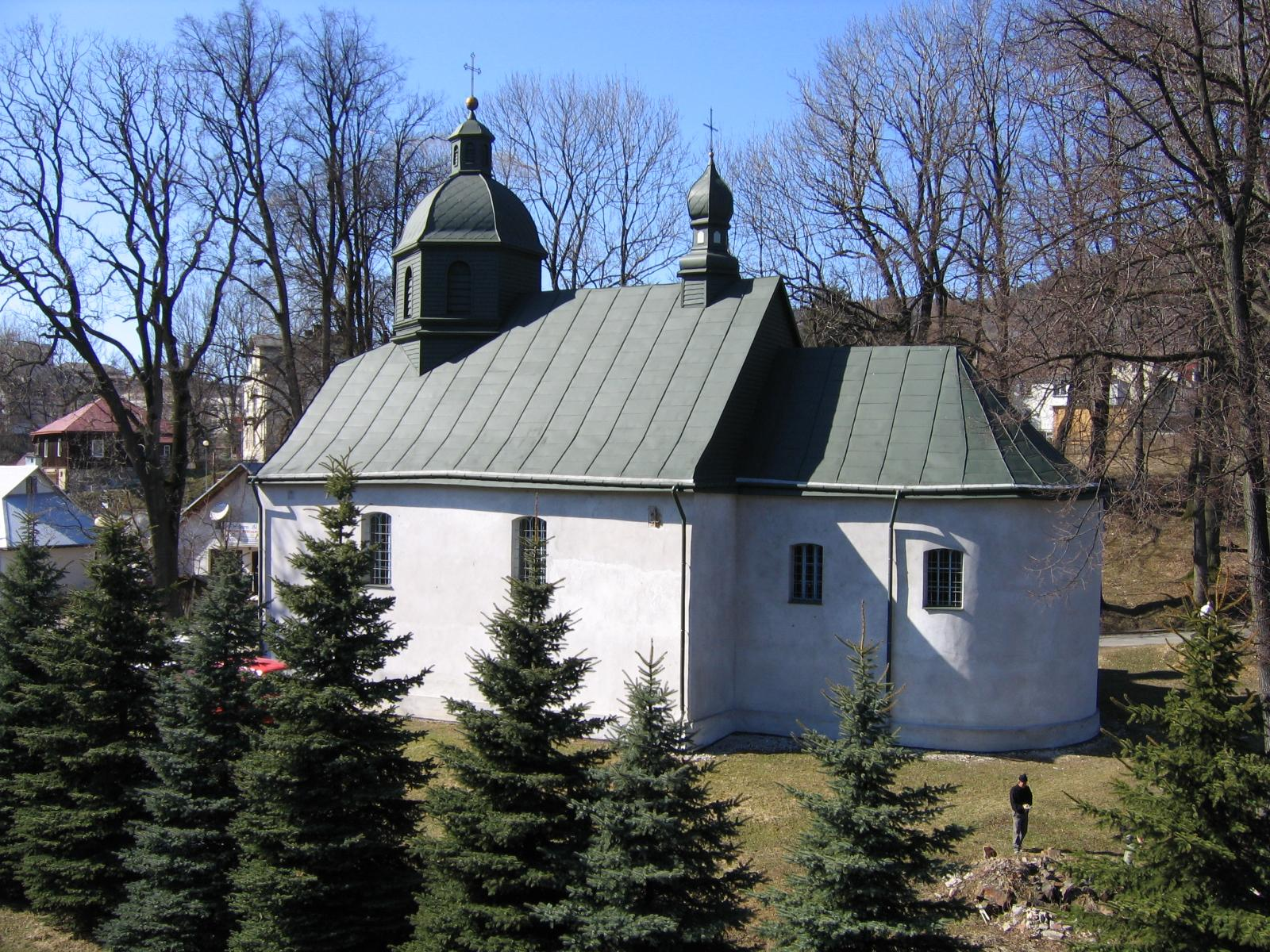
Greek-Catholic church in Ustrzyki Dolne

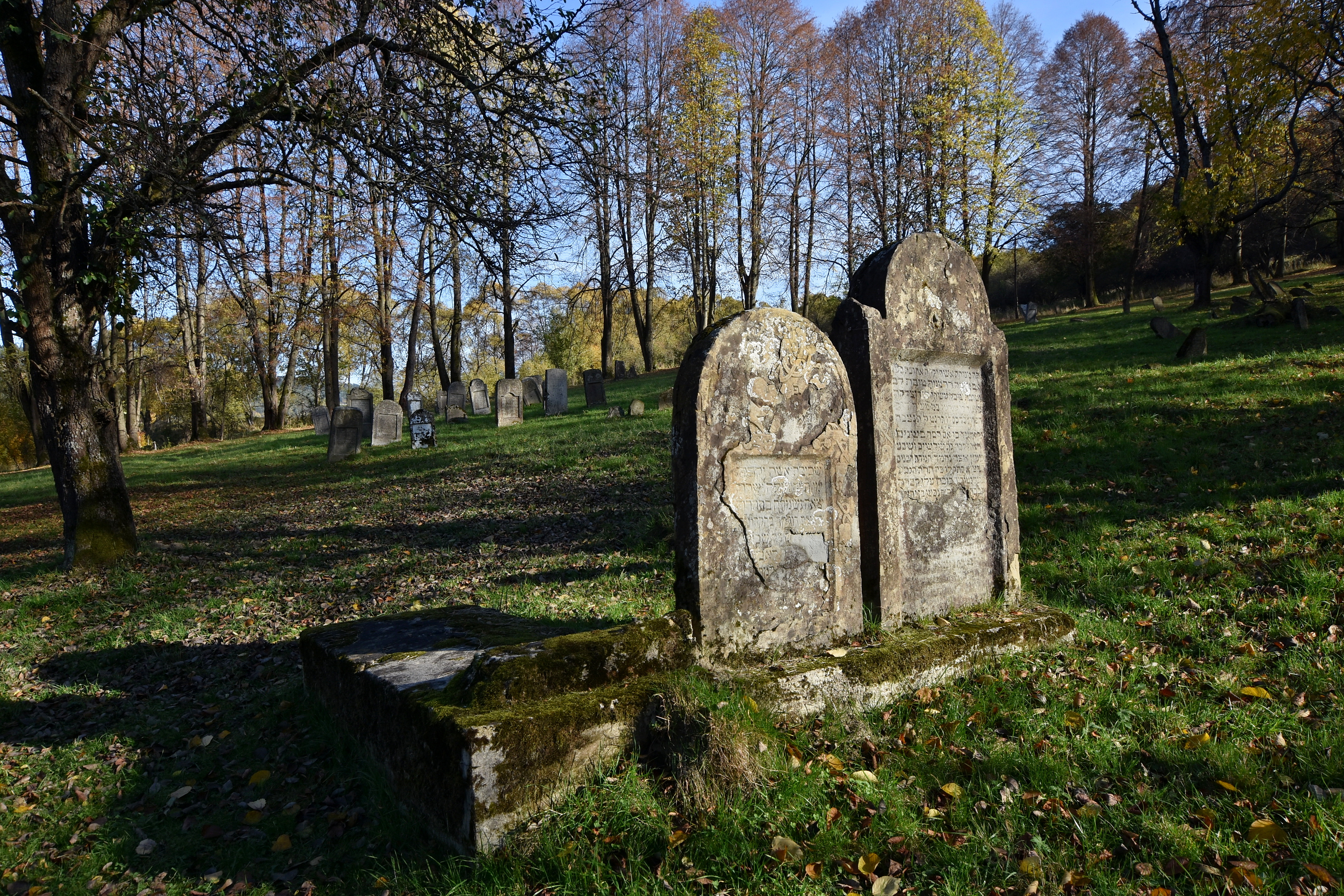
Jewish cemetery

== International relations ==
=== Twin towns — Sister cities ===
Ustrzyki Dolne is twinned with:

- Giraltovce, Slovakia
- Sambir, Ukraine
- Zamárdi, Hungary

== Culture ==
KSU, a Polish punk rock band was founded in 1977 in Ustrzyki Dolne. The name KSU comes from car license plates, issued by the Krosno Voivodeship authorities for vehicles from Ustrzyki Dolne at the time.

== Notable people ==
- Gedaliah Schorr (1911-1979), American Rosh Yeshiva born in Ustrzyki Dolne
