= Vasyl Stefanyk Precarpathian National University =

University in Ivano-Frankivsk, Ukraine

Coordinates: 48°54′54.74″N 24°42′4.29″E

Vasyl Stefanyk Carpathian National University
- Карпатський національний університет імені Василя Стефаника
- Motto: Άλφα και Ωμέγα
- Motto in English: Alpha and Omega [The First and the Last]
- Type: public, research, national
- Established: 1940
- Affiliations: Ministry of Education and Science of Ukraine
- Rector: Ihor Tsependa
- Students: 18,000
- Location: Shevchenko Street 57, Ivano-Frankivsk, Ivano-Frankivsk Oblast, 76018, Ukraine
- Campus: 6 urban
- Website: pnu.edu.ua

Vasyl Stefanyk Carpathian National University (abbr. CNU, Ukrainian: Карпатський національний університет імені Василя Стефаника, КНУ ім. В. Стефаника) is a public research university in Ivano-Frankivsk. It is one of the oldest institutions of higher education in Western Ukraine.

The history of the university dates back to March 15, 1940, when Stanislav Teacher Training Institute was established. Later, in 1950, it was renamed Stanislav (since 1962 - Ivano-Frankivsk) Pedagogical Institute. In January 1971, the institution was renamed after a famous Ukrainian writer Vasyl Stefanyk by the decree of the Council of Ministers of the USSR.

After the dissolution of the USSR, the Precarpathian University was founded on the base of Ivano-Frankivsk State Pedagogical Institute on August 26, 1992. On September 14, 2004, the Ministry of Education and Science of Ukraine awarded the University the national status, by its decree # 204. On August 15, 2025, the university was renamed into Vasyl Stefanyk Carpathian National University.

Currently, the university unites eight educational institutes, six faculties, three educational and consulting centers, one college, eleven research centers, Postgraduate Educational and Pre-university Training Center, Information Technology Center, the Center of Distance Learning and Knowledge Control, Teaching Management, Scientific and Research Department, Dendrological Park (Arboretum) and Botanical Garden.

== Administration ==
• Rector – Ihor Tsependa, Doctor of Political Sciences, Professor, Honorary Doctor of the University of Rzeszów (Poland, 2015), member of the Ukrainian Academy of Political Science.

• First vice-rector – Valentyna Yakubiv, Professor, Doctor of Economics.

• Vice-rector for scientific and pedagogical work – Serhii Sharyn, Professor, Doctor of Physics and Mathematics.

• Vice-rector for scientific and pedagogical work – Eduard Lapkovskyi, Docent, Candidate of Medicine.

• Vice-rector for scientific and pedagogical work – Ruslan Zapukhlyak, Professor, Doctor of Physics and Mathematics.

• Vice-rector for scientific and pedagogical work and socio-economical development – Yaroslav Shynkaruk, Professor, Candidate of Law.

== Accommodation and catering ==
The campus includes 6 dormitories for 2700 beds. Students and university staff can live there. The housing facilities are divided by a need-base formula.

== History ==
Galicia became a part of the USSR in September 1939. The positive outcome of this historical event was the unification of all Ukrainian lands in one state. It enabled the development of public education. At that time the Precarpathian region faced a severe shortage of teaching staff. Therefore, local authorities asked the government of URSR to establish a Teacher Training Institute and in January 1940 preparations for its opening began. As a result, on March 1 that year a new educational establishment opened its doors.

Three departments were created in the Institute: Department of History (Dean T. Velykyi), Department of Physics and Mathematics (Dean M. Korol) and Philological Department with two sub-departments – the Ukrainian Language and Literature and the Russian Language and Literature (Dean M. Shmulenzon).

Originally, it did not have its own building. It was using the classrooms in the commercial school. Overcrowding, lack of training equipment and educational and methodological literature were the main obstacles on the way to a proper development of the institute. Despite the difficulties, the institute actively pursued its activities. Before the war 900 future teachers studied there. However, with the Second World War many students and teachers went to fight, and some of them were evacuated. In particular the first dean of the Philological Department L. Shmulenzon, teachers W. Chornyi, L. Berezin, I. Popovskii, L. Nasonov died in the battles somewhere between Zhytomyr and Berdychiv. The first dean of the Faculty of History P. Velykyi was killed at Stalingrad. The first director of the Institute F. Plotnytskii died in a Gestapo torture chamber in Uman. Some of those who remained alive after the war continued to work in other institutions and establishments.

During the Nazi occupation, the Teacher Training Institute was closed, its property was robbed, and the school building was burnt. The amount of losses reached 3 million rubles. After the liberation of the land from the German invaders, measures to restore the work of Stanislav Teacher Training Institute were taken. The first post-war academic year began on Nov. 1, 1940 in the building in Shevchenko Street. In July 1945, the first 13 graduates gained their teaching diplomas. The 1945-1950 were the reconstruction years.

A new stage in the work of the educational institution began in the fifties. The Stanislav Teacher Training Institute became the Pedagogical Institute according to the resolution of Council of Ministers of the USSR on August 4, 1950. The training of highly qualified teachers has started.

Unfortunately, the institute could not avoid the domination of totalitarian regime that affected all aspects of the institute life. The declarations, ideology policies of the USSR had to be implemented and reflected in the educational process. The staff of the institute once again worked under difficult conditions because of the changes in curricula and temporary staff reduction. The institute was preparing teachers of a broader qualification. In 1963, the General Scientific Faculty was created. It became the fourth one alongside the History and Philology Department, Physics and Mathematics Faculty as well as the Faculty of the Methodology and Pedagogy of Primary Education. The main objective of the General Science Faculty was to provide higher education for part-time students so they could keep their jobs. Hundreds of students from the universities of Kyiv, Kharkiv, Lviv, Donetsk, and Chernivtsi who lived and worked in Ivano-Frankivsk Region enriched the number of the attenders of this faculty.

It is worth mentioning that scientific work was developing too. The Institute started to publish “The Memoirs” (since 1956). Twenty-three dissertations were defended within a short period of time – from the date of the establishing of the institute to 1965. Obviously, this number wasn't very impressive but it was legitimate for the developing of the educational institution.

The history of the Institute during the Soviet times had some other sad pages. In August and September 1965, the end of the “Khruschev’s thaw” period resulted in series of political arrests of the Ukrainian “dissidents of the sixties” who were speaking against Russification policy, injustice, and stood up for the sovereignty of Ukraine. The arrests touched the professors of Ivano-Frankivsk Pedagogical University too. Valentyn Moroz, Professor of Recent history, who had been working at the Institute for just a year was restrained by investigating authorities on August 31, 1965. The court held in Lutsk delivered the judgment: four years in a hard labor prison camp for his “anti-Soviet agitation and propaganda”. After being released in September 1969, he was restrained and imprisoned again for his new articles. Luckily, V. Moroz and four other dissidents were exchanged for two revealed in the USA soviet spies (1979). Abroad V.Moroz defended his doctorate dissertation.

V. Kravets (1957-1967), Candidate of Philosophy, assistant professor, O. Ustenko (1967-1980), Candidate of Economics, professor, I. Vasyuta (1980-1982), Doctor of History, professor, I. Kocheruk (1982-1986), Candidate of Physics and Mathematics, assistant professor were at the head of the institute.

In 1966, the Music and Pedagogical Faculty which prepared teachers of music and singing art for secondary schools was established in the institute. The Honoured Artist of the USSR, assistant professor V. Paschenko was the first dean of the department. Some important changes took place at other faculties too. Thus, in 1969 the Historical and Philological Faculty was divided into the Historical and Pedagogical Department and the Philological one. The first of the two offered its students not only the profession of a history and social study teacher but of a methodologist of the educational work as well.

A memorable date in the history of Ivano-Frankivsk Pedagogical Institute was January 5, 1971 when the name of the famous Ukrainian writer Vasyl Stefanyk was conferred to the establishment. Nowadays the Precarpathian National University uses it with honor.

In 1971, the Philology Department opened the specialty “the English Language” and in 1975 a new Faculty of Foreign Languages was established. Since 1977 graduate students have been given the qualification of a teacher of English and German.

At the beginning of Perestroika in the mid-1980s a new period in the life of the institute began. In 1986, the institute got a new rector Doctor of Philological Sciences, professor, V. Kononenko. He put much energy and efforts into the development and transformation of the institute into a modern European educational establishment, authoritative scientific centre.

First of all, the material and technical basis of the institute strengthened. The new building for classrooms, the concert hall and the library with its fund which comprised more than 500 000 volumes started operating. In 1988, the doors of the eight-storey building of Humanitarian faculties were opened for students. An active process of updating the content of higher education, searching for new and more effective teaching methods has begun. In 1987, Graphic Art Department was designed to train the teachers of Fine Arts, Drawing and Manual Training.

The proclamation of Ukrainian Independence and the development of national statehood created new conditions for the development of the educational system, including higher education. New tasks were given to teachers and scientists. It was necessary to provide residents with wider, thorough education which could meet standards of the modern life. This was possible only at a classical university. That's why the teaching staff of the institute submitted the application for getting a new status, the status of a university, to the first president of Ukraine L. Kravchuk. On September 26, 1992, L. Kravchuk signed the decree on the reorganization of Ivano-Frankivsk State Pedagogical Institute into Vasyl Stefanyk Precarpathian University. At that time, the educational establishment with its scientific potential occupied one of the leading places among the pedagogical institutions in Ukraine. Educational activities and research work were done by 240 staff members, among them there were 20 Doctors of Sciences, professors, 181 Candidates of Sciences, and associate professors at 36 departments. Most of them had already worked according to university standards, and hence, they had provided much deeper knowledge than the Pedagogical Institute had required. The student staff included 3950 full-time students and 2400 part-time students.

The development of the educational establishment in the status of university gained momentum.

1994 – Department of Regional Problems of the Institute of Political and Ethnic Studies of the National Academy of Sciences of Ukraine and Vasyl Stefanyk Precarpathian University was created.

1996 – Research Institute of Ukrainian Studies was established.

1999 – Institute of Physics and Chemistry; Institute and Pedagogical College were opened for work in Kolomyia.

1997 – On a five-year period of its existence in independent Ukraine our University was training 7 000 students and Junior Specialists in 22 specialties.

New faculties were established: Law, Economics, Philosophy, Natural Sciences, and Preparatory Courses. New specialties were introduced because of lack of professionals in the region: Jurisprudence, Finance and Credit, Accounting and Auditing, Psychology, Religious Studies, Polish language and literature, Chemistry, Biology, Decorative and Applied Arts, Design, and Social Pedagogy.

2001 – Faculty of Pedagogy was reorganized into Institute of Pedagogy. Faculties of Graphic Arts and Musical Pedagogy were reorganized into Institute of Culture and Arts – later into the Institute of Arts.

In 2002, Law Institute was established on the basis of the same-name Faculty. Just a year later, the Institute of Tourism started its work and welcomed the first students.

Considering the significant contribution of the Precarpathian University to the preparation of highly qualified specialists, fruitful scientific and educational work of the teaching staff, on 21 August 2004 Vasyl Stefanyk Precarpathian University got a status of a national one by the Presidential Decree No. 958 of 21 August 2004 and by the Decree of Ministry of Education and Science of Ukraine No. 718 of 13 September 2004.

In 2005, Doctor of Physical and Mathematical Sciences, Professor B. Ostafiichuk was elected as rector of the University. That year the Computer Maintenance Department was established in the University Scientific Library; the Institute of History and Political Science started its work at the Faculty of History. The Scientific and Research Laboratory was established at the Department of Physical Rehabilitation of the Faculty of Physical Education and Sports. A separate division of the University – Law College – was established a year later. The Publishing and Information Department started its work as a part of the Centre for Information Technology; the Department of Labour, Environmental and Agricultural Law was established at Law Institute; the Department of Statistics and Higher Mathematics was established at the Faculty of Mathematics and Computer Science. In 2008, the University founded the Centre for Bell Tolling and the Scientific and Research Centre "Psychology of Personality Development."

In 2009, the Scientific and Educational Centre "Nanomaterials in Generating and Energy Storage Devices" was established on the basis of the Precarpathian National University with the assistance of U.S. Agency for International Development (CRDF) and the Ministry of Education and Science of Ukraine within the framework of Bilateral Cooperation Program in Scientific and Technical Research and Education (CREST). Financing of the Centre was provided by CRDF and the Ministry of Education and Science on a parity basis. The Centre is the first to be supported by the U.S. Agency for International Development. The program aimed to accelerate Ukraine's transition to knowledge economy on the basis of science and higher education strengthening in Ukraine.

In 2010, the Statistical Analysis Laboratory was established; the Department of Tourism and Tourism Specializations started its work at the Institute of Tourism; the Institute of History and Political Science established the Department of Foreign Languages and Translation and the Room of Numismatics. The Centre for Innovation Activity and Technology Transfer started its work as a part of the Scientific and Research Unit of the University. Sports Complex "Olympus" was opened. The Educational and Scientific Laboratory of Carbon Nanomaterials and Supercapacitors was established a year later.

In April 2012, Doctor of Political Sciences, Professor I. Tsependa was elected as a rector of the University. The educational and scientific base of the University, its scientific potential began to increase, there appeared new educational divisions, courses and specialties at the University and the number of students began to grow. That year, in May, the Department of Life Safety was established. The Department of Educative Work was reorganized into the Department of Educative, Psychological and Educational Work. Educational and Scientific Institute of Postgraduate Education and Distance Learning was established. The Licensing and Accreditation Department started its work; a separate division of Ivano-Frankivsk College of SHEI "Vasyl Stefanyk Precarpathian National University" was established. In addition, two international projects were implemented successfully: the establishment of the International University Centre of the Ukrainian-Polish Youth in the village of Mykulychyn, Nadvirna District; there novation of the unique high-altitude Observatory on Mount Pip Ivan done on the EU funds.

The year of 2014 opened the educational scientific laboratory of biological ecology at the Institute of Natural Sciences as well as embodied National Contact Points (NCPs) of EU Horizon 2020 programs for "Nanotechnologies, advanced materials and advanced modern production". The Department of Journalism was created at the Institute of Philology in 2014.

The monument to Roman Huryk was unveiled on October 14, 2014 at the university campus. The student of the Department of Philosophy was killed in February 2014 in Kyiv during the Revolution of Dignity.

Today educational and scientific work is carried out by 1003 full-time lecturers in 80 departments, among them 108 doctors of science, professors, 635 candidates of sciences, associate professors. There are 3 Academicians of the State Academies of Sciences of Ukraine,1 Corresponding Member of the NAS of Ukraine,1 corresponding member of the Academy of Arts of Ukraine, 3 National Artists of Ukraine, 10 Honoured Artists of Ukraine, 16 Honoured workers of Culture of Ukraine, 13 Honoured workers of Science and Technology of Ukraine, 5 Honoured workers of Arts of Ukraine, 9 Honoured workers of Education of Ukraine, 1 Honoured worker of Higher School of Ukraine, 7 Honoured lawyers of Ukraine, 3 Honoured painters of Ukraine, 1 Honoured economist of Ukraine, 3 Honoured workers of Physical Culture and Sports of Ukraine, 3 Honoured trainers of Ukraine, and 8 Honoured Masters of Sports of Ukraine.

There is a postgraduate course in 54 specialities for a Doctor of Philosophy Degree and a Doctor of Science Degree in 7 specialities. About 16 thousand students are trained in 15 directions and 48 specialities for Junior Specialist, Bachelor's and master's degrees. For the time of its activity the university has trained more than 140 thousand specialists. The university maintains close relations with many scientific and educational institutions of the world, prepares and implements joint research programs.

Today the University has seven leading scientific schools: the Research School of Physical and Chemical Problems of Materials Study of Thin Films, the School of Magnetism and Nanotechnologies, the Precarpathian History School, the History of Education and Pedagogical Thought in Galicia, the Problems of Semantic Syntax, the Precarpathian Practical Academic School of Comparative Studies, and Bioecology Scientific School "Mountain Forestry and Bioindication".

== Rectors ==
2012 – Tsependa, Ihor Yevhenovych

2005-2012 – Ostafiichuk, Bohdan Kostiantynovych

1986-2004 – Kononenko, Vitalii Ivanovych

1982-1986 – Kucheruk, Ivan Metrofanovych

1980-1982 – Vasiuta, Ivan Kyrylovych

1967-1980 – Ustenko, Oleksandr Andriyovych

1957-1967 – Kravets, Vasyl Musiyovych

1956-1957 – Shevchenko, Ivan Hryhorovych

1953-1956 – Hrechukh, Hryhorii Teodorovych

1950-1953 – Shvetsov, Kostiantyn Ivanovych

1949-1950 – Buialo, Viktor Andriyovych

1945-1949 – Bozhko, Trokhym Zakharovych

1940-1941 – Plotnytsky, Fedir Ivanovych

== Institutes and faculties ==
Institute of Philology

Chair of Ukrainian Language

Chair of Ukrainian Literature

Chair of World Literature and Comparative Literature Studies

Chair of Slavonic Language

Chair of General and German Language Studies

Chair of Journalism

Institute of Pedagogy

B. Stuparyk Chair of Pedagogy

Chair of Philology and Methodology of Elementary Education

Chair of Theory and Methodology of Pre-school and Remedial Education

Chair of Mathematical and Natural Disciplines of Elementary Education

Chair of Theory and Methodology of Elementary Education

Chair of Social Pedagogy and Social Work

Chair of Art Disciplines of Elementary Education

Faculty of Philosophy

Chair of Pedagogic and Age Psychology

Chair of General and Clinical Psychology

Chair of Philosophy and Psychology

Chair of Religion Studies, Theology and Cultural Studies

Chair of Social Psychology

Faculty of Mathematics and Computer Science

Chair of Differential Equations and Applied Mathematics

Chair of Mathematical and Functional Analysis

Chair of Information Science

Chair of Statistics and Higher Mathematics

Chair of Algebra and Geometry

Chair of Informational Technologies

Faculty of Foreign Languages

Chair of English Philology

Chair of German Philology

Chair of Foreign Languages

Chair of French Philology

Faculty of Physics and Technology

Chair of Computer Engineering and Electronics

Chair of Theoretical and Experimental Physics

Chair of Materials Science and Latest Technologies

Chair of Physics and Chemistry of Solids

Faculty of Economics

Chair of Finance

Chair of Accounting and Audit

Chair of Management and Marketing

Chair of Economic Cybernetics

Chair of Theoretical and Applied Economics

Faculty of Physical Education and Sports

Chair of Theory and Methods of Physical Training and Sports

Chair of Sport and Pedagogic Disciplines

Chair of Physical Rehabilitation

Educational and Research Institute of Postgraduate Education and Distance Learning

Chair of Management and Business Administration

== The scientific library ==
The Scientific Library of Vasyl Stefanyk Precarpathian National University was founded in 1944. In 2000, the library received the status of the scientific institution. It has a substantial and unique informational fund (more than 600000 books in Ukrainian, Russian, Polish, English, French, German, Chinese, Czech, Spanish and other languages, 20000 musical publications, 50000 periodicals, authors’ abstracts, dissertations and graduation projects), an integrated electronic catalogue, electronic database.

The library consists of five departments:

Scientific and Educational Literature Department;

Acquisition and Scientific Processing Department;

Information and Bibliography Department;

Scientific and Methodological Department;

Information Technology and Computer Software Department.

Readers have also access to 16 reading rooms with the capacity of 980 seats, 2 circulation desks, and 4 library departments in Kolomyia, Kalush, Rakhiv, and Chortkiv.

The Information and Bibliography Department is the main library information center that offers access to catalogues, indexes, bibliographic description. The reference fund of the Department contains more than 6 thousand copies.

In October 2005, the Automated Library System “UFD/Biblioteka” was purchased. Its goal is to create a unified automated bibliographic information system. Since 2008 a Scientific Library Website has been operating. Thus, users can get certain information about the divisions and units of the library, find useful information for teaching and research activities. In particular, permanent access to the electronic library catalogue is available via the Internet. Using the local network and the library website you can obtain access to the electronic library and thus – to full-text scientific, educational and methodical publications by the scholars of the university. There is an opportunity to provide Interlibrary Loan Service and Electronic Document Delivery. Students can also use Ivano-Frankivsk Region Libraries services.

There is a virtual bibliographical reference with the help of which queries are performed every day according to the mode of admission. The electronic reading room is equipped with 25 workplaces where visitors have access to the fund of electronic documents and local databases. In the reading halls book exhibitions are on display; literary soirées, round tables, and readers’ conferences are organized. The library staff provides methodical current advice for first year, undergraduate and final year students.

== Halychyna journal ==
Halychyna is a Ukrainian scientific, cultural, and educational local history journal published in Ivano-Frankivsk by the staff of the Institute of History and Political Science of the university.The first issue was published in 1997. The journal was approved by the Higher Attestation Commission of Ukraine as a professional publication in history and art history. The editor-in-chief is Mykola Kuhutyak.

== International cooperation ==
In order to implement the principles of the Bologna Declaration, Vasyl Stefanyk Precarpathian National University draws particular attention to international cooperation, expands and improves its activity. To realize the plan about international cooperation in education, the university has made and continues to make a number of arrangements that prove its developing status in this sphere.

The university implies the following objectives:

1. to cooperate with the most competitive universities in the Central and Eastern Europe;
2. to implement great common projects so that to be recognized and to stand out among other universities;
3. to provide students, postgraduates and lecturers’ exchanges with the universities of Europe and Asia in order to expand cooperation with foreign partners.

The setup of researches joint with international educational establishments is in the mainstream of the university activity.

Vasyl Stefanyk Precarpathian National University and Warsaw University (Poland) are among the creators of The Consortium between Warsaw University and 10 Ukrainian universities. Since 2014 the university has been a part of the Consortium of universities in Baltic region and Ukraine.

The university concluded 56 partnerships with different foreign educational and scientific establishments. A partnership between academic and research institutes of the University of Warsaw, Jagiellonian University in Kraków, the Academy of Mining and Metallurgy in Kraków, the Pomeranian Academy in Słupsk, the University of Rzeszów, Vytautas Magnus University in Kaunas, the University of Latvia, Vilnius University, the University of Valencia, the University in Port, Lund University, the University of Poitiers, the Tien Shan Classic University, the Charles University in Prague, the Brest State Technical University, the University of the Republic of San Marino, the Stefan cel Mare University of Suceava (Romania).

Vasyl Stefanyk Precarpathian National University is a member of the following international associations and organizations: the European University Association (EUA) – Brussels, Belgium; the Eurasian Association of Universities (EAU) – Moscow, Russia.

The European Commission supported the university in implementing the following projects:

"The International Meeting Centre of Ukrainian and Polish Students" (Warsaw, Poland, the University of Warsaw)

"The Reconstruction of Astronomical Observatory on Mountain Pip Ivan" (Warsaw, Poland, the University of Warsaw).

Students of Vasyl Stefanyk Precarpathian National University have the opportunity to take part in different international arrangements which the University suggests: trainings abroad, double diploma programs (International Relations, Science of Law, Computer Science, Mathematics, Physics, Philosophy, Tourism, Primary Education, and Physical Training), participation in international conferences, students interchange, and conducting scientific-research work at foreign educational establishments.

Within 2014-2015 the amount of assignments accomplished by the students and the faculty members abroad has increased in comparison with 2013-2014.

In addition, the international authority of Vasyl Stefanyk Precarpathian National University is growing. The State and public institutions organize a range of international arrangements, so with every year the number of official foreign visits is increasing.

Scientists successfully participate in different international scientific-educational projects. Besides, grant-providers promote the development of international cooperation. In particular, within the Cross-European Cooperation Program Vasyl Stefanyk Precarpathian National University has become a partner of the ProgramIANUSII-ErasmusMundus. It is carried out due to the financial support of The European Commission which provides mobility for students of bachelor and master programs, postgraduates, lecturers, EU universities collaborators and country-partners collaborators.

== See also ==
- Prykarpattia
- Ciscarpathia
- List of universities in Ukraine
