= Black Sea Germans =

Ethnic group in Ukraine

Total population
- 33,302

Regions with significant populations
- Odesa Oblast, Kherson Oblast, Zaporizhzhia Oblast, Kyiv

Languages
- German, Ukrainian, Russian

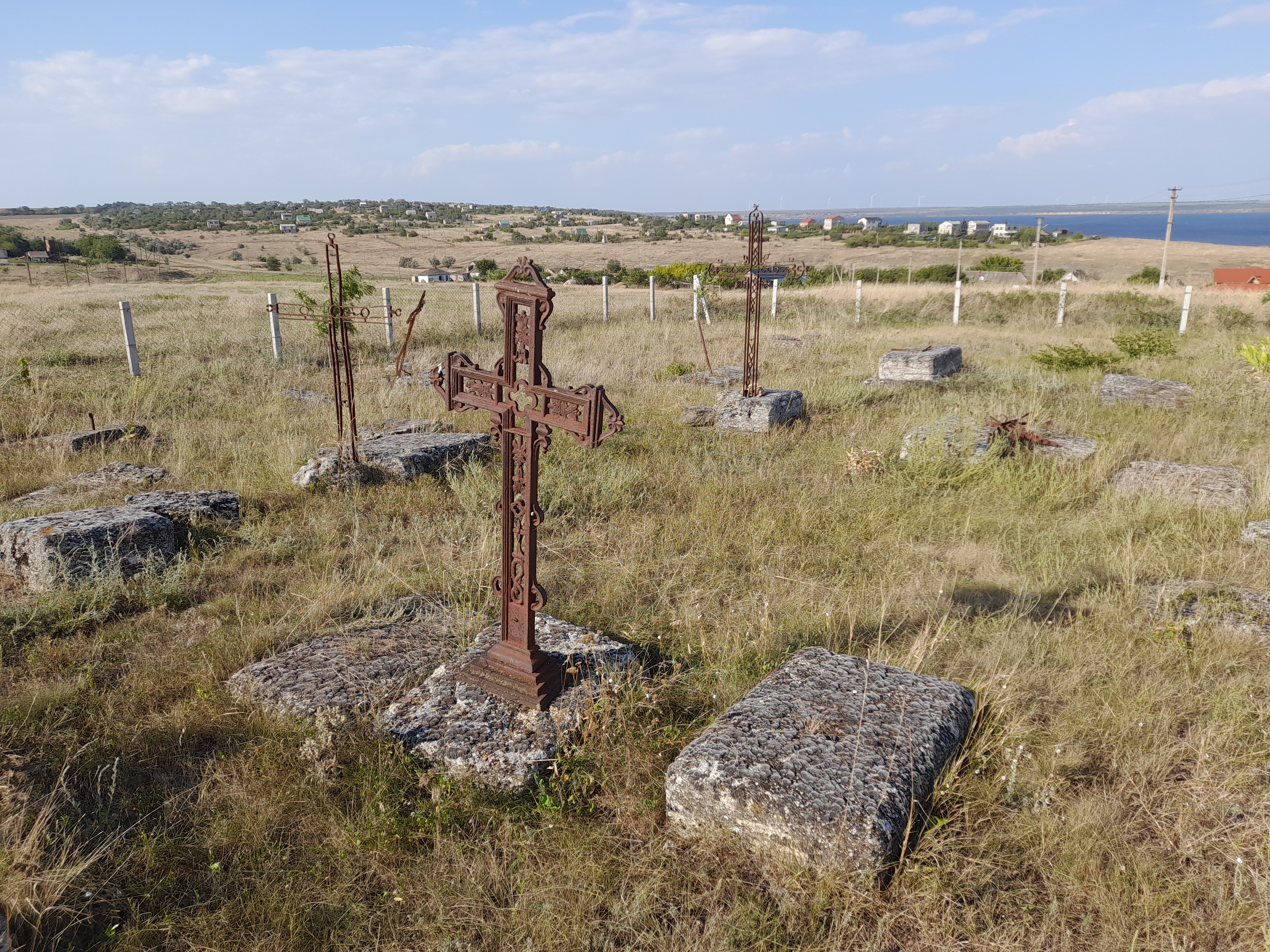
German graves (early 19th century) in the village of Pshonyanove, Odesa Raion, Odesa Oblast, Ukraine

The Black Sea Germans (German: Schwarzmeerdeutsche; Russian: черноморские немцы, romanized: chernomorskiye nemtsy; Ukrainian: чорноморські німці, romanized: chornomors'ki nimtsi) are ethnic Germans who left their homelands (starting in the late-18th century, but mainly in the early-19th century at the behest of Emperor Alexander I of Russia, r. 1801–1825), and settled in territories off the north coast of the Black Sea, mostly in the territories of the southern Russian Empire (including modern-day Ukraine).

Black Sea Germans are distinct from similar groups of settlers (Crimean Goths, the Bessarabia Germans, Crimea Germans, Dobrujan Germans, Russian Mennonites, Volga Germans, and Volhynian Germans), who are separate chronologically, geographically and culturally, but not mutually exclusive groups.

== History ==
Germans began settling in southern Ukraine and the Crimean Peninsula in the late 18th century, but the bulk of immigration and settlement occurred during the Napoleonic period, from 1800 onward, with a concentration in the years 1803 to 1805. At the time, southern Ukraine was part of the Russian Empire. Designated New Russia, and often colloquially South Russia (or Südrussland by its German-speaking inhabitants), these lands had been annexed by the Russian Empire during the reign of Catherine the Great after wars against the Ottoman Empire (1768–1774) and the Crimean Khanate (1783). The area of settlement was not as compact as that of the Volga territory; rather it was home to a chain of colonies. The first German settlers arrived in 1787, first from West Prussia, then later from western and southwestern Germany and Alsace, France; as well as from the Warsaw area. Catholics, Lutherans, and Mennonites were all known as farmers (see Molotschna for Mennonite settlements in the Melitopol area); the Empress Catherine, herself an ethnic German, sent them a personal invitation to immigrate to the Russian Empire, as she felt they would make useful subjects and enrich her realm. She granted them privileges such as the free exercise of their religion and language within their largely closed communities, also exemption from military service and taxation.

=== Emigration to the Americas ===
In the late 19th century, both changing political conditions and growing hostilities towards Germans from Russia caused many Black Sea Germans, as well as Volga Germans, among other Germans from Russian communities, to begin migrating to North and South America, especially to Canada, the United States and Argentina.

==== United States ====
The first Black Sea German settlements in the United States were established in 1873 near the town of Lesterville, South Dakota, but they soon spread throughout both Dakotas. Lutherans and Catholics were the largest groups among the Black Sea Germans in the Dakotas. Other settlers from the Black Sea were Russian Mennonites and Hutterites, as well as Dobrujan Germans who had briefly lived in southeastern Romania. By 1920, an estimated 70,000 Germans from Russia lived in North Dakota, most of them were Black Sea Germans, in addition to Volga Germans. There, most Bessarabia Germans, Black Sea Germans, Crimea Germans, and Volga Germans became wheat farmers.

Currently, it is estimated that 30-40% of North Dakota's population is of German from Russia descent, primarily Black Sea German.

North Dakota State University maintains an archive, the Germans From Russian Heritage Collection, concerning this immigrant group.

==== Canada ====
Due to the increasing scarcity of farmland in the Dakotas of the United States, many Black Sea Germans resettled in the Canadian provinces of Alberta and Saskatchewan, where they left descendants. The Canadian Prairies, especially in the province of Alberta, received Black Sea Germans, especially between 1900 and 1913, when the expansion of the railway branches made them easily accessible to new settlers. Previously, from the Black Sea region, Canada had already received Russian Mennonites. However, the forced assimilation policies implemented by Canada caused many Russian Mennonites to begin emigrating to various Latin American countries beginning in the 1920s.

==== Argentina ====
The first contingents of Black Sea Germans arrived in Argentina in 1898. Volga Germans, who had begun migrating to the country 20 years earlier, outnumbered Black Sea Germans at all times. Thus, many of them joined Argentine towns where there were already Volga Germans and in other cases founded their own colonies. Many of the Black Sea Germans who arrived in Argentina came from the Black Sea colonies München, Speier/Speyer, Rastadt, Landau, Rohrbach, Manheim, Karlsruhe, Kandel, etc. They settled, mainly, in the southwest of Buenos Aires Province and in the east of La Pampa Province.

In 1905, some Black Sea German families bought land in Estancia El Lucero, in Coronel Suárez Partido (Coronel Suárez Partido has been simultaneously one of the epicenters of the Volga German settlements in Argentina), Buenos Aires Province. The next year, other Black Sea German families founded Colonia Monte La Plata, in Villarino Partido, same province. Many others settled in La Pampa Province, where there were already Volga German colonies, too. In this second province, Colonia San José (in English: "Saint Joseph Colony") was one of the examples of coexistence between Volga Germans and Black Sea Germans in the country. It had been founded by Volga Germans and later several Black Sea German families joined. In its cemetery, a long central path perpendicular to its entrance divides the land in two: on one side are the graves of the Volga Germans and their descendants, and on the other are the graves of the Black Sea Germans and their descendants. Over the years, its inhabitants have migrated to other Argentine towns or cities; however, this cemetery is a testimony of the way in which both German communities have cooperated in the country, without losing their own identities. In addition, this particularity facilitates any search.

Regarding the Russian Mennonites, in 1877, a small group had arrived in Argentina and settled near Olavarría, in Buenos Aires Province. However, they were not conservative and soon assimilated with Germans living in that area. Instead, in the 1980s, the first very conservative Russian Mennonite colony (Old Colony Mennonites) was founded in the country. Its inhabitants are descendants of the Russian Mennonites who had fled Canadian forced assimilation policies in the 1920s. At that time, their ancestors settled in Mexico. But then, some of the later generations considered they were also in danger of assimilation there, so they left Mexico and settled in Argentina and other countries. This colony is located in the former Estancia Remecó (in English: "Remecó Ranch"), 40 km from Guatraché, in La Pampa Province. Curiously, Guatraché is, at the same time, one of the Argentine towns where the majority of the population is made up of Volga German and Black Sea German descent. Later, other Russian Mennonite colonies were founded in other places of Argentina.

=== Russian Revolution and deportations ===
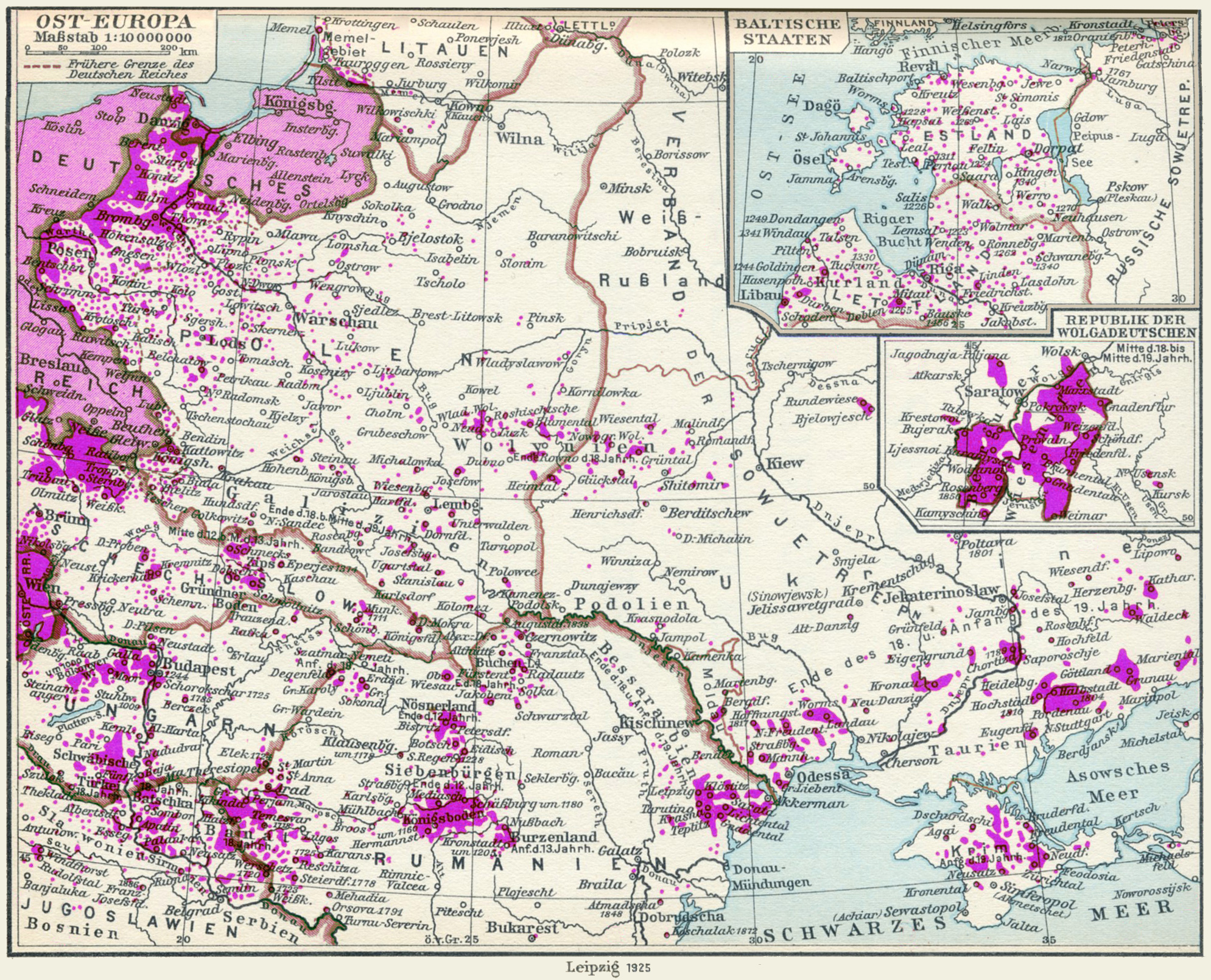
Distribution of ethnic Germans in Central/Eastern Europe in 1925, also highlighting German settlements in Ukraine

After the Bolshevik Revolution and the formation of the Soviet Union, Black Sea Germans, prior to World War II, were subjected to the forced starvation of man-made famines, the closure of German-language churches, schools, and community organisations, and were required to change their language of instruction from German to Russian. The 45,000 Germans in Crimea (along with other Black Sea Germans) were forced into exile in Siberia and Kazakhstan, many into forced labour camps. Many did not survive the labor camps.

Many were deported as a result of the collectivization of all Soviet agricultural land in 1930/1931 by Stalin's first five-year plan. The German farmers were labelled kulaks (rich peasants) by the Communist regime, and those who did not voluntarily agree to give up their land to the Soviet farming collectives were expelled to Siberia and Central Asia. The mass deportation of the Germans was based on social and ethnic criteria, the German Russian settlements probably suffered more than any other communities. About 1.2 percent of the Soviet population was classified as kulak and deported to the Gulag, based on a total Soviet population of 147 million, according to the 1926 census. The number of ethnic Germans sent to the camps as kulaks was about 50,000 out of a German population in the Soviet Union at the time of the same census of 1.239 million, that is, about 4 percent of the German population. The Germans were not the only ethnic group deported in large numbers during the collectivization drive, as many ethnic Poles also suffered the same fate. Germans, however, comprised the single largest foreign-origin minority sent into internal exile in the Soviet Union. There appeared to have been a deep prejudice against German communities because many Soviet officials considered all German farmers kulaks.

After Germany's invasion of the Soviet Union on 22 June 1941, the Soviet leadership decided to label all ethnic Germans from Russia as enemies of the USSR, and accused them of collaborating with Nazis, most were arrested, even killed or deported to labor camps. The Supreme Soviet decreed the first evacuations, which were really expulsions, as the inhabitants were never allowed to return. Action to deport every ethnic German from the Crimea began on 15 August 1941. Although the decree stated that old people would not have to leave, everyone was expelled, first to Stavropol, and then to Rostov in southeastern Ukraine, near Crimea, but then all were sent on to camps and special settlements in Kazakhstan. Given only three or four hours to pack, the deportees were not told where they were going, how long they would stay there, or how much food to take. The result was starvation for many and, due to the confusion, the separation of many families. In all, perhaps as many as 60,000 ethnic Germans were expelled from the Crimean peninsula alone at this time. Other parts of Southern Russian were also affected.

Although the majority of the Black Sea Germans avoided deportation due to the rapid advance of the German Army, Stalin, nevertheless, had sufficient time to arrest and exile those living east of the Dnieper River. Between 25 September 1941 and 10 October 1941, approximately 105,000 ethnic Germans were exiled from this region and forcibly deported to Soviet-held areas far to the east beyond the Ural mountains. In terms of total numbers deported to Siberia and Central Asia, between 15 August and 25 December 1941, the Soviet authorities expelled and exiled 856,000 German from Russia.

Because of the quick conquest of Soviet territory by the Axis in the early months of their invasion, the Soviet regime was not able to deport the majority of the ethnic Germans from the western part of the Soviet Union, that is, the area west of the Dnieper river. The German towns and villages in the Western Ukraine, in Volhynia, and the Black Sea region all came under Nazi German rule, first under a military government and then under that of the Nazi Party or the SS, as Reichskommissariat Ukraine.

==== Evacuation of Ethnic Germans during World War II ====
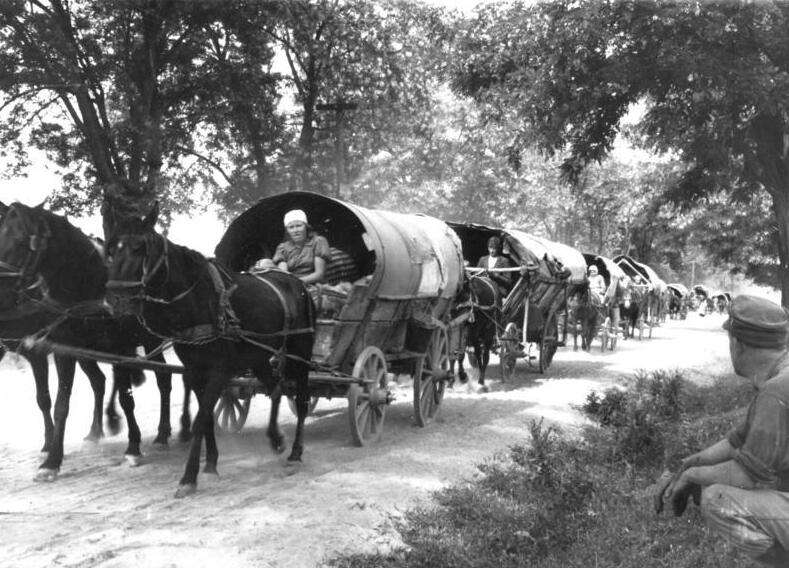
A refugee trek of Black Sea Germans during the Second World War in Hungary, July 1944

With the defeat of the German Army at Stalingrad in the winter of 1942–1943, the Soviet Red Army began its offensive, recapturing more and more German-occupied territory. SS Head Heinrich Himmler made a decision to evacuate all ethnic Germans and bring them to the Reich. Evacuations began in scattered German communities in the North Caucasus, where in February 1943, 11,000 people were transferred. Shortly thereafter, 40,000 German Russians were sent westward from the area between the Don and Dnieper Rivers. When the Soviet troops neared the Dnieper River in October 1943, the Chortitza Mennonite communities, totaling about 35,000 people, had to flee. In October, 45,000 ethnic Germans from Volhynia (Western Ukraine) were also forced to leave, and, by February 1944, it became clear to the Germans in Southern Ukraine that the Red Army could not be stopped; thus, they began their hurried evacuation. About 135,000 fled to the West. Approximately 280,000 ethnic Germans were successfully brought out of the occupied Soviet Union, which represented almost 90 percent of the registered German population, according to the 1943 Reich census.

On the basis of the articles pertaining to the repatriation of nationals in the Yalta Agreement, the United States and the Soviet Union agreed to return each other's nationals at the end of the war. Of the almost 300,000 ethnic Germans who were evacuated by the Germans from the Soviet Union, about 200,000 were caught and sent to the labor camps by the Red Army, either as they fled from the Warthegau in Western Poland, previously incorporated into the German state, (about 120,000), or elsewhere in Eastern Europe or when they were forcibly repatriated from occupied Germany to the Soviet Union.

== Colonies in the Black Sea region ==
=== Schwedengebiet ===
This enclave of German settlement, established by the Russian imperial government, lies on the west bank of the Dnieper river in the Beryslav Raion district of Kherson Oblast, Ukraine, some 12 kilometers (or 7 Versts under the old Tsarist system of measurement) east-north-east (16.6 km by car, and 16.4 km by approved footpaths) of the town of Beryslav on the same side of the river.

Originally settled in 1782 by manumitted ethnic Swedish serfs from the Baltic island of Hiiumaa (Dagö) in present-day Estonia who were freed by Catherine the Great and invited to settle here, the district took its German name — Schwedengebiet translates as "Swedes' district" — from these earlier settlers, despite the fact that once the Germans began to arrive as official settlers during the Napoleonic period, they soon outnumbered their Swedish precursors.

Due to attrition, Swedish numbers had fallen within a few years of their leaving their Baltic homeland. To make up for this shortfall, new settlers, mostly ethnic Germans originating in the lands of the Holy Roman Empire of the German Nation, such as Württemberg, and the Austrian Habsburg hereditary lands, as well as Poland and Alsace-Lorraine, were invited to settle in the area from the turn of the 19th century. Both the arrival of the Swedes and the later advent of the Germans formed two stages of the same official Russian imperial policy designed to secure what was then a relatively new part of the Russian Empire which had only been in Russia's sway since they had defeated of the Ottoman Empire in 1774 and won these vast southern territories, known first as New Russia, and later as Southern Russia.

The oldest village, first established in 1782, was the Swedish Lutheran village of Gammalsvenskby. In the period 1802–1806, after a generation alone, during which their numbers had been supplemented on occasion by Swedes captured in war and other, mostly temporary, sojourners from Danzig, the local Baltic Swedish community was faced with the arrival of German speakers. This not only meant that they no longer had this area to themselves, but the Swedes had to share their original wooden church with some permanent incomers, ethnic German Lutherans. As it happened, the Germanophones also included Roman Catholics, which was another source of community tension. The Germans of either denomination called the village "Alt-Schwedendorf" (literally, old Swedes' village) after the existing Swedes settlers. Basing themselves in Alt-Schwedendorf for a time, the Germans established several entirely German villages (Kolonien). In addition, some Germans also remained in Alt-Schwedendorf. In all, there were the following four initial settlements. They were initially established along confessional lines first in 1782, with the latter ones created in the period 1802 to 1806, viz.:

- Alt-Schwedendorf (Standard Swedish: Gammalsvenskby, lit. 'Old Swedish Village', local Swedish dialect: Gammölsvänskbi, Ukrainian: Старошведське, romanized: Staroshvedske, Russian: Старошве́дское, romanized: Starosvedkaya; also known as Вербівка (Verbivka); Старошведське and Вербівка are rendered in German as Staroschwedske and Werbiwka respectively): originally, and overwhelmingly, Lutheran, it was founded by Swedes in 1782, and later supplemented by German settlers, mostly Lutherans, in the period 1802 to 1806. As the oldest and, then, sole village already established, it served as the short-term mustering place from which three other (German) colonies were settled according to religion and ethnicity. As such, for a time, its inhabitants included some German Roman Catholics who settled to the north in the new village of Klosterdorf, or left the area entirely, for destinations such as the Taurien district of Crimea, further to the south. The majority of the influx, however, consisted of German Lutherans who were settled to the south of Alt-Schwedendorf in what were, at least, at the outset, the exclusively German Lutheran villages of Mühlhausendorf and Schlangendorf, for which, see below. After years of tension between the Lutheran Swedes and Lutheran Germans, the Swedes built their own parish church dedicated to St John the Baptist (consecrated 1886; it was later closed during Soviet times and used for various purposes, but is now refurbished and used as an Orthodox Christian church) in the village of Gammalsvenskby/Alt-Schwedendorf, while the German Lutherans of the two southern neighbouring villages built their own house of worship (Betthaus, literally German for prayer house) between the two German Lutheran villages of Mühlhausendorf and Schlangendorf, and dedicated it to St Peter and St Paul (consecrated 1888). As for Alt-Schwedendorf, in 1915, it, along with the three other original villages, was subsumed into modern Zmiivka (see German Schlangendorf, below). As Gammalsvenskby, it is, however, accorded historic status in the region for its association with one of the few settlements of Swedish-speaking colonists in what was once known as South Russia or New Russia, and now forms part of Ukraine (see article on Gammalsvenskby for more details of this aspect of the village's history and current role as an historic site). The church records of the local Lutheran population, whether German or Swedish, survive for part of the nineteenth century (1833–1885), in the archives of the St Petersburg Evangelical Lutheran Consistory, and have been microfilmed by the Genealogical Society of Utah, and partially indexed. For many years, the records for Alt-Schwedendorf were recorded in tandem with those of Josefstal (older German spelling, Josephsthal; its Ukrainian name is Samarivka/Самарівка), an upriver village in the former Ekaterinoslav colonies (which see below) over 250 km to the north whose Lutheran pastors visited Alt-Schwedendorf occasionally to perform marriages, leaving the baptisms and burials to be performed by laymen such as the church sexton or village schoolmaster. During that period, Alt-Schwedendorf was effectively a filial chapelry of Josefstal, meaning that many of the records relevant to its inhabitants have been indexed and appear under the mother parish's name rather than the daughter community to which these folk belonged. Confusing as this may be, successful research into this area can mean one encounters records and studies written not only in German, but in also Swedish, Russian, and English. To complicate matters further, when a large number of the ethnic Swedes of the area were allowed to leave the Soviet Union for Sweden, they were provided with a copy of their original parish registers (in German Kirchenbücher, literally church books, or Matrikeln, for registers) dating back to the foundation of the Swedish colony in 1782. These registers include records covering the ethnic German Lutheran population particularly in cases of intermarriage, and cover the whole period of Swedish habitation up to the partial departure in 1929.
- Klosterdorf (literally "Monastery (or, abbey) village", in German, and named for the ruins of a former Orthodox monastery in the vicinity; in Russian, Костирка Kostirka): Roman Catholic, founded in 1804. For many years, Klosterdorf did not have its own priest. Instead it was a filial chapelry served by priests from the city parish of St Pius and St Nicholas in Kherson, part of the Odesa deanery of the Tiraspol Roman Catholic diocese. By 1864, however, the local German Catholic community had raised enough funds to pay for a village chapel dedicated to St Vincent, which eventually became an independent parish church. The last priest, the Reverend Father Johann Lorenzovitch Thauberger, was martyred during the Soviet era repression of worship The whereabouts of any surviving original parish registers of this community are unknown. Under Russian law, however, annual returns copied from the parish registers of birth/baptism, marriage, and death/burial for this community were sent to archives designated by the civil authorities to act as civilian record repositories to document the populace for the purpose of control, taxation, and military service. From 1853 until the shortly after the end of the Russian imperial era, the surviving returns for the area are held in the Tiraspol Roman Catholic Consistory fonds at the Saratov State Archives in Saratov, Russia. Earlier church records are to be found in the fonds covering the Mohilev Roman Catholic Consistory, for the period from 1801 to 1853, with some overlap in the Kherson Roman Catholic Consistory (from 1850 to 1853), until, with the establishment of the diocese of Tiraspol, coverage, backdated by almost a half a decade, became effective from 1853 to 1918.
- Mühlhausendorf (literally German for village of the mill houses; in Russian, Mikhailovka, in Ukrainian, Mykhailivka, both meaning Michael's village): Lutheran when founded in 1803–1805, with a later admixture of Roman Catholic Germans.
- Schlangendorf (literally German for Snake village because snakes abounded in the area; known in Russian as Zmeyevka; in modern-day Ukraine, its Ukrainian name is Zmi'ivka (Cyrillic alphabet: Зміївка; German rendering Smijiwka): Lutheran when founded in 1803–1805, with a later admixture of Roman Catholic Germans. It now incorporates the area covered by the three other original villages listed above.

By 1886, around the time when large-scale emigration to North America began, the population of the four villages was as follows:

- Alt-Schwedendorf: 515 inhabitants with 65 houses and one Lutheran church
- Klosterdorf: 773 inhabitants with 52 houses and one Roman Catholic chapel
- Mühlhausendorf: 489 inhabitants with 48 houses and one Lutheran prayer house
- Schlangendorf: 474 inhabitants with 46 houses and one Lutheran prayer house

Later, as the original villages' population continued to burgeon, despite overseas emigration, there were Tochterkolonien, i.e. daughter colonies, formed, such as, the following, viz.:

- Friedenheim, founded in 1928
- Hagendorf
- Hoffenthal
- Neu-Klosterdorf, a daughter colony of Klosterdorf (listed above), which was then called in apposition to her offspring, Alt-Klosterdorf. Today this is the village of Kostyrka, not to be confused with the mother village of the same name now subsumed into Zmiivka.
- Neu-Schwedendorf, a daughter colony of Alt-Schwedendorf

During the Second World War, after the German invasion of the Soviet Union on 22 June 1941, the district was occupied by the Wehrmacht, and, in 1942, the inhabitants, both Swedes and Germans whom the Nazis considered together as ethnic Germans (Volksdeutsche, in German) and others (such as Ukrainians), were assessed and inventoried by officers of the Reichssippenamt operating under the direction of Kommando Karl Stumpp, the former historian of the area. As a result of the impending German attack, the Soviet authorities had already exiled many of the adult males among the ethnic German population of the district to areas of refuge and captivity east of the Ural mountains. During the German occupation, the area was officially under the Nazi civil administration of the Reichskommissariat Ukraine until the Soviet Red Army's successful counteroffensive drove the occupation forces, both military and civil, from the region in 1944.

Dr Karl Stumpp and Dr Adam Giesinger both published materials on the settlement and history of the Swedish District and its villages. The historical part of this overview is drawn primarily from Stumpp's The Emigration from Germany to Russia in the Years 1763 to 1862 (English translation from the original German, American Historical Society of Germans from Russia, 1973), and Giesinger's From Catherine to Khrushchev : The Story of Russia's Germans (1974).

=== Glückstal ===
- Glückstal (today Hlinaia, Russian Glinoe/Глиное – Moldova/Transnistria)
- Neudorf (today Carmanova, Russian Karmanowa/Карманова – Moldova/Transnistria)
- Bergdorf (today Kolosova, Russian Kolossowa/Колосова – Kolosova, Ternopil Oblast, Ukraine)
- Kassel (today Velykokomariwka (Komarivka)/Великокомарівка – Ukraine)
  and their daughter colonies:

- Hoffnungstal (today Tsebrykove/Цебрикове – Ukraine)
- Hoffnungsfeld (today Torosove/Торосове (formerly Lenine/Леніне) – Ukraine)
- Klein Neudorf (today Nowoseliwka/Новоселівка – Ukraine)
- Neu-Beresina (today Malosymenowe/Малозименове – Ukraine)
- Neu-Glückstal (today Zybuliwka/Цибулівка – Ukraine)
- Neu-Berlin (today Worobjowe/Воробйове – Ukraine)
- Neu-Kassel (today Sofijiwka/Софіївка – Ukraine)
- Rosenfeld (today Konopljane/Конопляне – Ukraine)
- Gnadenfeld (today Nejkowe/Нейкове – Ukraine)
- Kleinbergdorf (today Crasnoe, Russian Krasnoje/Красное – Moldova/Transnistria)
- Friedenstal (today Tryhrady/Тригради – Ukraine)
- Krontal (destroyed – east of Grigoriopol located in – Moldova/Transnistria)
- Klein-Glückstal (Neu-Glückstal, Klein-Gluckstal, Klein-Glueckstal, Woljtschi, Woltschij, Woltschanowo, Stur(r)pelz, Adolfstal, Volychy, Volchanovo, Volchy, Volanka) - destroyed, near Rymariwka/Римарівка – Ukraine
- Koscharka (today Koscharka/Кошарка – Ukraine)
- Saratow (destroyed, northeast of Koscharka)

=== Kutschurgan ===
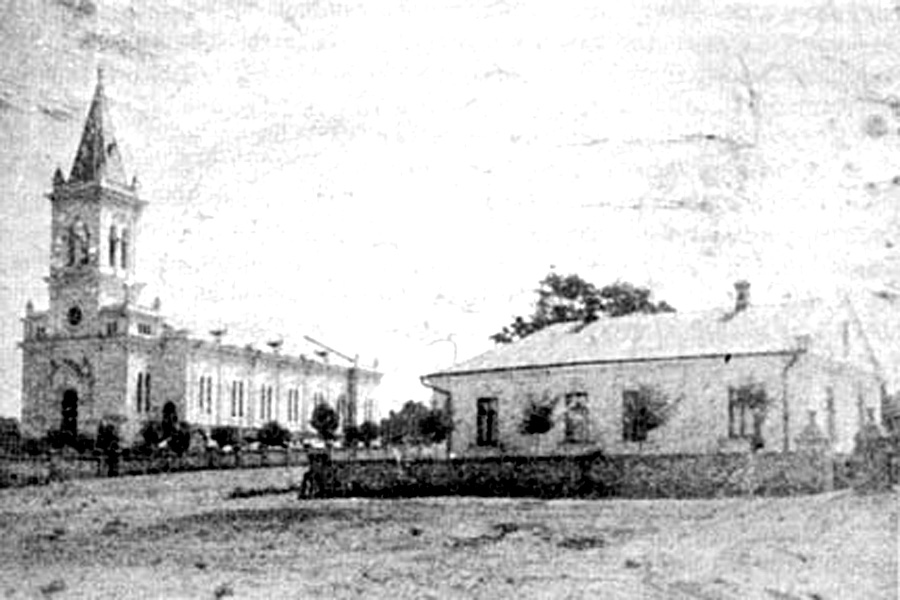
Trinity Church in Kandel (today part of Lymanske)

- Strassburg (today part of Kuchurhan/Кучурган)
- Selz (today part of Lymanske/Лиманське)
- Kandel (today part of Lymanske/Лиманське)
- Baden (today part of Kuchurhan/Кучурган)
- Mannheim (today Kam'yanka/Кам'янка)
- Elsass (today Shcherbanka/Щербанка) and their daughter colonies:

- Ambrose Khutor
- Balmas, Bessarabia
- Bezilajweka
- Bischofsfeld (today Yeremiivka/Єреміївка)
- Bogunskoje
- Brilowa
- Brinnowka
- Dikowa
- Diminski
- Fischer Khutor
- Fischer-Franz Khutor
- Georgental (today Sekretarivka/Секретарівка)
- Jeremejewka
- Johannestal
- Kamenka
- Kaschary
- Kellersheim (destroyed)
- Kosenka
- Koslowka
- Kutschurgan Khutor
- Langenberg
- Larga, Bessarabia
- Linejewka
- Mandrowo
- Marjanowka
- Matischowka
- Miller Khutor
- Milliardowka
- Miroljubowka
- Neu-Baden
- Neu-Elsass
- Neu-Kandel (today Bohunove/Богунове)
- Neu-Mannheim (today Novostepanivka/Новостепанівка)
- Neu-Schlossel Khutor
- Neu-Selz
- Neu-Strassburg
- Nowo-Andreaschewka
- Ponjatowka
- Rosaljewka
- Sachalski
- Schatzen Khutor
- Schemiott
- Schwowe Khutor
- Severinovka
- Stepanowka
- Sturpelz
- Susanowka
- Tschebanka
- Wasiljewka
- Welter Khutor
- Wolkowo

=== Liebental ===
- Liebental (today Velykodolynske/Великодолинське)

(1803 founded by Lutherans from Württemberg)

- Kleinliebental (today Malodolynske/Малодолинське)

(1803 founded by Catholics from Alsace)

- Josefstal (today Yosypivka/Йосипівка)

(1803 founded by Catholics from Alsace)

- Mariental (today Marianivka/Мар'янівка)

(1803 founded by Catholics from Alsace)

- Lustdorf (today a microdistrict of Odesa)

(1805 founded by Württemberger)

- Alexanderhilf (today Dobrooleksandrivka/Доброолександрівка)

(1805/06 founded by Württemberger)

- Neuburg (today Novohradkivka/Новоградківка)

(1806 founded by Württemberger)

- Peterstal (today Petrodolynske/Петродолинське)
- Franzfeld (today Nadlymanske/Надлиманське)
- Annental (today Biliari/Білярі)
- Güldendorf (today Krasnosilka/Красносілка)
- Freudental (today Myrne/Мирне)
  as well as the daughter colonies:

- Friedensfeld (today Sylivka/Силівка)
- Neu-Freudental (today Marynove/Маринове)

=== Beresan ===
Beresan Colony settlements

- Blumenfeld (today Krasnopillya/Краснопілля)
  - Catholic
  - Founded in 1862 by families from the Liebental and Kuchurgan districts (Elsaß, Franzfeld, Kandel, Sulz, Straßburg).
  - Conflicting information as to which colony group it belongs, Liebental or Beresan.
- Landau (today Shyrokolanivka/Широколанівка)
- Speyer (today Pischtschanyj Brid/Піщаний Брід)
- Rohrbach (today Nowoswitliwka/Новосвітлівка)
- Worms (today Wynohradne/Виноградне)
- Sulz (destroyed)
- Karlsruhe (today Stepove, Mykolaiv Raion/Степове)
- Rastadt (today Poritschtschja/Поріччя)
- München (today Poritschtschja/Поріччя)
- Katharinental (today Kateryniwka/Катеринівка)
- Johannestal (today Iwaniwka/Іванівка)
- Waterloo (today Stawky/Ставки)
  as well as the daughter colonies:

- Alexanderfeld (today Berezivka/Березівка)
- Felsenburg (today Welidariwka/Велідарівка)
- Gnadenfeld (today Nejkowe/Нейкове)
- Halbstadt (today Nowoseliwka/Новоселівка)
- Neu Karlsruhe (today Tscherwona Sirka/Червона Зірка)
- Neu Rastadt (today part of Poritschtschja)
- Friedrichstal (destroyed)
- Schönfeld (today Krynychky/Кринички)
- Stuttgart (destroyed)

=== Molotschna ===
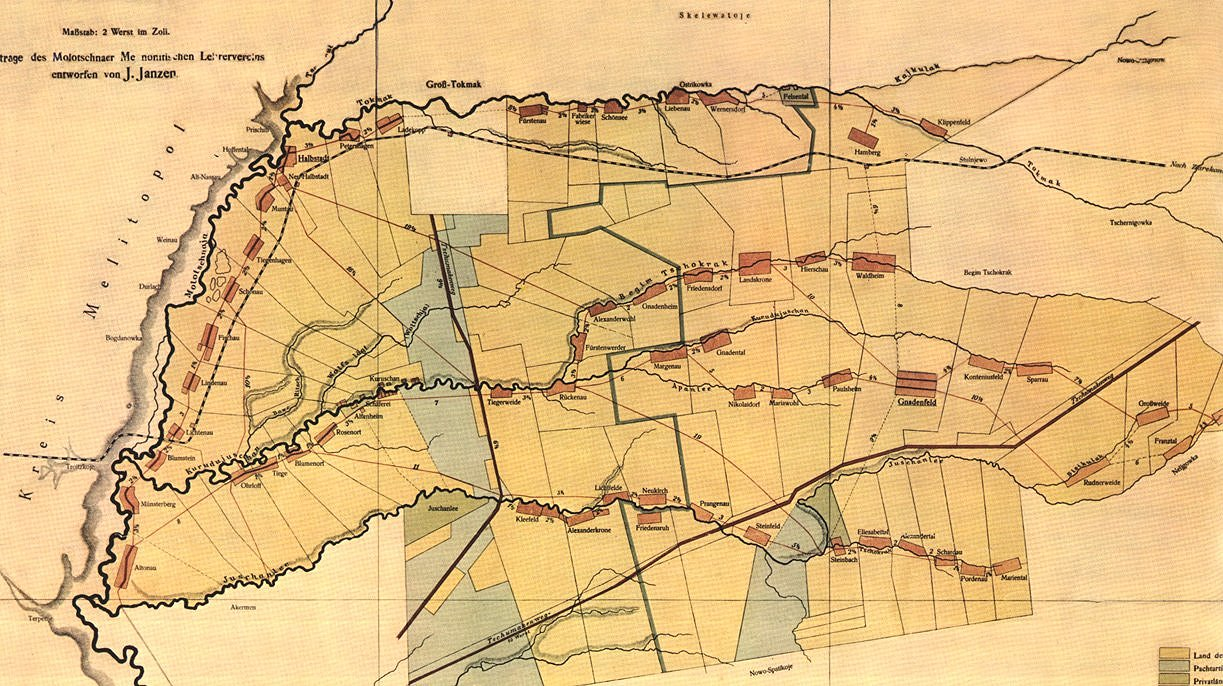
1912 Molotschna Colony map

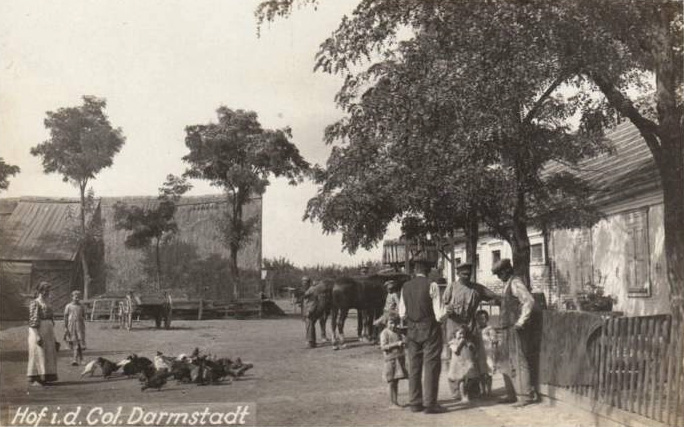
Darmstadt Colony

- Alt-Montal (today Zamozhne
- Alt-Nassau (today Vynohradne/Виноградне)
- Blumental (today Rivne/Рівне)
- Durlach (destroyed, south of Blahodatne/Благодатне)
- Friedrichsfeld (today /ozdolл)
- Grüntal (destroyed, at Tschornosemne/Чорноземне)
- Heidelberg (today Nowohoriwka/Новогорівка)
- Hochheim (today Komsomolske/Комсомольське)
- Hochstädt (today Wyssoke/Високе)
- Hoffental (today part of Molochansk)
- Kostheim (today Pokasne/Показне)
- Kronsfeld (today Marjaniwka/Мар'янівка)
- Leiterhausen (today Traktorne/Тракторне)
- Neu-Montal (today Peremoschne/Переможне)
- Neu-Nassau (today Suwore/Суворе)
- Pryshyb(today part of Molochansk)
- Reichenfeld (today Plodorodne/Плодородне)
- Rosental (today Nowe Pole/Нове Поле)
- Tiefenbrunn (today Chystopillia/uk:Чистопілля (Пологівський район))

(1822 founded by Lutherans from Baden)

- Waldorf (today Schowtnewe/Жовтневе)
- Wasserau (today Wodne/Водне)
- Weinau (today Blahodatne/Благодатне)
- Neudorf (zerstört, south of Wyschnewe/Вишневе)

(already in 1833 disbanded)
- Darmstadt (today Romaschky/Ромашки)
- Kaisertal (today Solota Dolyna/Золота Долина)

=== Colonies in Ekaterinoslav ===
- Billersfeld (today Olexandrivka/Олександрівка)
- Fischersdorf (today Stadtteil Rybalske/Рибальське as part of the Stadtrajons Samara by Dnipro)
- Jamburg (today Dniprove/Дніпрове)
- Josefstal (today Samarivka/Самарівка, largely destroyed) – (Lutherans from Thorn (1780) and Danzig (1789))
- Kronsgarten (southern part of Pidhorodne/Підгородне) – (Frisian Mennonites from Marienburg (1789))
- Mariental/Marienfeld (today Majorka/Майорка)

=== Planer colonies in Mariupol ===
- Eichwald (today Zoriane/Зоряне, formerly Uryzke/Урицьке)
- Göttland (today Marianivka/Мар'янівка)
- Grunau (Alexandronewsk – today in the northeastern part of Rozivka/Розівка)
- Kaiserdorf (today Probudzhennya/Пробудження)
- Kampenau (Kamenske – today southern part of Marianivka/Мар'янівка)
- Kirschwald (today Vyshniuvate/Вишнювате)
- Kronsdorf (Kasjanoselsk – today northern part of Rozivka/Розівка)
- Ludwigstal (today Zorya/Зоря, formerly Romanivka/Романівка, formerly Karla Libknechta/Карла Лібкнехта)
- Mirau (today Myrske/Мирське)
- Neuhof (today Novodvorivka/Новодворівка)
- Reichenberg (today Bahativka/Багатівка)
- Rosenberg (today Rozivka/Розівка)
- Rosengart (Rajhorod – today northern part of Lystvianka/Листвянка)
- Schönbaum (today Lystvianka/Листвянка)
- Tiegenhof (today Azov/Азов)
- Tiegenort (today Antonivka/Антонівка)
- Tiergart (destroyed – northeast of Antonivka)
- Wickerau (today Kuznetsivka/Кузнецівка)

=== Swabia colonies in Berdyansk ===
- Neu-Hoffnung (today the western part of Ossypenko/Осипенко)
- Neu-Hoffnungstal (today Dolynske/Долинське)
- Neu-Stuttgart (today Jelysawetiwka/Єлизаветівка)
- Rosenfeld (today Oleniwka/Оленівка)

=== Miscellaneous colonies ===
- Alt Danzig (today Krupske)
- Colonists district Crimea
- Mennonite colony Molotschna
- Mennonite colony Chortiza
- Daughter colony Kronau

Colonies in Maximovich, South of Donetsk:

- Ostheim (today Telmanowe), daughter settlement of Neu-Hoffnung
- Rosenfeld (today Swobodne)

== Notable people ==
- Fedir Ernst, art historian and museum organizer in Kyiv
- Helene Fischer, German schlager singer
- Jeanna Friske, singer
- Johnny Gottselig, National Hockey League player and coach, The Chicago Black Hawks
- Chris Isaak, American singer and actor
- Georg Leibbrandt, Nazi functionary
- Vyacheslav Polozov, opera singer
- Pyotr Schmidt, Russian naval officer and 1905 revolutionary
- Athanasius Schneider, Auxiliary Roman Catholic Bishop of Nur-Sultan, Kazakhstan, theologian and author
- Anton Shynder, professional football player
- Karl Stumpp, ethnologist and Nazi functionary in German-occupied Ukraine
- Lawrence Welk, musician, bandleader and TV host
- Hayley Wickenheiser, Canadian ice hockey player from Shaunavon, Saskatchewan. Wickenheiser's family immigrated to Western Canada from Odesa in the early part of the 20th century.
- Immanuel Winkler, Pastor in Hoffnungstal, vicar in Kassel and representative of the Black Sea Germans

== See also ==
- Germans in Ukraine
- History of Germans in Russia and the Soviet Union
- Askania-Nova (settlement)
- Baltic Germans
- Ukrainians in Germany
