= Karl Stumpp =

German ethnographer (1896–1982)

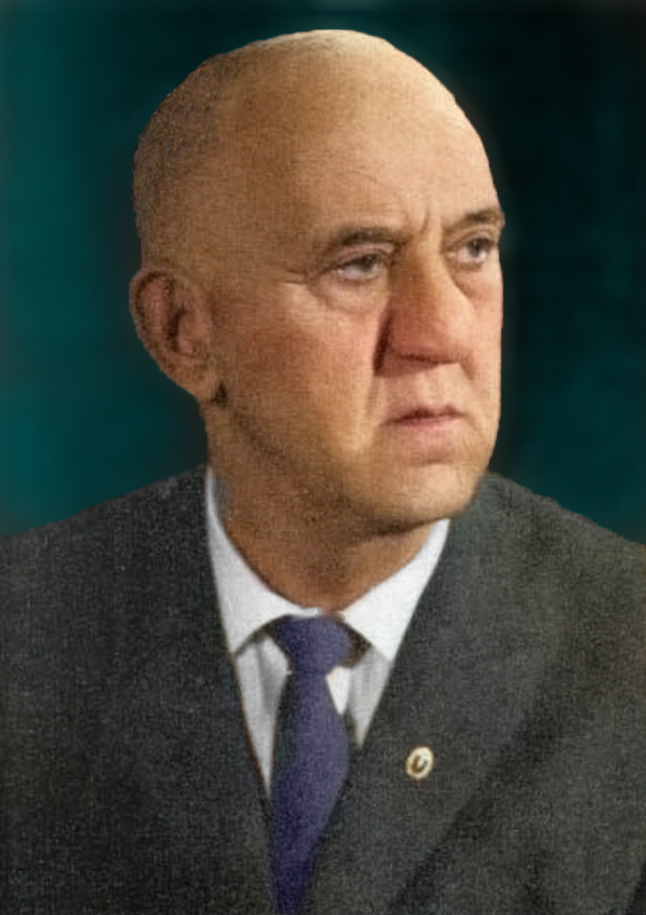

Head of SS Sonderkommando Dr Karl Stumpp, Reich Ministry for the Occupied Eastern Territories
- In office 1941–1943
- Preceded by: Position established
- Succeeded by: None

Personal details
- Born: 12 May 1896 Alexanderhilf, Kherson Governorate, Russian Empire
- Died: 20 January 1982 (aged 85) Stuttgart, Federal Republic of Germany
- Party: National Socialist German Workers' Party (NSDAP)
- Profession: ethnographer, teacher, scholar, writer
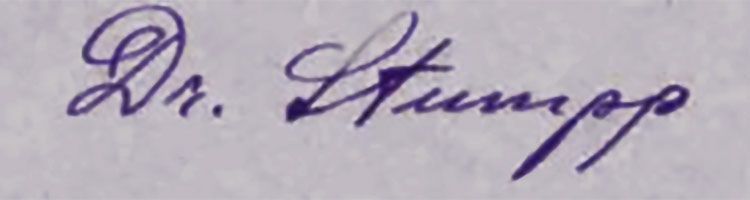
- Signature

Karl Stumpp (12 May 1896 – 20 January 1982) was a German ethnographer of Black Sea German origin who devoted himself to the study of Germans in Eastern Europe and Southeastern Europe, especially those from the lands of the former Russian Empire. Starting out as a pre-war academic and teacher, during the German-Soviet portion of World War II, he led Special Command Unit Dr Karl Stumpp (also called in German: SS Sonderkommando Dr Karl Stumpp), which had been named after him in honour of his prior work on Russian German ethnology. This operation sought to classify the inhabitants of ethnic German and Swedish settlements whom the Nazis favoured. It also classified those of other ethnicities including Ukrainians and Jews. In the postwar period, Stumpp escaped punishment for his wartime service to the Nazi regime. Instead, he returned to teaching and served as the long-time chairman of the Association of Germans from Russia, travelling to North America to visit and lecture to the Russian German diaspora communities there.

== Early life ==
Stumpp was born to ethnic German parents in Alexanderhilf, near Odessa, in Kherson Governorate of the Russian Empire. At an early age he emigrated to Germany for his studies.

Stumpp's parents were Jakob Stumpp (1864–1918) and his wife Katharina nee König (1864–1945). After graduating from the German high school in Odessa, Stumpp studied from 1918 to 1922 at the Eberhard Karls University in Tübingen. There he participated in the founding of the Association of those studying German Colonists.

== Professional life ==
Since Stumpp's home village was now part of the Ukrainian Socialist Soviet Republic, he could not return. Instead, he went to neighbouring Bessarabia in Romania. From 1922 to 1933, he was a teacher at the senior girls' school in Tarutino. He voluntarily examined the history of Bessarabian Germans through enquiries in church documents and parish registers. From the villages, he requested the names of the persons who had emigrated from Bessarabia. Likewise, he made surveys on the land area of the Bessarabian Germans. Stumpp gave lectures to the ethnic German population in Bessarabia and founded a university library in Tarutino, which led to the establishment of German-language libraries in other Bessarabian German settlements. In 1922, he completed his dissertation in geography and natural sciences.

== Involvement in Nazi Ethnographical Programmes ==
In 1933, Stumpp went to Nazi Germany, where he served as national director of the Volksbund für das Deutschtum im Ausland in Stuttgart until 1938. He then headed the Russian-German office of the Deutsches Ausland-Institut (German Foreign Institute) in Stuttgart. He was also an employee at the Forschungsstelle des Russlanddeutschtums in Berlin. In 1937, he became a member of the Nazi party.

During the German-Soviet campaign and occupation, Stumpp carried out ethnological and genealogical investigations in ethnic-German villages of occupied Ukraine on behalf of the Reich Ministry for the Occupied Eastern Territories, or the Ostministerium. His superior in the Ostministerium in Berlin was Georg Leibbrandt, who in the summer of 1941 reorganized his research unit into the Sonderkommando Dr. Karl Stumpp. This 80-member special unit named for and led by Stumpp operated as a semi-military unit from summer 1941 to summer 1943 in occupied Ukraine. In 1942, Stumpp also served as head of a "Sippenkunde und Volksbiologie" Sonderkommando under the Reichskommissariat Ukraine. This Sonderkommando was attached to the Reichsleiter Rosenberg Taskforce (ERR) and was responsible for confiscating materials such as church records and civil registers for the purposes of "research into the composition and origins of Germanity in the Ukraine".

He made "village reports" to more than 300 villages in the area occupied by the German Army. The detailed demographic, cultural and racial studies for the Nazi bureaucracy and the SS, by ethnically categorizing village inhabitants, established a basis for the mass murder of Ukrainian Jews. Many of his later works were based on these studies and the confiscated archival materials.

In 1941, Stumpp came into contact with the assassination of the Jews by Einsatzgruppen C and D and their helpers in Ukraine and Transnistria (Romanian occupation area). Stumpp is accused of having set up a list of 42,000 "unsustainable Jews " in his ethnological research. He has also been accused of having participated in the murder of Jews. In his diary entry of August 6, 1941, Stumpp spoke of the "liberation of Germany and Europe from the Bolshevik Jewish plague" for which German soldiers sacrificed their lives. He went on to write in the same entry that "a light was shining" on a young air force lieutenant from Leningrad when he realized that "no Jew" was risking his life as a pilot on the Red Army, "because it involves courage".

== Post-war life ==
Stumpp escaped any repercussions for his involvement in the apparatus of the Nazi-occupation of Ukraine during World War II.

In the post-war period, he returned to teaching as a high school teacher in Tübingen until 1957 and resumed his earlier studies on the subject of the Russian Germans, making expert contributions as editor of Volk auf dem Weg [People on the way], the organ of the Association of Germans from Russia (the Landsmannschaft der Deutschen aus Russland, which might be literally translated as the "Cultural Association of Germans from Russia") until his death in Stuttgart on 20 January 1982.

== Post-war German Federal Republican Honours ==
- Federal Cross of Merit 1st Class (1966) [8]
- Medal of Merit of the Institute for Foreign Cultural Relations (1975)

== Publications ==
- From the Original Homeland and emigration of the Germans from Bessarabien.
- 1938 Yearbook for Foreign Germans.
- East migration of the Württemberger 1816 to 1822.
- The emigration from Germany to Russia in the years 1763 to 1862. 1974 [1] .
- The Germans from Russia - two hundred years on the road. 1965th
- A life for my people.
- Home Calendar of the Bessarabian Germans 1978, Hannover 1978.

== Literature ==
- Schmaltz, Eric J.; Sinner, Samuel D. (2000). "The Nazi Ethnographic Research of Georg Leibbrandt and Karl Stumpp in Ukraine, and Its North American Legacy". Holocaust and Genocide Studies. 14 (1). Oxford University Press: 28–64. doi:10.1093/hgs/14.1.28. ISSN 1476-7937. PMID 20684096.
