= Kuchurhan, Velyka Mykhailivka settlement hromada, Rozdilna Raion, Odesa Oblast =

Kuchurhan Кучурган
- Village
- Location of Kuchurhan Kuchurhan (Ukraine)
- Coordinates: 47°09′37″N 29°47′33″E
- Country: Ukraine
- Oblast: Odesa Oblast
- Raion: Rozdilna Raion
- Hromada: Velyka Mykhailivka settlement hromada
- Elevation: 50 m (160 ft)

Population (2001)
  - Total: 96
- Time zone: UTC+2 (EET)
  - Summer (DST): UTC+3 (EEST)
- Postal code: 67110
- Area code: +380 4859

Kuchurhan (Ukrainian: Кучурган; Romanian: Cuciurgan) is a village in Rozdilna Raion, Odesa Oblast, Ukraine. It belongs to Velyka Mykhailivka settlement hromada, one of the hromadas of Ukraine.

== History ==
Kuchurhan was founded in 1815. In 1945, by the Decree of the PVS of the Ukrainian SSR, Lyakhy was renamed Pridorozhnyi, which in turn was renamed Kuchurhan.

Until 18 July 2020, Kuchurhan was located in Velyka Mykhailivka Raion. The raion was abolished in July 2020 as part of the administrative reform of Ukraine, which reduced the number of raions of Odesa Oblast to seven. The area of Velyka Mykhailivka Raion was merged into Rozdilna Raion.

== Demographics ==
According to the 1989 Soviet census, the population of Kuchurhan was 92 people, of whom 36 were men and 52 women.

According to the 2001 Ukrainian census, 92 people lived in the village.

=== Languages ===
According to the 2001 census, the primary languages of the inhabitants of Kuchurhan were:

Language	Percentage
Ukrainian	78.02 %
Moldovan (Romanian)	5.49 %
