= Velyka Mykhailivka Raion =

Former subdivision of Odesa Oblast, Ukraine

Coordinates: 47°05′N 30°00′E

Velyka Mykhailivka Raion Великомихайлівський район
- Raion
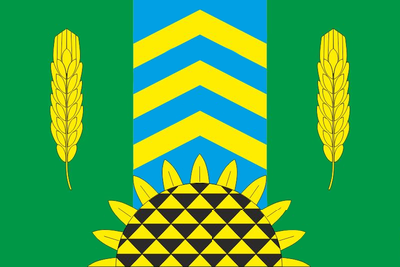
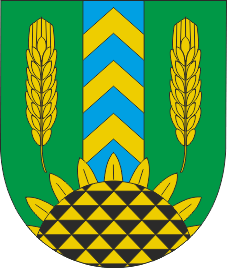
- Flag Coat of arms

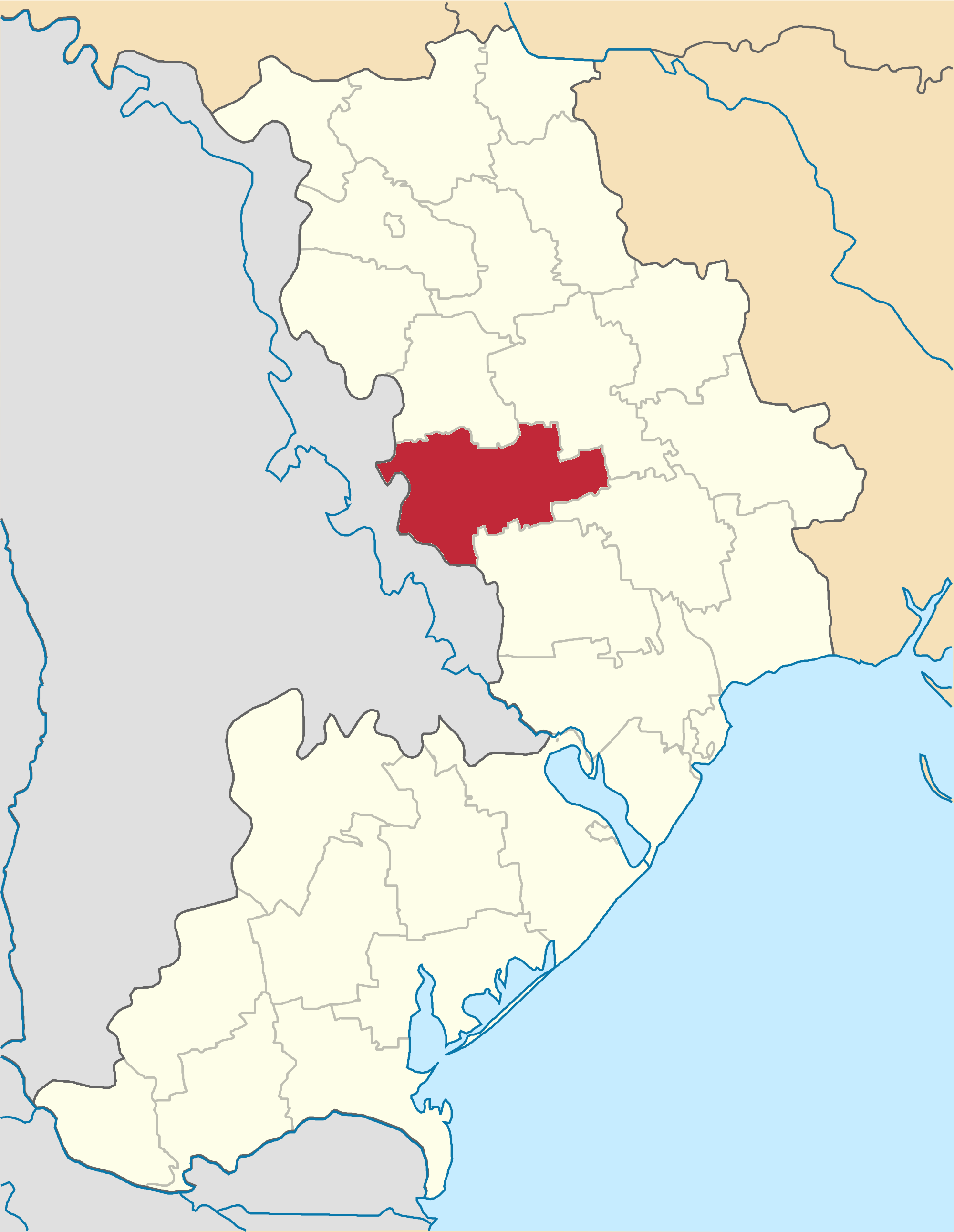
- Country: Ukraine
- Oblast: Odesa Oblast
- Established: 1945
- Disestablished: 18 July 2020
- Admin. center: Velyka Mykhailivka
- Subdivisions: List: 0 — city councils; 2 — settlement councils; 22 — rural councils; Number of localities: 0 — cities; 2 — urban-type settlements; 79 — villages; 1 — rural settlements

Government
  - Governor: Myhaylo Vyshnyakov

Area
  - Total: 1,436 km^{2} (554 sq mi)

Population (2020)
  - Total: 30,166 ▲
  - Density: 21.01/km^{2} (54.41/sq mi)
- Time zone: UTC+02:00 (EET)
  - Summer (DST): UTC+03:00 (EEST)
- Postal index: 67100—67154
- Area code: +380 4859
- Website: http://v-mihailivka-rda.odessa.gov.ua

Velyka Mykhailivka Raion (Ukrainian: Великомихайлівський район) was a raion (district) in Odesa Oblast of Ukraine. Its administrative center was the urban-type settlement of Velyka Mykhailivka. The raion was abolished on 18 July 2020 as part of the administrative reform of Ukraine, which reduced the number of raions of Odesa Oblast to seven. The area of Velyka Mykhailivka Raion was merged into Rozdilna Raion. The last estimate of the raion population was 30,166 (2020 est.).

== History ==
The area was settled after 1792, when the lands between the Southern Bug and the Dniester were transferred to Russia according to the Iasi Peace Treaty. In particular, the settlement of Hrosulove was founded in 1793. The area was included in Tiraspol Uyezd, which belonged to Yekaterinoslav Viceroyalty until 1795, Voznesensk Viceroyalty until 1796, Novorossiya Governorate until 1803, and Kherson Governorate until 1920.

On 16 April 1920, Odesa Governorate split off, and Odessky Uyezd was moved to Odesa Governorate. In 1923, uyezds in Ukrainian Soviet Socialist Republic were abolished, and the governorates were divided into okruhas. Hrosulove was included into Odesa Okruha. On 7 March 1923 Hrosulove Raion with the administrative center in Hrosulove was established. In 1930, okruhas were abolished, and on 27 February 1932, Odesa Oblast was established, and Hrosulove Raion was included into Odesa Oblast. In 1946, Hrosulove was renamed Velyka Mykhailivka, and Hrosulove Raion was renamed Velyka Mykhailivka Raion.

On 7 March 1923 Tsebrykove Raion with the administrative center in Tsebrykove was established as well. On 30 December 1962 Tsebrykove Raion was abolished and merged into Velyka Mykhailivka Raion.

== Administrative divisions ==
At the time of disestablishment, the raion consisted of four hromadas:

- Novoborysivka rural hromada with the administration in the selo of Novoborysivka;
- Tsebrykove settlement hromada with the administration in the urban-type settlement of Tsebrykove;
- Velyka Mykhailivka settlement hromada with the administration in Velyka Mykhailivka;
- Velykoploske rural hromada with the administration in the selo of Velykoploske.

According to the 2001 census, the majority of the population of the Velîka Mîhailivka district was Ukrainian -speaking (80.36%), with Russian (15.36%) and Romanian (2.95%) speakers in the minority.
