= Velykokomarivka =

Velykokomarivka Великокомарівка
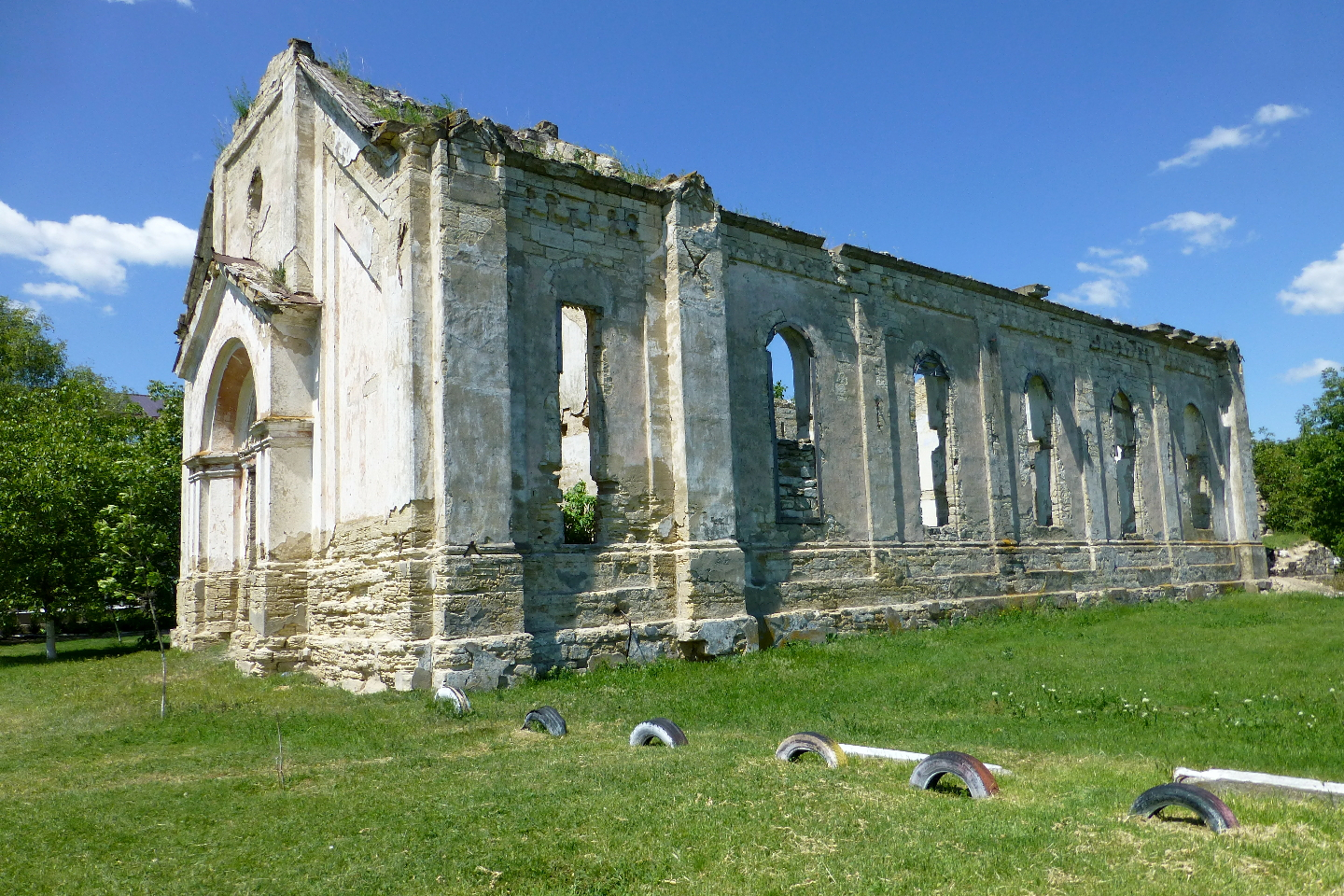
- Kassel German Evangelical Church
- Interactive map of Velykokomarivka
- Location in Ukraine Velykokomarivka (Odesa Oblast)
- Coordinates: 47°9′36″N 29°34′48″E
- Country: Ukraine
- Oblast: Odesa Oblast
- Raion: Rozdilna Raion
- Hromada: Velyka Mykhailivka settlement hromada
- Time zone: UTC+2 (EET)
  - Summer (DST): UTC+3 (EEST)

Velykokomarivka (Ukrainian: Великокомарівка) is a village in Rozdilna Raion of Odesa Oblast (province) of southern Ukraine. It belongs to Velyka Mykhailivka settlement hromada, one of the hromadas of Ukraine. It was founded in 1810 with the name Kassel and later renamed as Velykokomarivka.

== Geography ==
Velykokomarivka is in the Odesa Oblast subdivision (province) of western Ukraine, just east of the Moldovan border and about 130 kilometres northwest of the city of Odesa.

== History ==
Velykokomarivka was founded as Kassel in 1810. It is part of the Bergdorf, Glückstal, Kassel, Neudorf area, then part of the Kherson Governorate, which was allocated by the Imperial Russian government to German immigrants who left certain areas of Germany/Hungary (Hesse, Baden, Württemberg (now Baden-Württemberg), Alsace (now part of France), the Palatinate, or Hungary) between 1808 and 1810. The immigrants who founded Kassel were all Protestants, the majority Evangelical [Lutheran], a minority Reformed. Tsar Alexander I encouraged immigration from many countries into this area, which was acquired from the Ottoman Empire in 1804. The Germans were fleeing the oppressive occupation of southwest Germany by Napoleon's armies (until his defeat at Waterloo in 1815). Although the Russians discouraged the practice of any religion other than Russian Orthodoxy, the official church of Russia, Tsar Alexander I granted religious freedom and other special privileges, such as local autonomy and temporary tax relief, to the German immigrants. In 1871, Tsar Alexander II revoked some of the special privileges (including exemption from military service) originally granted to the German immigrants by Tsar Alexander I, and shortly after that many of them began to migrate to the United States, especially to the Dakota Territory.

Until 18 July 2020, Velykokomarivka belonged to Velyka Mykhailivka Raion. The raion was abolished in July 2020 as part of the administrative reform of Ukraine, which reduced the number of raions of Odesa Oblast to seven. The area of Velyka Mykhailivka Raion was merged into Rozdilna Raion.
