= Brzegi Dolne =

Brzegi Dolne Береги Долішні, Berehy Dolishni
- Village

Berehy Dolishni transcription(s)
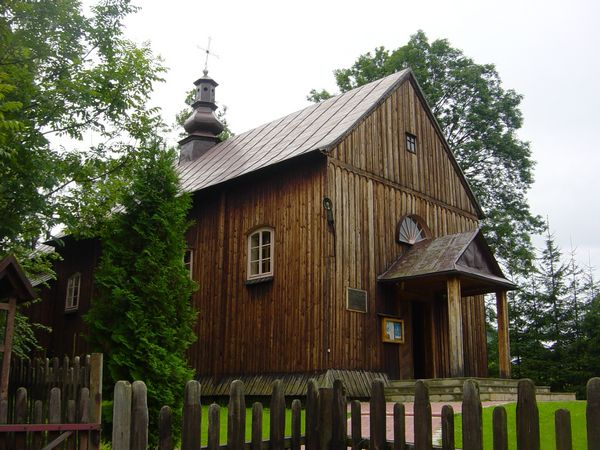
- Greek Catholic church of Archangel Michael

- Location within Poland
- Coordinates: 49°27′N 22°37′E
- Country: Poland
- Voivodeship: Subcarpathian
- County: Bieszczady
- Gmina: Ustrzyki Dolne
- Established: 1532

Brzegi Dolne [ˈbʐɛɡʲi ˈdɔlnɛ] (Ukrainian: Береги Долішні, romanized: Berehy Dolišni) is a boyko village in the administrative district of Gmina Ustrzyki Dolne, within Bieszczady County, Subcarpathian Voivodeship, in south-eastern Poland.

The village was established in 1532 on Vlach law. The privilege for the serfdom of the village was issued by King Sigismund August to the brothers Dmytro and Stets. In 1544, the village passed into the ownership of Ivan Kunashevych. The village was part of the so-called Stervyaz land of the Peremyshl Land of the Ruthenian Voivodeship.

From 1772 to 1918, the village was part of the Austro-Hungarian monarchy, in the province of the Kingdom of Galicia and Lodomeria.

In 1784, as part of the Josephine colonization, Austrian authorities settled German colonists in a part of the village, which was named Siegenthal colony. In 1940, the German colonists were deported to Warthegau under the "Heim ins Reich" program.

In 1872, the First Hungarian-Galician Railway was laid through the village.

The village of Berehy Dolishni is one of the oldest centers of oil extraction in the world, where oil has been extracted since 1884.

From 1919 to 1939, it was part of the Gmina Kroscienko in the Dobromil Povit of Lviv Voivodeship.

From 1940 to 1951, the village belonged to the Nyzhno-Ustrytsk district of Drohobych Oblast, Ukraine. In the framework of the 1951 Polish–Soviet territorial exchange, all Ukrainian population was forcibly resettled. 170 families were relocated to the Molotov Kolkhoz (in Zmiivka village, Berislavskyi district, Kherson Oblast).

From 1975 to 1998, the village belonged to Krosno Voivodeship.

== Population ==
According to the 1921 census, the village had 162 houses and 1018 inhabitants (689 Ukrainian Greek Catholics, 171 Evangelicals, 136 Roman Catholics, and 22 Jews).

As of January 1, 1939, the village had 1530 inhabitants, including 1030 Ukrainian Greek Catholics, 100 Ukrainian Roman Catholics, 160 Poles (migrant workers in the forestry industry), 20 Jews, 40 Roma, and 180 Germans (in the settlement of Siegenthal).

n 1951, as part of the territory exchange agreement, all Ukrainian population (223 families, 1055 individuals) was relocated to the east, particularly to the village of Zmiivka in Berislavskyi district of Kherson Oblast, to the Molotov Kolkhoz — 170 families. Polish families from Belz and Sokal were resettled to the village.

== The Church of Archangel Michael ==
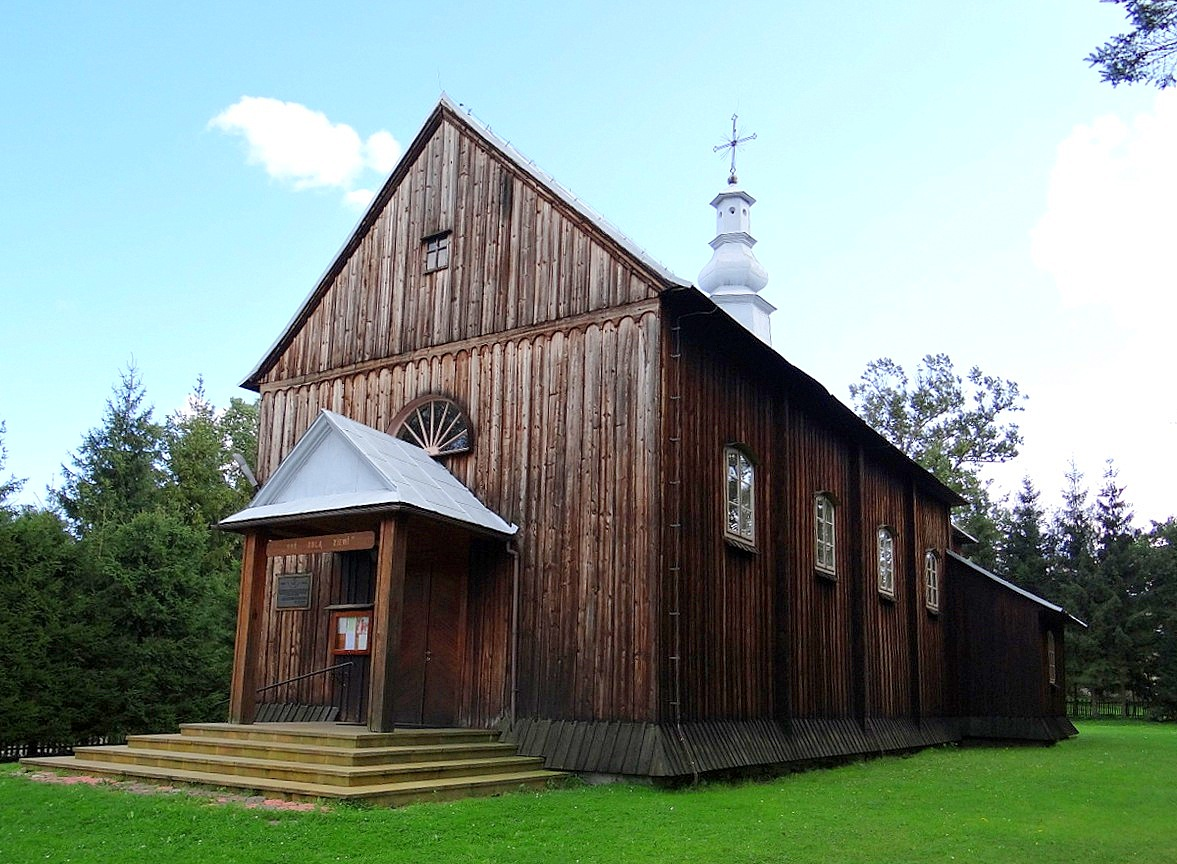
The ancient Ukrainian church of St. Archangel Michael, built in 1844

The Church of Archangel Michael (now the Polish Church of Our Lady of the Rosary) is a Greek Catholic church, built of wood in 1844 on the site of a previous church (first mentioned in 1615). It was a parish church and belonged to the Ustryky Deanery of the Peremyshl Eparchy of the Ukrainian Greek Catholic Church. The church is located in the western part of the village.

The church has been included in the national register of historical monuments.

Built in 1844, the church underwent renovations in 1884, 1909, and 1922.

After the village was transferred to Poland, the church was used as a warehouse. In 1973, it was handed over to the local Roman Catholic community as a parish church (renamed in honor of the Virgin Mary), and in 1978, it was renovated.

The original polychrome decoration on the walls of the church has been preserved. To the west of the church, there is a bell tower, built at the same time as the church.

By the road, there is a brick chapel from the 19th century, covered with a gable roof.

== Notable people ==
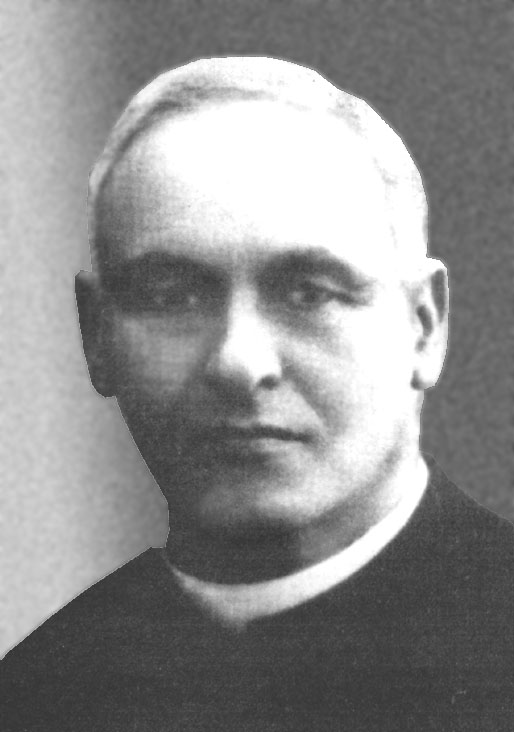
Fr. Mykhailo Zybrytskyi

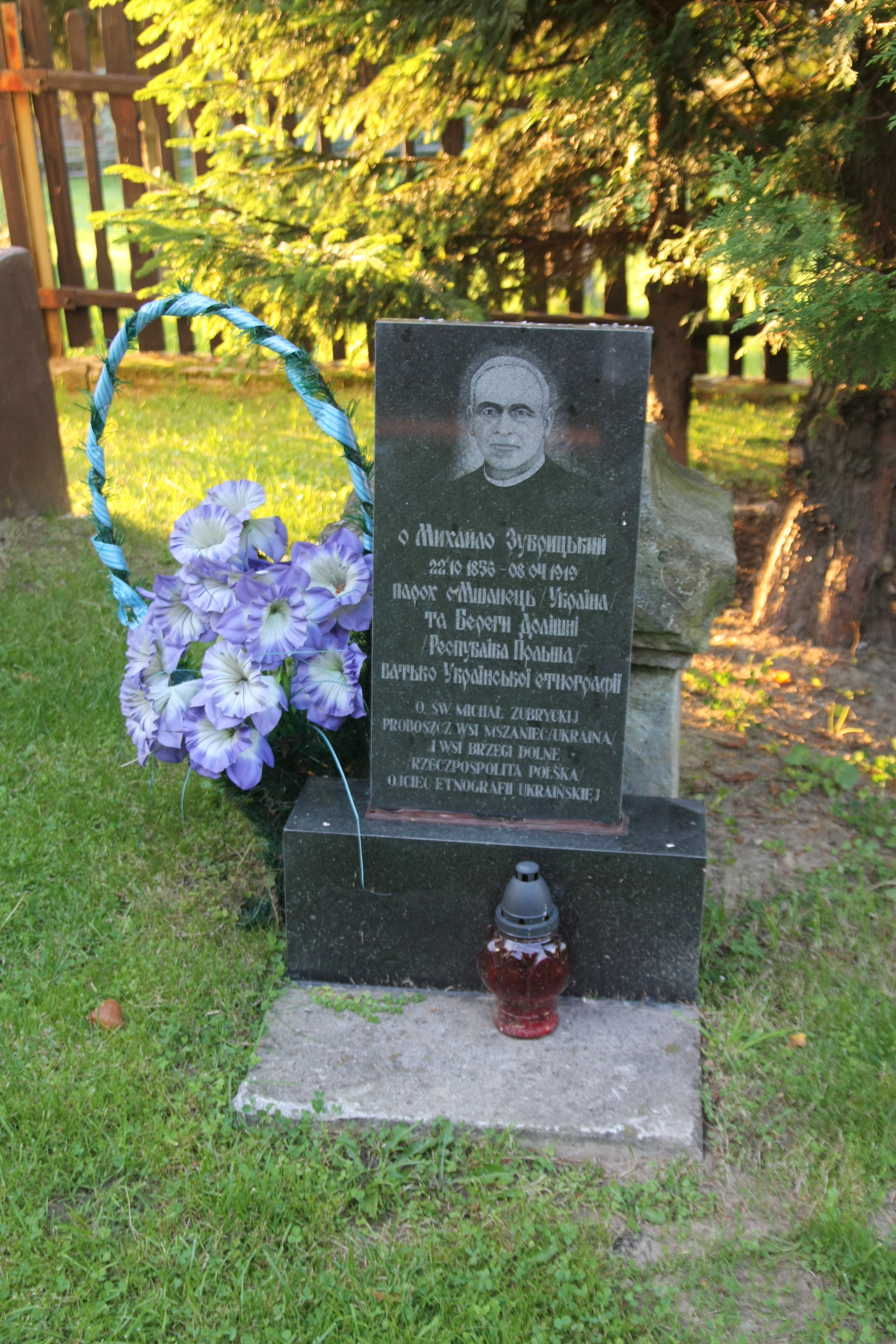
The grave of Father Mykhailo Zubrytsky is in the churchyard.

From 1914 until his death in 1919, Father Mykhailo Zubrytskyi lived and actively worked in the village — he was a renowned Ukrainian ethnographer, folklorist, educator, historian, journalist, public figure, and a Greek-Catholic priest. He is buried in the local cemetery.
