= Novi Butory =

Settlement in Odesa Oblast, Ukraine

Novi Butory Нові Бутори
- Location in Ukraine Novi Butory (Ukraine)
- Coordinates: 47°5′29″N 29°31′50″E
- Country: Ukraine
- Oblast: Odesa Oblast
- Raion: Rozdilna Raion
- Hromada: Velyka Mykhailivka settlement hromada

Population (2001)
  - Total: 153
- Postal code: 67114

Novi Butory (Ukrainian: Нові Бутори) is a village in the Velyka Mykhailivka settlement hromada, in Rozdilna Raion, Odesa Oblast, Ukraine.

The village had 153 inhabitants in 2001. In the 2001 Ukrainian census, 119 (77.78%) people declared "Moldovan" (Romanian) as their mother language, 29 (18.95%) declared Ukrainian and 5 (3.27%) declared Russian.

A native of the village, Ivan Talpa, was a recipient of the 3rd class of Ukraine's Order for Courage. Having fought at the war in Donbas, he was wounded at the battle of Ilovaisk in 2014. He later joined the 28th Mechanized Brigade and continued to fight during the full-scale Russian invasion of Ukraine, dying in the area of Pokrovsk on 1 September 2024. His funeral was held five days later in Lviv, and he was buried at the Lychakiv Cemetery.
