= Immanuel Winkler =

Adolf Immanuel Mathäus Winkler (June 3, 1886 in Sarata – June 18, 1932 in Winnipeg) was a pastor in Hoffnungstal (now Tsebrykove, Ukraine) and author. During World War I, Winkler worked for the rights of Germans in Russia.

== Life ==
Immanuel Winkler was the first of thirteen children born to Matthaeus Winkler and his wife Elisabethe Katharina née Schwarzmann. His great-grandparents were followers of the Roman Catholic priest Ignaz Lindl. In 1822 they emigrated to Bessarabia for religious reasons.

Pastor Winkler attended the school in Sarata from 1899 to 1902 and transferred for Novgorod to complete his secondary (high) school education in 1904. From 1904 to 1909 he studied theology at the Imperial University Yuriev in Dorpat. He was ordained on November 6, 1911, in the Evangelical Lutheran Church and was named pastor of the Hoffnungstal Parish and vicar in Kassel (today, Velykokomarivka) until 1918. Both parishes were in the Glückstal district near Odessa.

In 1915, during World War I, young Pastor Winkler was conscripted as a military chaplain. He was sent back home after six months due to his expressed pro-German feelings. Approximately one year later, as a result of his continued German spirit and convictions, he received an order to leave Hoffnungstal and move 100 km (62 miles) to the east. This order was revoked through the intersession of a high official in Odessa. However, after a few months, shortly after his marriage to Felicia Henriette von Holmbald (daughter of real council of state (Wirklicher Staatsrat) Franz-Julius von Holmblad), he received another order to leave Hoffnungstal. This order required him to move 1500 km to the east to the city of Saratov. Here he stayed with other pastors, mostly Baltic pastors. In 1917 he was allowed to move to Kharkov where his oldest son, Bernhard, was born.

The February 1917 Revolution, with the overthrow of the Tsarist government and resulting March 1917 proclamation of civil rights for all inhabitants of the Russian Empire, raised the hopes of the German population for an improvement in their situation. Specifically, they anticipated a withdrawal of the settlement laws of 1915 and just compensation for damages and losses as well as approval for use of the German language as the official language of instruction in schools and churches and the reinstitution of autonomy and minority rights in the newly created Russian state.

Subsequent dissatisfaction with the actions of the government awakened feelings of solidarity and a willingness to work together. The German colonists came to realize that consistent representation of their interests could not be expected from the existing political parties. The work of the German deputy to the Tsar's Duma and that of professor Karl Lindemann experiences with the activities of the government after 1915 contributed significantly to the colonists dissatisfaction. The colonists began a series of meetings, across the Black Sea coast. On March 18, 1917, colonist representatives met in Odessa to organize a provisional government. They were joined on March 28, by representatives of the "All-Russian Federation of Russian Germans" ("Allrussischer Bund russischer Deutscher"). Representatives of the Odessa committee then sent organizers to conduct meetings and promote the creation of local committees in the major towns and cities of the region.

== Political career ==
=== The Crown colony of Crimea-Taurida ===
Johannes Schleuning, representative of the Volga colonists campaigned for the protection of the German Empire and the right for a reverse migration to Germany. Pastor Immanuel Winkler, in the meantime, chairman of the main committee of the "All-Russian Federation of Russian Germans" campaigned for the creation of a "Crown Colony Crimea-Taurida". His goal was for all the colonists of Russia (southern Ukraine, Bessarabia, Crimea) to settle under the protection of Germany in the Crimea. Further, Winkler called for the inclusion of this colony in the German Empire and the granting of German nationality to the colonists.

Winkler presented his plan to Friedrich von Lindequist, the settlement politician and former Secretary of State, Erich Ludendorff, first General Quartermaster of the Supreme Army Command, and government officials in Berlin in March 1918. His proposal would have resulted in the creation of a colonial state by Germany with development of a naval base in the Crimea. This German presence in the area would have resulted in an increase in German influence in the Caucasus and the Middle East.

After an initial expression of interest the plan it was rejected by the Privy Council, on 2 July 1918, stating that in the eventuality of war Germany would not be able to defend the colony. Winkler's proposal for a mass naturalization of the colonists was also rejected due to German policy that citizenship was granted only on an individual basis and to specific groups of people, i.e., persons who served the German Empire (recruits for the military and their immediate family members.) Following the collapse of the German Empire in November 1918 and the withdrawal of German and Austrian troops, representatives of the Russian Germans finally abandoned their plans.

Now, traces of Immanuel Winkler blur. Probably, he fled to Germany after the withdrawal of German and Austrian troops, where in 1920 his daughter Irene and second son Gerhard were born in Frankfurt an der Oder. In July 1927 he immigrated with his family to Canada, where he took his life on June 18, 1932 in Winnipeg, Manitoba.

== Publications ==
- Kalender für die deutschen Kolonisten in Russland: auf das Jahr: 1918, Petrograd, 1917, 128 S.
- Hauskalender für die deutschen Kolonisten in Rußland, Berlin, 1919

== Bibliography ==
- Wolfdieter Biehl: Die Kaukasus-Politik der Mittelmächte II. Die Zeit der versuchten Kaukasischen Staatlichkeit (1917-1918): TEIL II, Boehlau Verlag, 1992, ISBN 3205055179
- Alfred Eisfeld: Deutsche Kolonien an der Wolga 1917-1919 und das Deutsche Reich, Harrassowitz, 1985, ISBN 978-3447025119
- Christian Fieß (Hrsg.): Sarata 1822-1940, Mühlacker, 1979
- Lydia Klötzel: Die Russlanddeutschen zwischen Autonomie und Auswanderung: Die Geschicke einer nationalen Minderheit vor dem Hintergrund Des wechselhaften deutsch-sowjetischen/russischen Verhältnisses, LIT, 1999, ISBN 978-3825836658
- Anna Schrenk: Mein Erlebnis im evangelischen Pfarrhaus in Russland, DAI film T81-634, frame 5435004
- Joachim Tauber: "Kollaboration" in Nordosteuropa, Erscheinungsformen und Deutungen im 20. Jahrhundert, Harrassowitz, 2006, ISBN 978-3447053679

== See also ==
- Russian Revolution
- Exclusive protectorate treaty
- Treaty of Brest-Litovsk
- Soviet Russia
