= Velyka Mykhailivka settlement hromada =

Coordinates: 47°04′42″N 29°51′12″E

Velyka Mykhailivka settlement hromada Великомихайлівська селищна громада
- Hromada
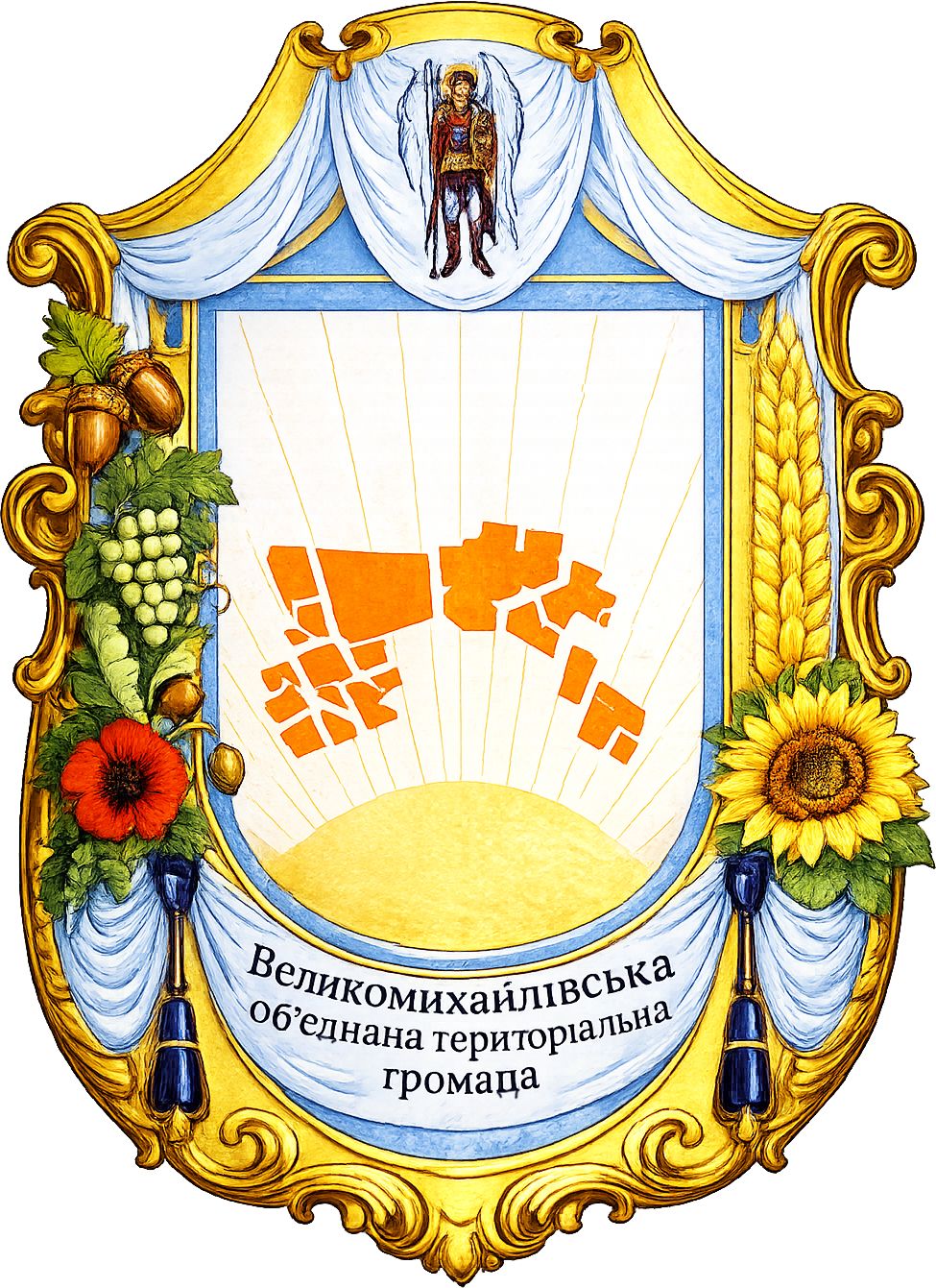
- Coat of arms
- Interactive map of Velyka Mykhailivka settlement hromada
- Country: Ukraine
- Oblast: Odesa Oblast
- Raion: Rozdilna Raion
- Admin. center: Tsebrykove

Area
  - Total: 494.4 km^{2} (190.9 sq mi)

Population (2022)
  - Total: 13,295
  - Density: 26.89/km^{2} (69.65/sq mi)
- CATOTTG code: UA51140010000090773
- Settlements: 29
- Rural settlements: 1
- Villages: 28
- Website: http://vms-rada.gov.ua

Velyka Mykhailivka settlement hromada (Ukrainian: Великомихайлівська селищна громада) is a hromada in Rozdilna Raion of Odesa Oblast in southwestern Ukraine. Population: 13,295 (2022 estimate)

The hromada consists of a rural settlement of Velyka Mykhailivka and 28 villages:

- Bahacheve
- Bessarabka
- Hirzhove
- Hirske
- Hrebenyky
- Hrushka
- Divotske
- Frasyne
- Kardamycheve
- Komarivka
- Kuchurhan
- Muratove
- Novi Butory
- Novooleksandrivka
- Novopetrivka
- Novoselivka
- Platonivka
- Polezne
- Soshe-Ostrivske
- Stoianove
- Trokhymivka
- Trudomyrivka
- Vakarske
- Vasylivka
- Velykokomarivka
- Vodiane
- Yermishkove
- Yurkivka

== Links ==
- Великомихайлівська селищна ОТГ // Облікова картка на офіційному вебсайті Верховної Ради України.
- http://decentralization.gov.ua/gromada/6#
- Одеська обласна рада своїм рішенням створила сім об'єднаних територіальних громад
- http://gromada.info/gromada/velikomihajlivska/
- http://atu.minregion.gov.ua/ua/ustriy_page/9346875924356891
