= Siegenthal =

Abandoned village in Poland

- Village
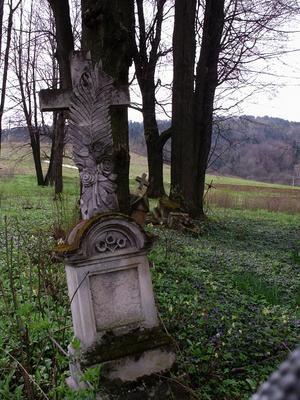
- Old Lutheran cemetery

- Location within Poland
- Coordinates: 49°27′38″N 22°37′52″E
- Country: Poland
- Voivodeship: Subcarpathian
- County: Bieszczady
- Gmina: Ustrzyki Dolne

Siegenthal was a village (a colony) in the vicinity of what is now Brzegi Dolne, in the administrative district of Gmina Ustrzyki Dolne, within Bieszczady County, Subcarpathian Voivodeship, in south-eastern Poland.

The settlement was established in the course of Josephine colonization by Lutheran Germans settlers in 1788. They belonged to the Lutheran parish in Bandrów, but maintained a school during winter with one teacher. They left during World War II. In the years 1945-1951 the area belonged to the Soviet Union, later to Poland. It was eventually depopulated and abandoned in 1946. There are remnants of a Lutheran cemetery.
