= Zmiivka =

Rural locality in Kherson Oblast, Ukraine

Coordinates: 46.8703°N 33.5831°E

Zmiivka Зміївка
- Village
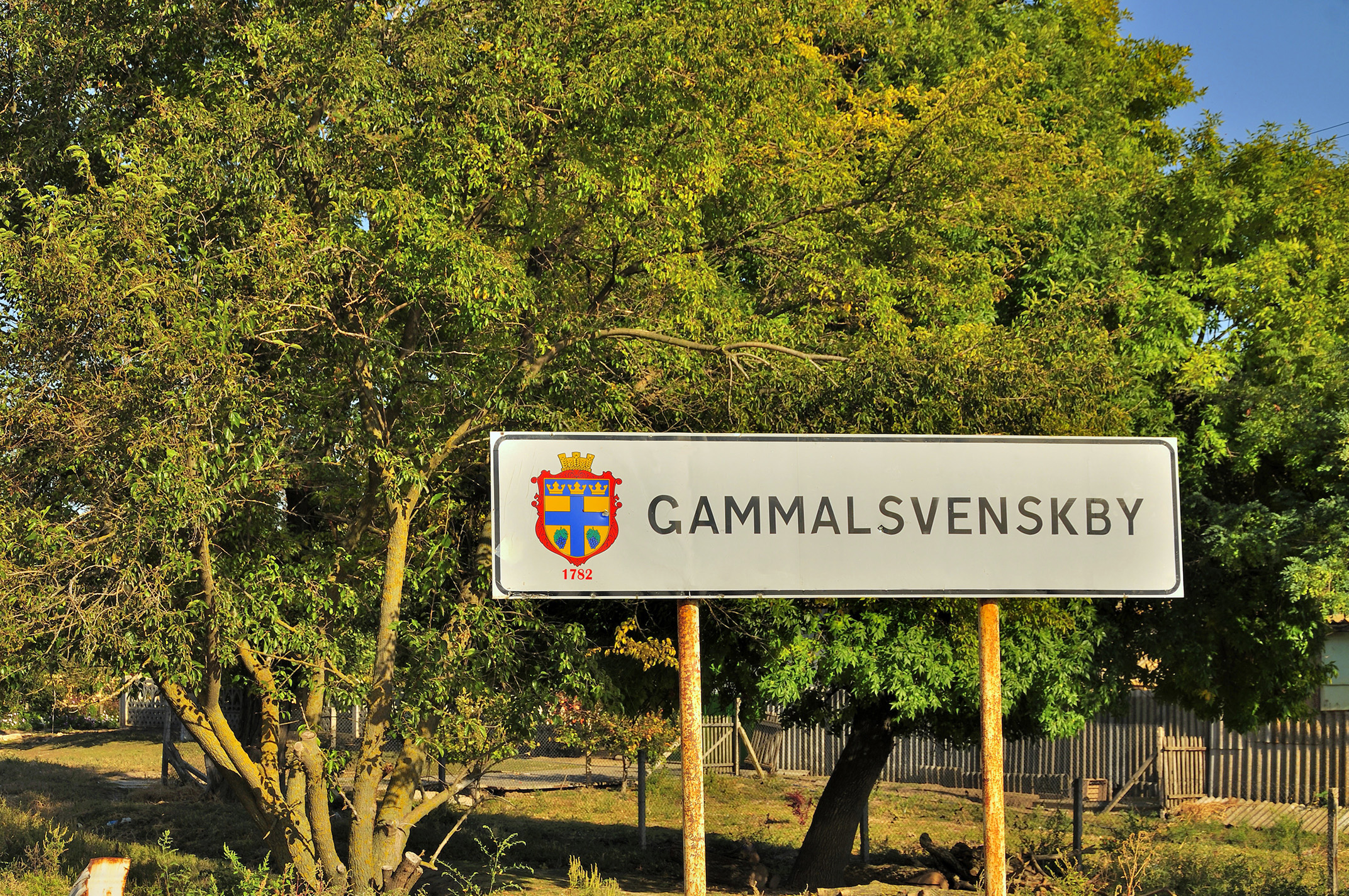
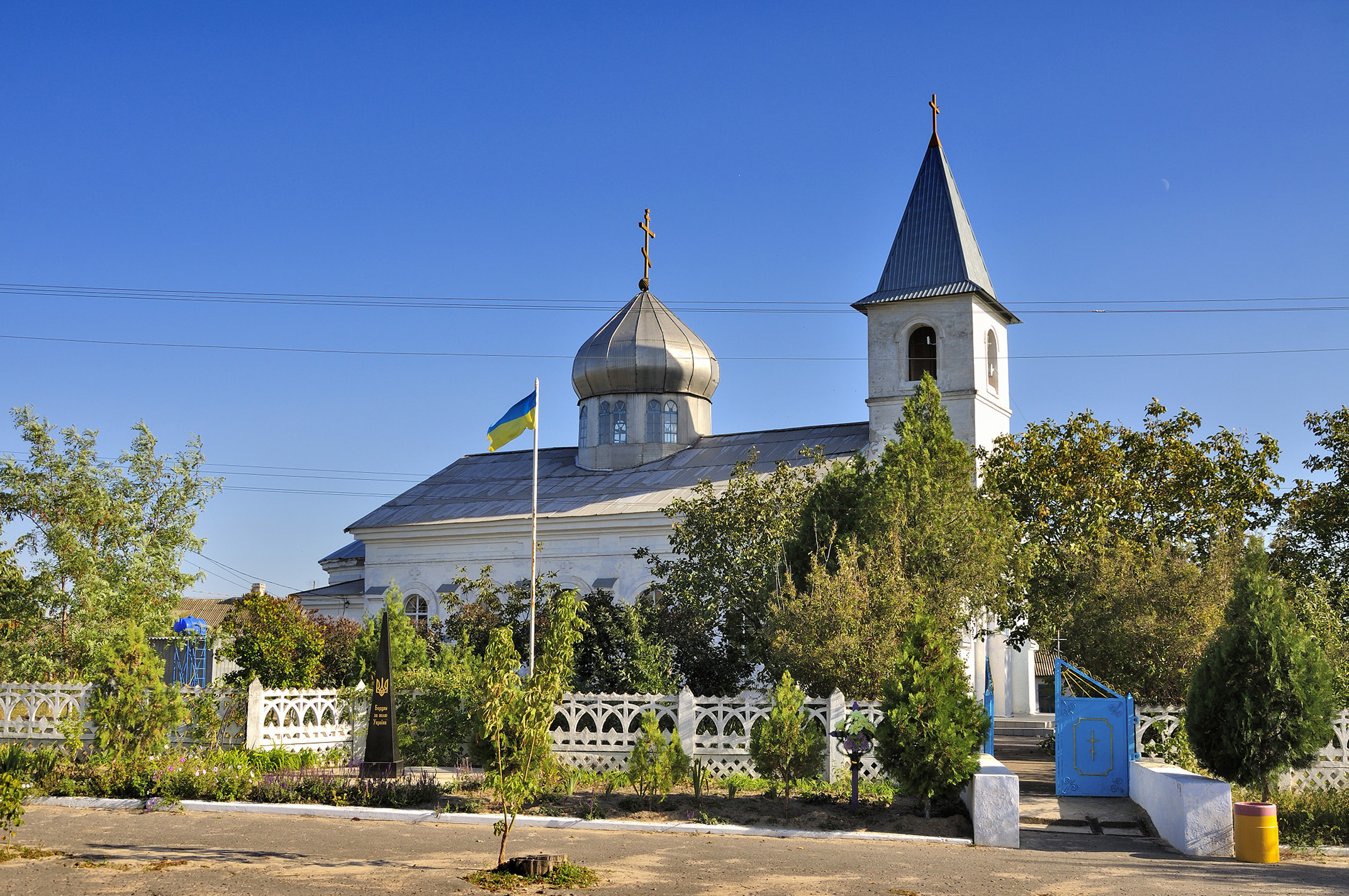
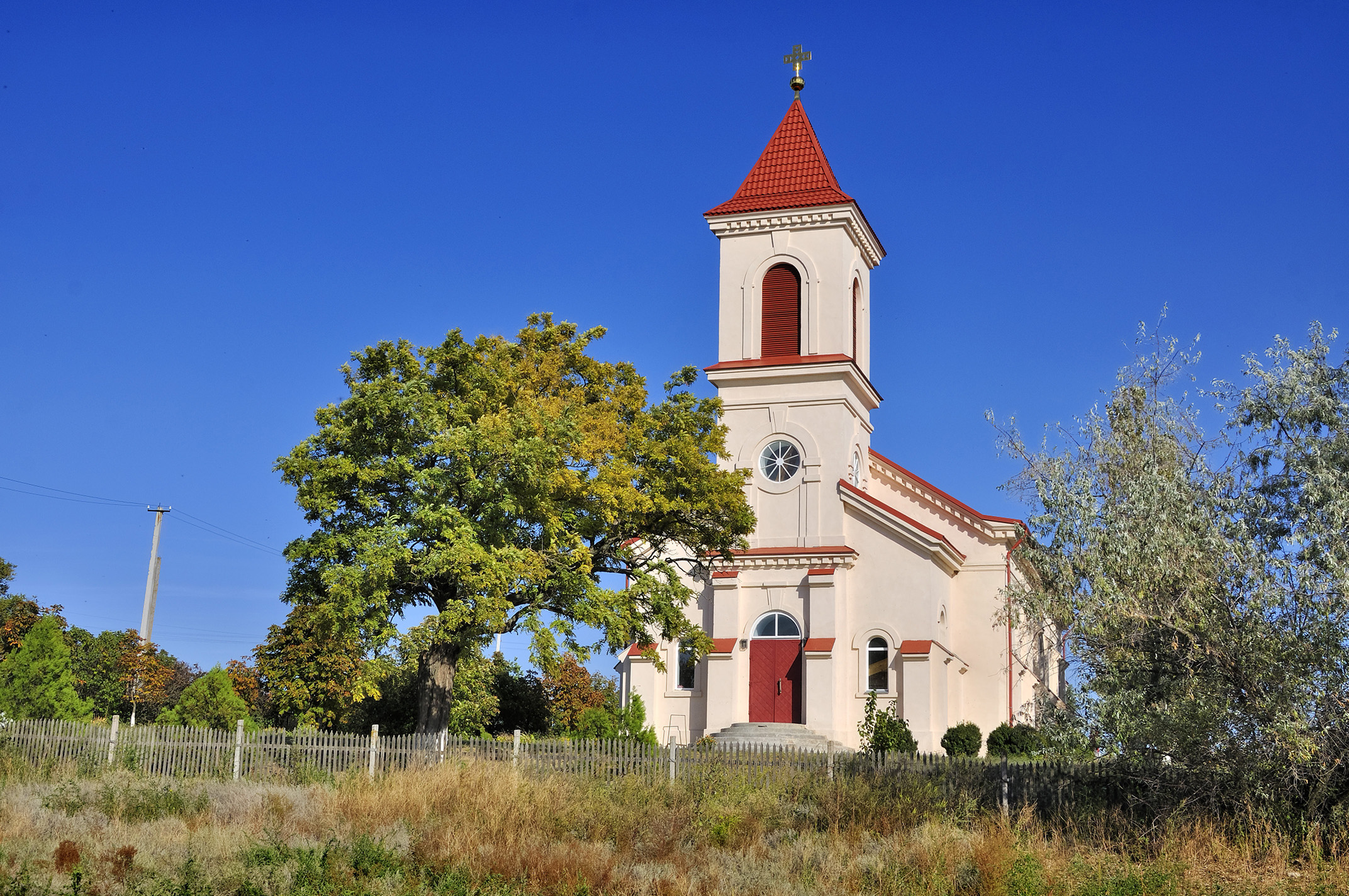
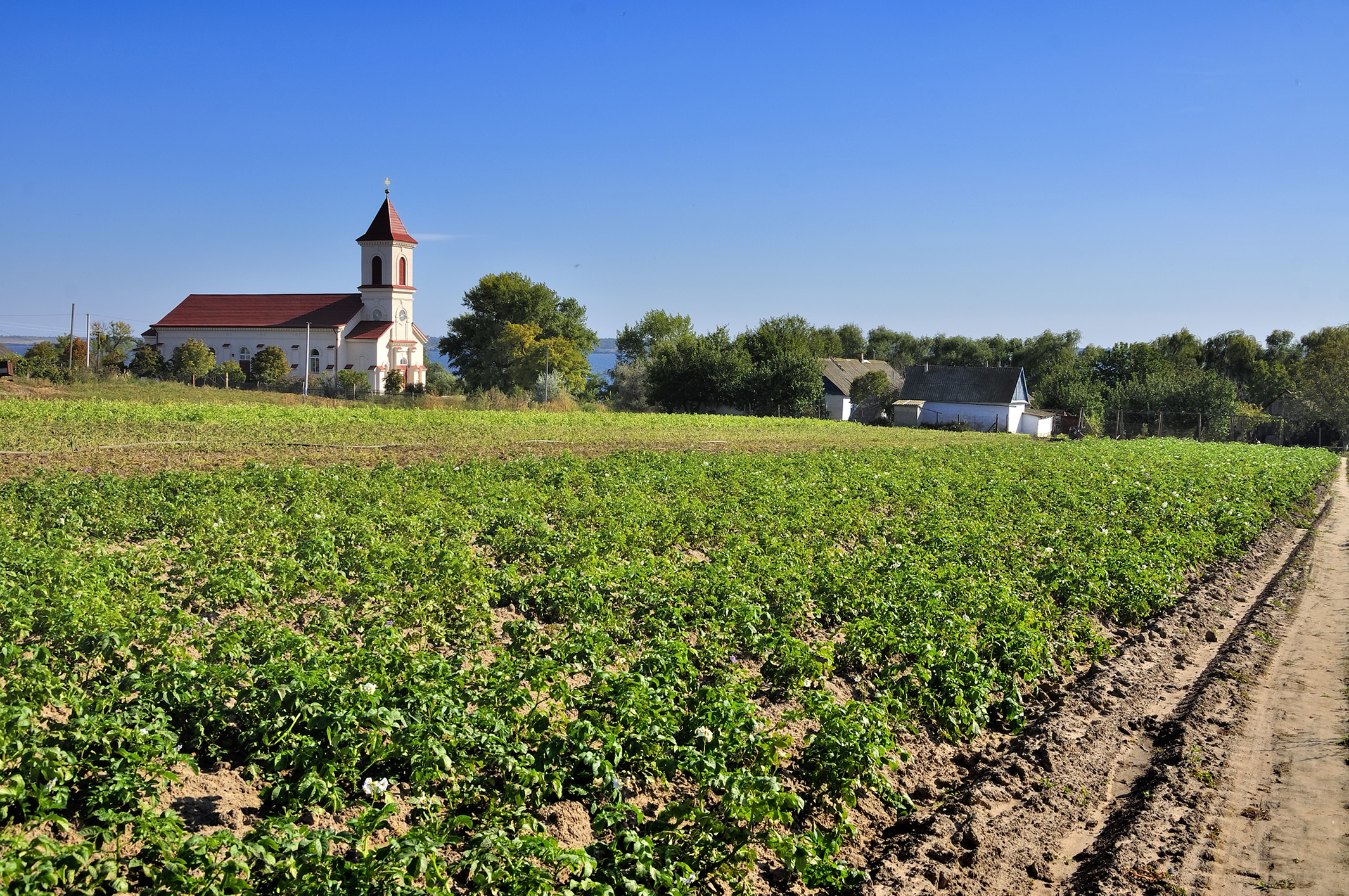

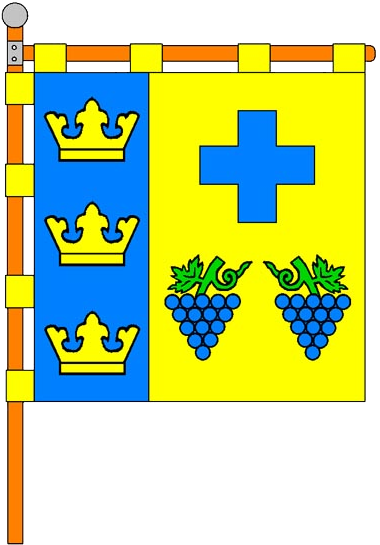
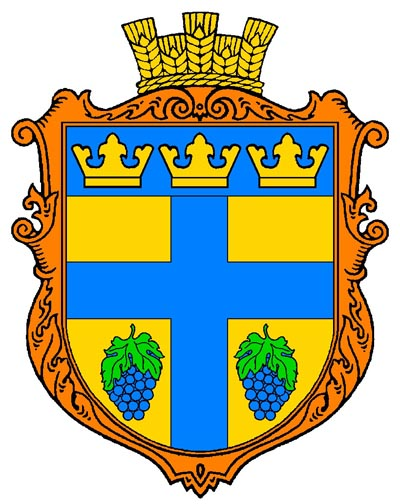
- Flag Coat of arms
- Interactive map of Zmiivka
- Location within Ukraine
- Country: Ukraine
- Oblast: Kherson Oblast
- Raion: Beryslav Raion
- Hromada: Beryslav urban hromada
- Gammalsvenskby established: 1782
- Schlangendorf established: 1804
- Population: 2,759

Zmiivka (Ukrainian: Зміївка, pronounced [z⁽ʲ⁾miˈjiu̯kɐ]) is a village in Beryslav Raion, within Kherson Oblast, Ukraine. It belongs to Beryslav urban hromada, one of the hromadas of Ukraine.

Zmiivka is known for its Old Swede community of Gammalsvenskby which was established there in the 18th century after they were deported from Dagö Island following the Russian annexation of Estonia.

== History ==
=== Russian Empire ===
The settlement Gammalsvenskby was established in 1782 by Swedes from the Dagö Island. In the beginning of 19th century, three German villages were established in the area - Schlangendorf, Mühlhausendorf and Klosterdorf. As of 1886, there were 515 people in Gammalsvenskby, 773 people in Klosterdorf, 489 people in Mühlhausendorf, and 474 people in Schlangendorf.

=== Soviet period ===
The village was affected by the Holodomor in 1932–1933. According to the martyrology "National Book of Memory of the Victims of the Holodomor of 1932-1933 in Ukraine," one person died - Utas Oleksandr. The citizens were repressed by the Soviet authorities for spreading rumors about the famine.

After World War II, Gammalsvenskby was renamed to Verbivka, Schlangendorf - to Zmiivka, Mühlhausendorf - to Mykhailivka, and Klosterdorf - to Kostyrka. The Germans were deported by the Soviet authorities after the war. In 1951, the church was repurposed as a club, and later as a fertilizer warehouse.

In 1951, as the result of the Polish–Soviet territorial exchange, 2,5 thousands Boykos were resettled to the villages from Lodyna (147 families), Dolishni Berehy (170 families), and Nanove (122 families). The villages Mykhailivka, Kostyrka, and Verbivka were incorporated into Zmiivka.

=== Independent Ukraine ===
There are three churches in the village: an Orthodox church, a Lutheran church, and a Greek Catholic church.

On October 2, 2008, Carl XVI Gustaf, the King of Sweden, and his wife Queen Silvia visited Zmiivka. On August 23, 2010, the Day of the National Flag, a memorial dedicated to Heroes of Ukraine was opened.

=== 2022 Russian Invasion ===
The village was under occupation during the Russian invasion of Ukraine. On April 30, 2022, the village headman was abducted by the Russian army. On July 30, the Heroes of Ukraine monument was destroyed. On November 11, Zmiivka was liberated during the Kherson counteroffensive. On April 13, 2023, Russian troops carried out an airstrike on the secondary school, resulting in one death. In October 2023, the house of culture of the village was destroyed by an airstrike.

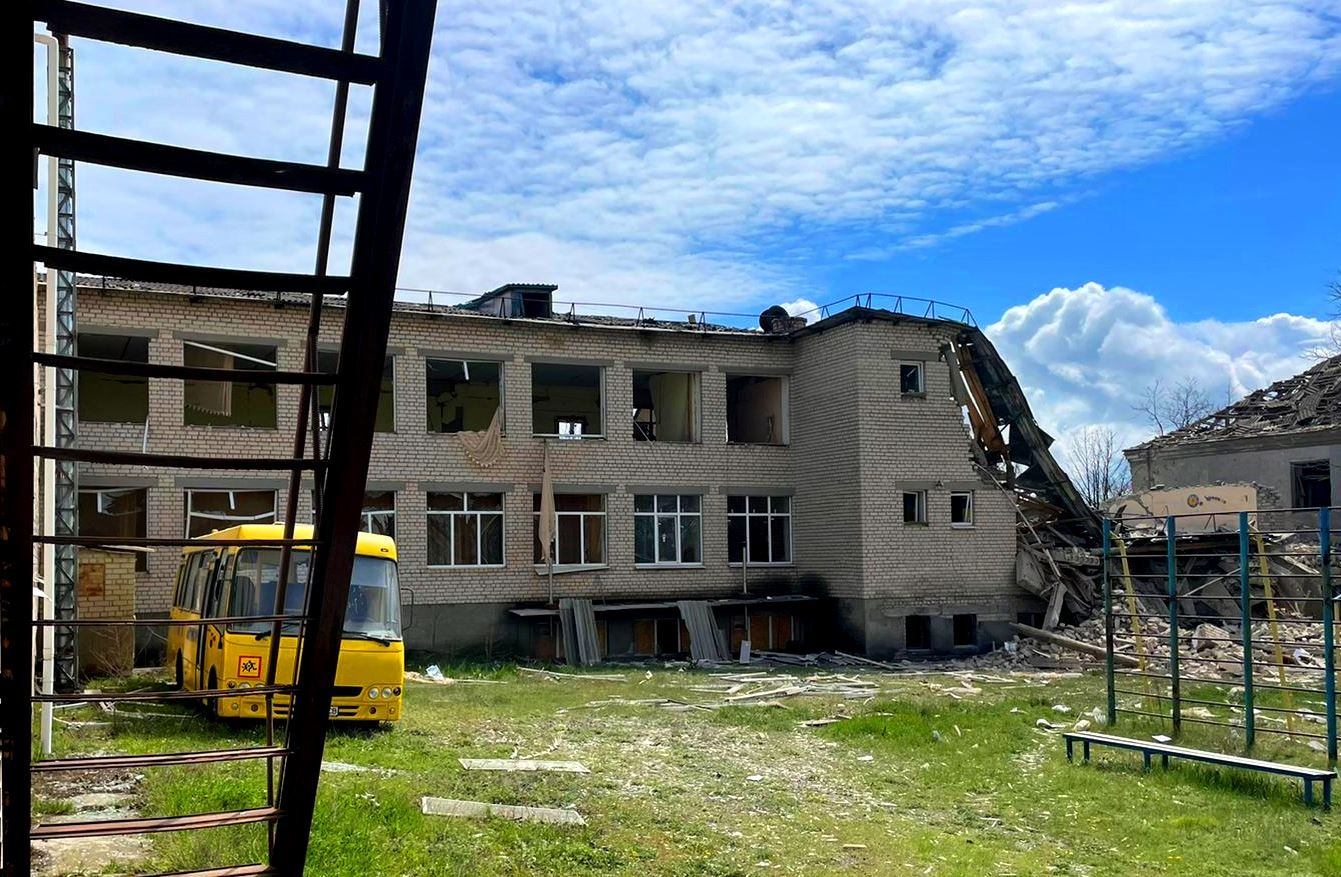
Secondary school after the airstrike

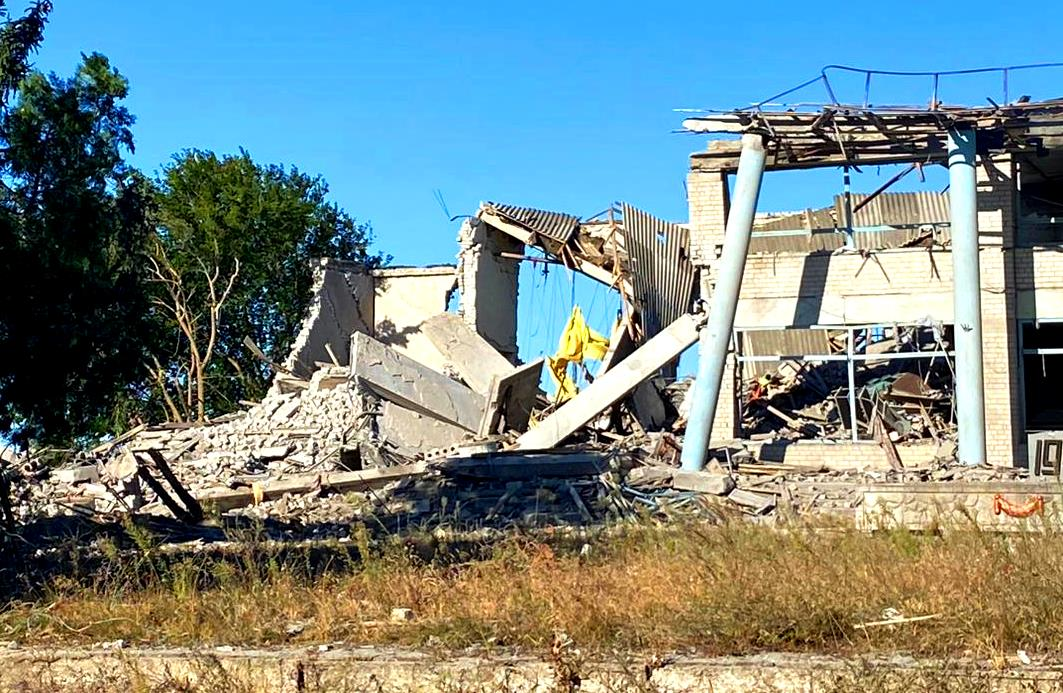
House of culture after the airstrike

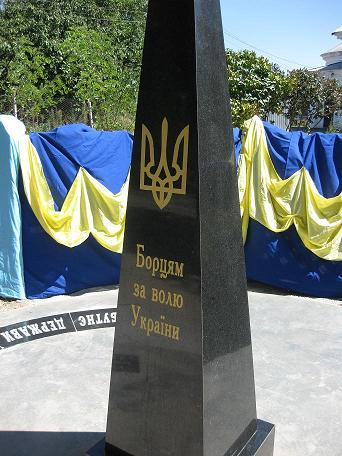
Monument to Heroes of Ukraine prior to its destruction

== Demographics ==
As of 2001, there were 2,739 people in Zmiivka.

=== Language ===
Distribution of the population by native language according to the 2001 census:

Language	Percent of population
Ukrainian	93.04%
Russian	5.26%
Romanian (presented as "Moldovan" in the census)	0.40%
German	0.22%
Belarusian	0.11%
Bulgarian	0.04%

=== Culture ===
There is a music band "Boikivchany" and a Swedish trio choir "Trykusen."

== See also ==
- Dudchany
- Estonian Swedes
- Gammalsvenskby
