= Tsebrykove settlement hromada =

Coordinates: 47°08′47″N 30°06′27″E

Tsebrykove settlement hromada Цебриківська селищна громада
- Hromada
- Interactive map of Tsebrykove settlement hromada
- Country: Ukraine
- Oblast: Odesa Oblast
- Raion: Rozdilna Raion
- Admin. center: Tsebrykove

Area
  - Total: 290.78 km^{2} (112.27 sq mi)

Population (2022)
  - Total: 4,857
  - Density: 16.70/km^{2} (43.26/sq mi)
- CATOTTG code: UA51140170000019764
- Settlements: 15
- Rural settlements: 1
- Villages: 14

Tsebrykove settlement hromada (Ukrainian: Цебриківська селищна громада) is a hromada in Rozdilna Raion of Odesa Oblast in southwestern Ukraine. Population: 4,857 (2022 estimate)

The hromada consists of a rural settlement of Tsebrykove and 14 villages:

- Vyshneve
- Halupove (unpopulated since 2010s)
- Irynivka
- Malotsebrykove
- Mardarivka
- Nykomavrivka
- Novopavlivka
- Novoselivka (unpopulated since 2000s)
- Novoromanivka (unpopulated since 2010s)
- Olenivka
- Olhynove
- Pryvilne
- Sakhanske
- Sokorove

== Links ==
- Цебриківська селищна ОТГ // Облікова картка на офіційному вебсайті Верховної Ради України.
- https://gromada.info/gromada/cebrykivska/
- http://decentralization.gov.ua/gromada/1384#
- http://w1.c1.rada.gov.ua/pls/z7503/A036?rdat1=24.07.2018&vf7551=3421
