= Tsebrykove =

Rural locality in Odesa Oblast, Ukraine

Tsebrykove Цебрикове Hoffnungstal Цебриково
- Rural settlement
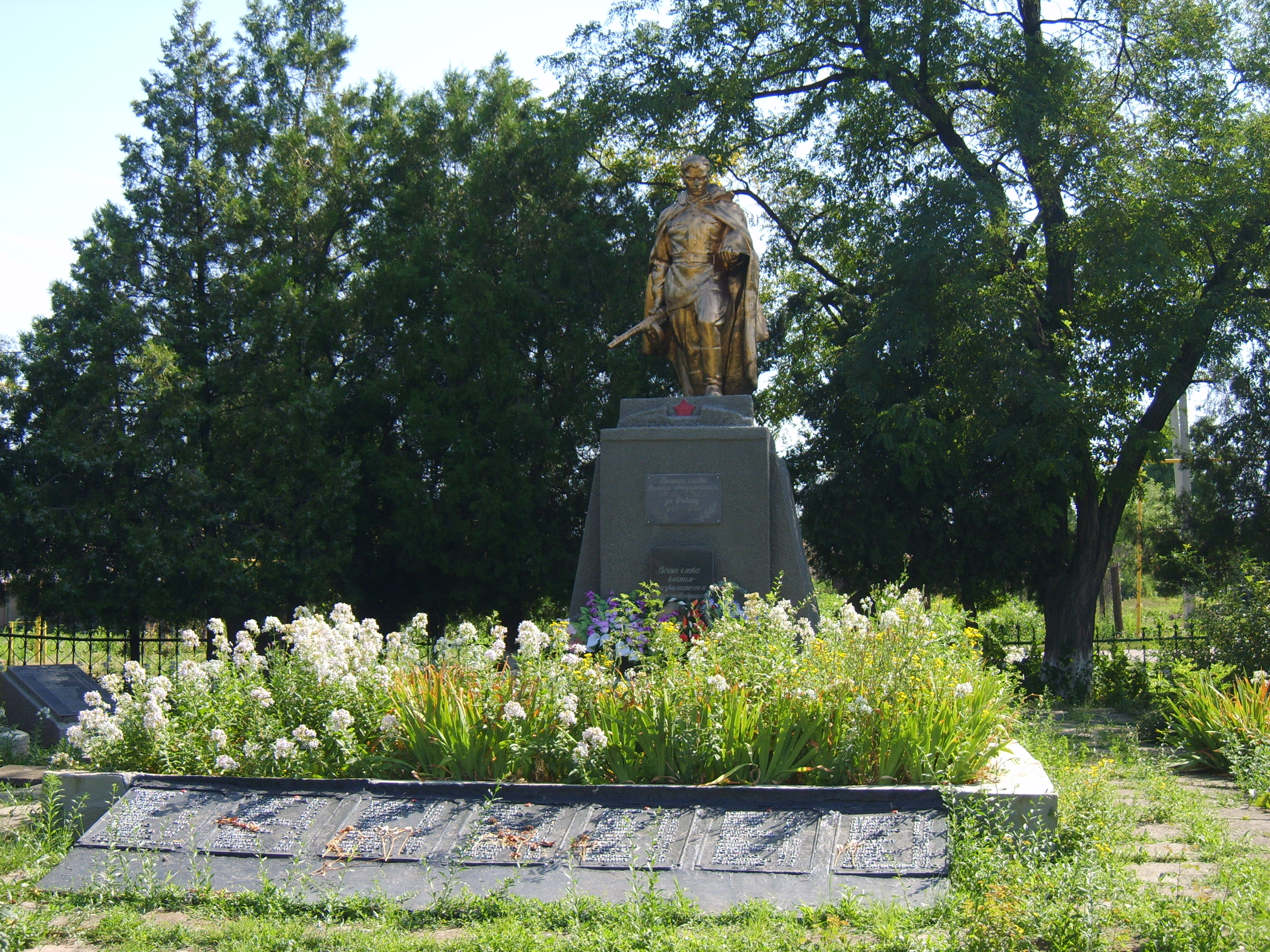
- War memorial in the town

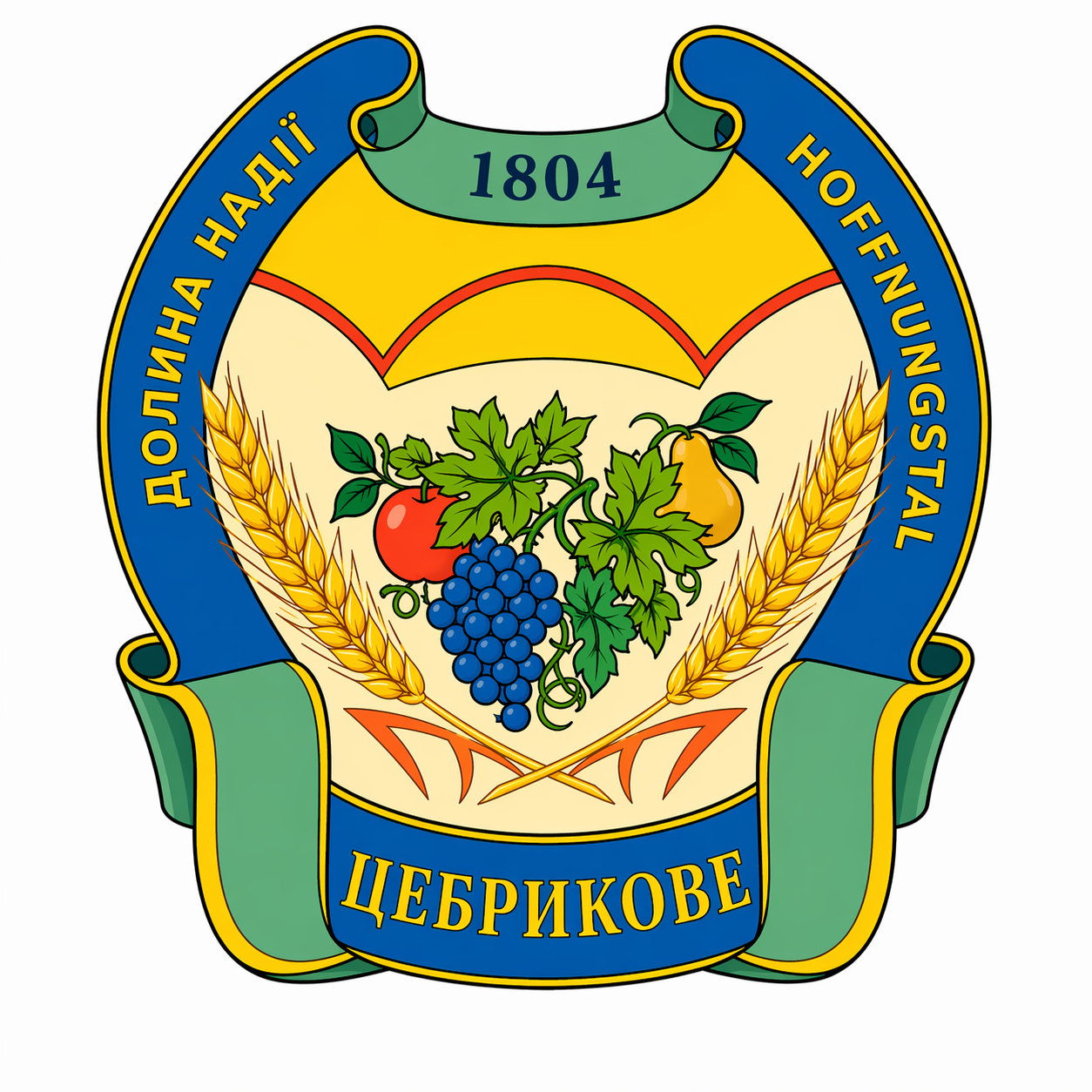
- Coat of arms

- Location within Ukraine Tsebrykove (Ukraine)
- Coordinates: 47°8′47″N 30°6′27″E
- Country: Ukraine
- Oblast: Odesa Oblast
- Raion: Rozdilna Raion
- Hromada: Tsebrykove settlement hromada
- Founded: 1819

Government
  - Mayor: Tetjana Matros

Area
  - Total: 5.87 km^{2} (2.27 sq mi)

Population (2022)
  - Total: 2,709
  - Density: 461/km^{2} (1,200/sq mi)
- Time zone: UTC+2 (CET)
  - Summer (DST): UTC+3 (CEST)
- Postal code: 67131
- Area code: +380 4859
- Vehicle registration: BH

Tsebrykove (Ukrainian: Цебрикове; Russian: Це́бриково, German: Hoffnungstal) is a rural settlement with some 2,900 inhabitants in the Rozdilna Raion, Odesa Oblast in Ukraine. It is located about 80 km (50 mi) east of Tiraspol and about 140 km (87 mi) northwest of Odesa. Tsebrykove hosts the administration of Tsebrykove settlement hromada, one of the hromadas of Ukraine. Population: 2,709 (2022 estimate)

== History ==
Before World War II Tsebrykove was known as Hoffnungstal, Гофнунгсталь, and was populated by Germans. Hoffnungstal was founded in 1819 by Swabian settlers who were granted land. Some of them were Zionists who intended to go on to Palestine and settle there but were refused entry by Turkey. Some of that group settled in Ukraine and some in Georgia. There is an active group of Germans from Russia who study the history of the area. Residents of Hoffnungstal supported the Whites during the Russian Civil war and the town was bombarded by artillery mounted on railway cars. The struggle over collectivization resulted in many deportations and deaths including a number of people shot on the front steps of the Lutheran church in 1937. Nearly all of the remaining Germans left with the retreating German army during World War II. Many German immigrants from Tsebrykove also moved to the United States to a homesteaded about 12 miles northwest of Burlington, Colorado named the "Russian Settlement."

On 7 March 1923 Tsebrykove Raion with the administrative center in Tsebrykove was established. On 30 December 1962 Tsebrykove Raion was abolished and merged into Velyka Mykhailivka Raion.

As of 2001, the largest ethnic groups of Tsebrykove are Ukrainians, Romanians and Russians.

Until 18 July 2020, Tsebrykove belonged to Velyka Mykhailivka Raion. The raion was abolished in July 2020 as part of the administrative reform of Ukraine, which reduced the number of raions of Odesa Oblast to seven. The area of Velyka Mykhailivka Raion was merged into Rozdilna Raion.

Until 26 January 2024, Tsebrykove was designated urban-type settlement. On this day, a new law entered into force which abolished this status, and Tsebrykove became a rural settlement.

== Notable persons ==
- Georg Leibbrandt (1899–1982), scholar and politician in the Nazi Party, born in Hoffnungsfeld, a "daughter" colony of Hoffnungstal
- Immanuel Winkler (1886–1932), parish priest from 1911 to 1918
- Igor Levitin (1952–), Russian politician

== See also ==
- Black Sea Germans
