= Lesko uprising =

Uprising of peasants in Poland

The Lesko uprising (Polish: Rozruchy leskie or powstanie leskie) was an uprising of Rusyn peasants in the Bieszczady Mountains in June and July 1932 against the local authorities of the Second Polish Republic. The impoverished peasants mistook the government introduction of public works aimed at stemming the Great Crisis as an attempt to reintroduce serfdom.

The first clashes occurred on June 21. For a few weeks, thousands of people became involved across the Bieszczady region (primarily around the town of Lesko), as Polish police and soldiers put down the unrest.

The uprising ended on 9 July after about a dozen people had been killed, many wounded and a few hundred arrested.

== Causes ==
The uprising was directly connected with the idea of a local magnate, Count Jan Potocki of Rymanow, who suggested that local residents should take part in a public works project. In the area of Rymanow, the idea was widely accepted, as local Lemkos respected Potocki, and joined the project, whose purpose was to improve infrastructure such as roads, bridges and schools. The situation was different in the Bieszczady Mountains, where the Starosta of Lesko tried to introduce Potocki's idea. On June 19, 1932, a meeting of Potocki and local officials took place at Ustrzyki Dolne, during which an Organizational Committee was created.

The next meeting took place on June 21, at Brzegi Dolne. Among its participants was the engineer Stefan Zieba, who urged peasants to join the public works. In response, Mykola Werebenec, the son of a local Ukrainian Greek Catholic Church parish priest, claimed that Potocki's idea was in fact an attempt to reintroduce serfdom. The meeting turned into a heated argument and then into a riot in which peasants, armed with sticks and pickaxes, surrounded the officials. Altogether, 39 people were arrested, including 4 women. Some other sources claim that the peasants were egged on by members of Communist Party of Western Ukraine, who spread a rumor that serfdom would return.

The arrest of 39 peasants echoed in the area, and residents of local villages, such as Telesnica Oszwarowa, Lobozew Dolny, Lobozew Gorny, Bobrka, soon joined the rebellion. Their struggle was supported by parish priests.

== Uprising ==
Organizers of the uprising included Piotr Madej, Stanislaw Lenkiewicz, Wladyslaw Nowicki, Mikolaj Malecki, Stanislaw Drozd, Antoni Paclawski and Iwan Bucio. The peasants were armed with axes, pickaxes, rakes and scythes. They were faced by reinforced police units, as well as soldiers of the Polish Army garrison in Przemyśl. The first clash took place at Brzegi Dolne on June 23 after which several arrests took place.

In the following days, clashes took place at several other villages. At Lobozew, some 2,000 peasants fought the police and the soldiers, with five casualties. Urged by the police to disperse, the peasants stated that they would go home only if police units were withdrawn from Lobozow. As the situation did not improve, the starosta of Lesko informed the Voivode of Lwow Voivodeship to ask him for help. As a result, Polish Army sent the 2nd Regiment of Podhale Rifles from Sanok, mounted and foot police units from Przemysl, Sambor, Sanok and Mosty Wielkie, as well as a squadron of Polish Airforce.

The uprising spread to villages from the counties of Dobromil, Sanok and Turka. Armed peasants fought four skirmishes with police and soldiers near the villages of Lobozew, Telesnica Oszwarowa and Bobrka. Since the government forces were armed with machine guns, the insurgents withdrew southwards in the sparsely populated hills. They were followed by the army units, which pacified the peasants.

== Aftermath ==
Altogether, up to 800 people were arrested from the 5,000 participants from 19 villages. The exact number of casualties has not been established.

In the historiography of the People's Republic of Poland, the Lesko uprising was regarded as a popular insurrection against oppressive capitalists. A monument commemorating the event was erected in the village of Bóbrka.

== Sources ==
- Mariusz Głuszko, Bieszczady z historią i legendą w tle, Wyd. Armoryka, Sandomierz 2008 r., str. 71–79.
- "Historia Sądu Rejonowego w Lesku". Sąd Rejonowy w Lesku. Archived from the original on 2017-03-04.
- "Twoje Bieszczady". Twoje Bieszczady.
