= Łobozew =

Łobozew may refer to the following places in Poland:

- Łobozew Dolny
- Łobozew Górny
