= State Agricultural Farm =

Collective farming in the People's Republic of Poland

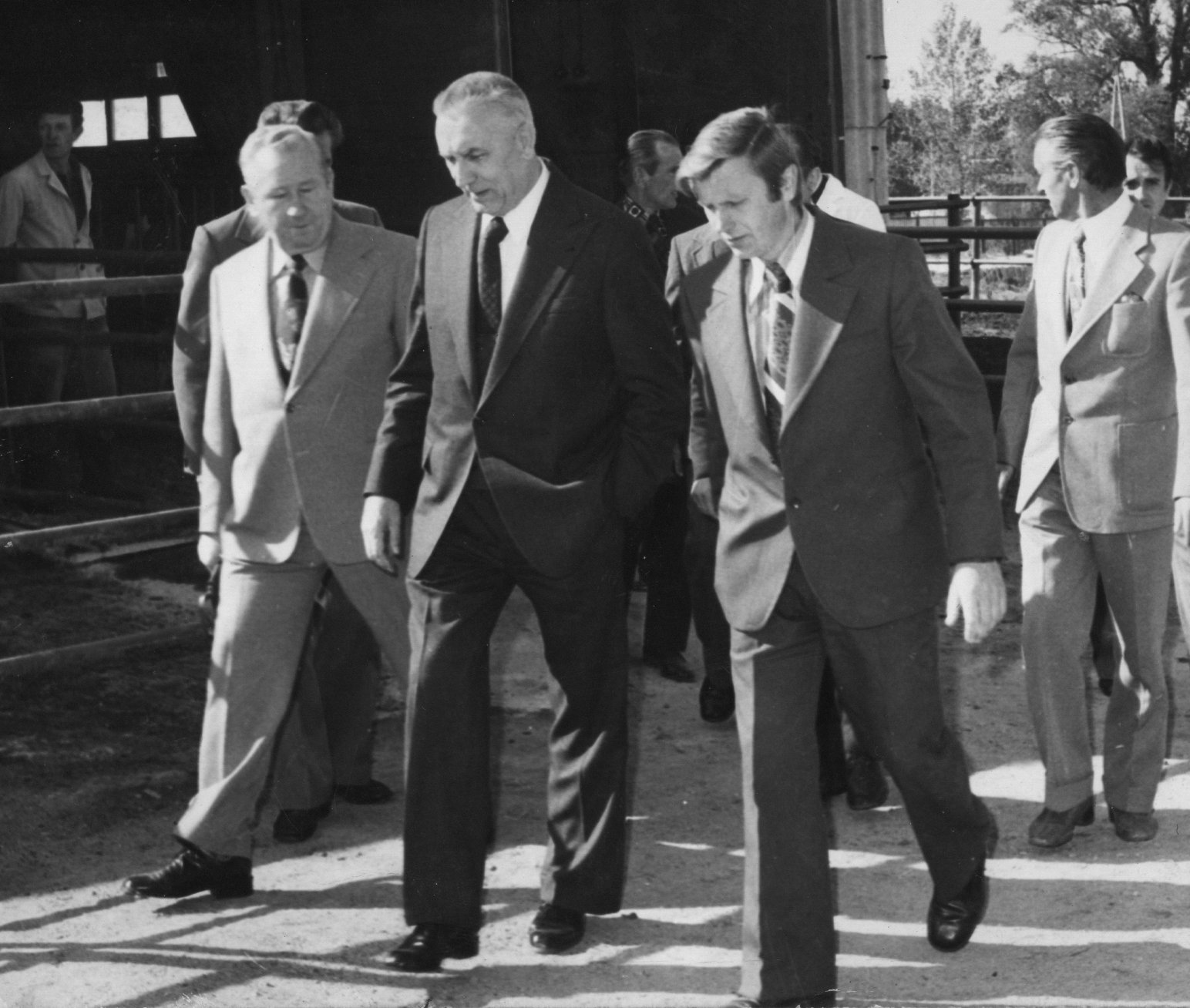
Edward Gierek during a visit to the Rząśnik PGR

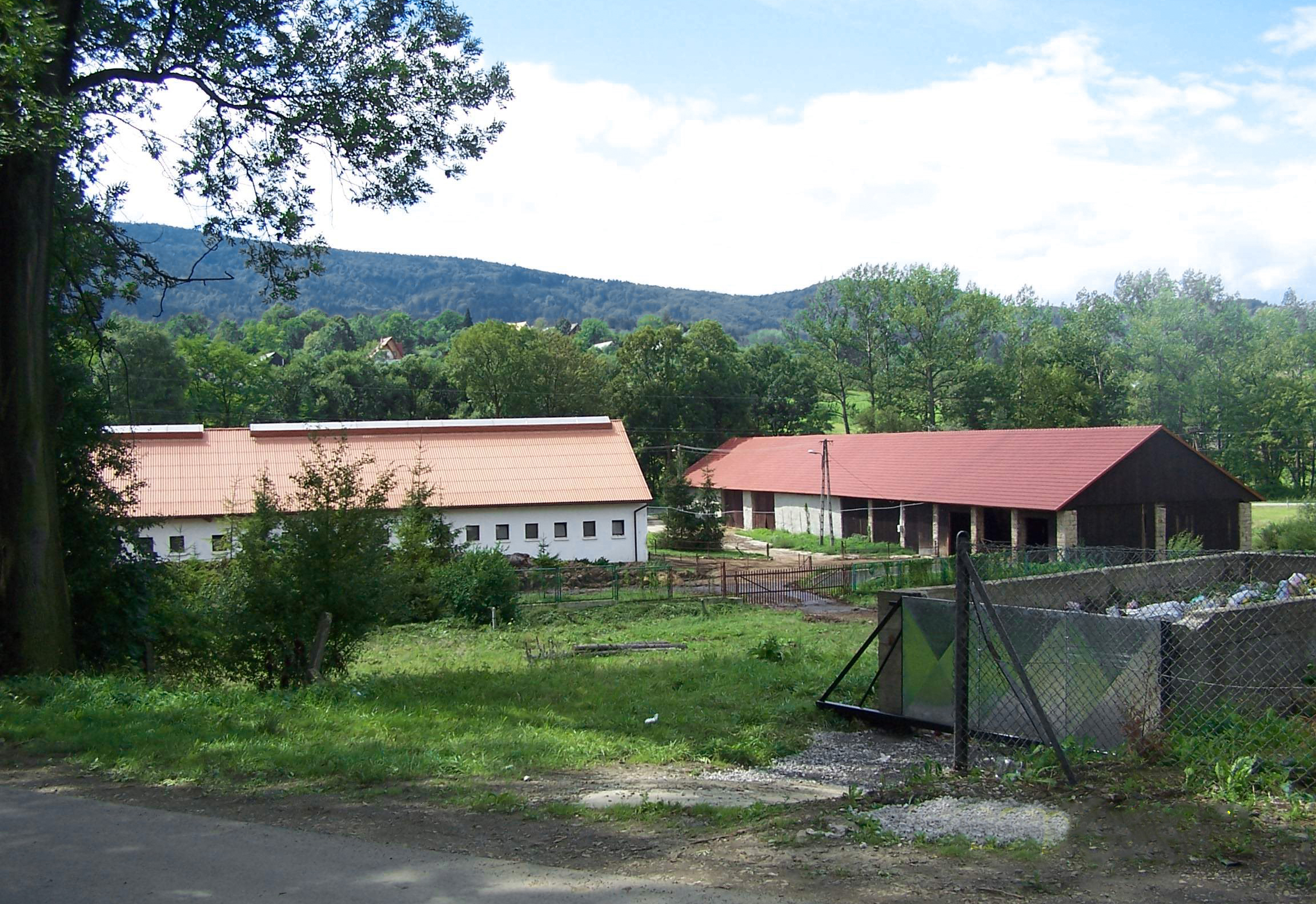
Former PGR in Szczyrzyc

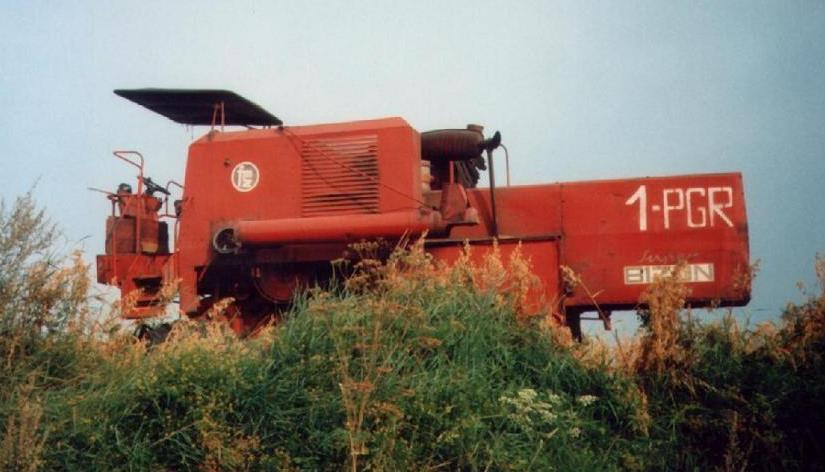
One of the many agricultural machines used in the State Farms - harvester Bison model Z056

A State Agricultural Farm (Polish: Państwowe Gospodarstwo Rolne [paj̃ˈstfɔvɛ gɔspɔˈdarstfɔ ˈrɔlnɛ]; PGR) was a form of collective farming in the Polish People's Republic, similar to Soviet sovkhoz and to the East German Volkseigenes Gut.

They were created in 1949 as a form of socialist ownership of agricultural land by the government. They were primarily formed on the Regained Territories - lands that Poland acquired from Germany after the Second World War - but existed throughout Poland. Some farms took over farms of monasteries, e.g. in Szczyrzyc, see the picture. Relatively inefficient and subsidized by the government, most PGRs went bankrupt quickly after the fall of communism and adoption of a market economy by Poland.

The state ran many specialised farms, which bred and trained horses (especially Arabians, e.g. Bask), bred cows, fish, produced certified seed and potatoes. Some of the farms were state ones before the World War II. Many of the specialised farms still exist, controlled by the Agricultural Property Agency.

Farms were created primarily on the basis of the earlier estates. Many of these households were founded on the Regained Territories.

After moving to the market economy under the Act of October 19, 1991 on agricultural property of the Treasury collective farms were liquidated and their assets were taken over by the Agricultural Property Agency of the Treasury (now Agricultural Property Agency), and their workers - 300 to 450 thousand people - joined the ranks of the unemployed. Households that have not been sold or leased were administered by the Agency of the State Treasury and managed by administrators appointed by the Agency. Then sought to sell or lease property holdings and the accompanying holdings, such as apartments, holiday resorts, etc. The social base has also been a sale of land to individual farmers. The weakest part of the land remained undeveloped for several years. The process of selling and leasing land societies and social services continues.

Liquidation of state-owned farms has often been restricted, or permanent abandonment of animal husbandry, crop production limitation, changes in farming methods. This led to a drastic reduction of jobs and the resulting wide range of local problems; in many regions, PGR were the only employer, the new owners after restructuring usually significantly reduced the employment. State-owned farms were very often the organizers of social life, and theoretically adequately met all the needs of workers. Their downfall has often caused damage to the structure of the local communities, which were not adapted to the new situation of economic activity. It has also devastated the property - partly as a result of theft, partly because of the lack of elementary security.

On 22 July 2008 in Bolegorzyn, near Złocieniec a museum of the State Farms was opened.

== Gallery ==
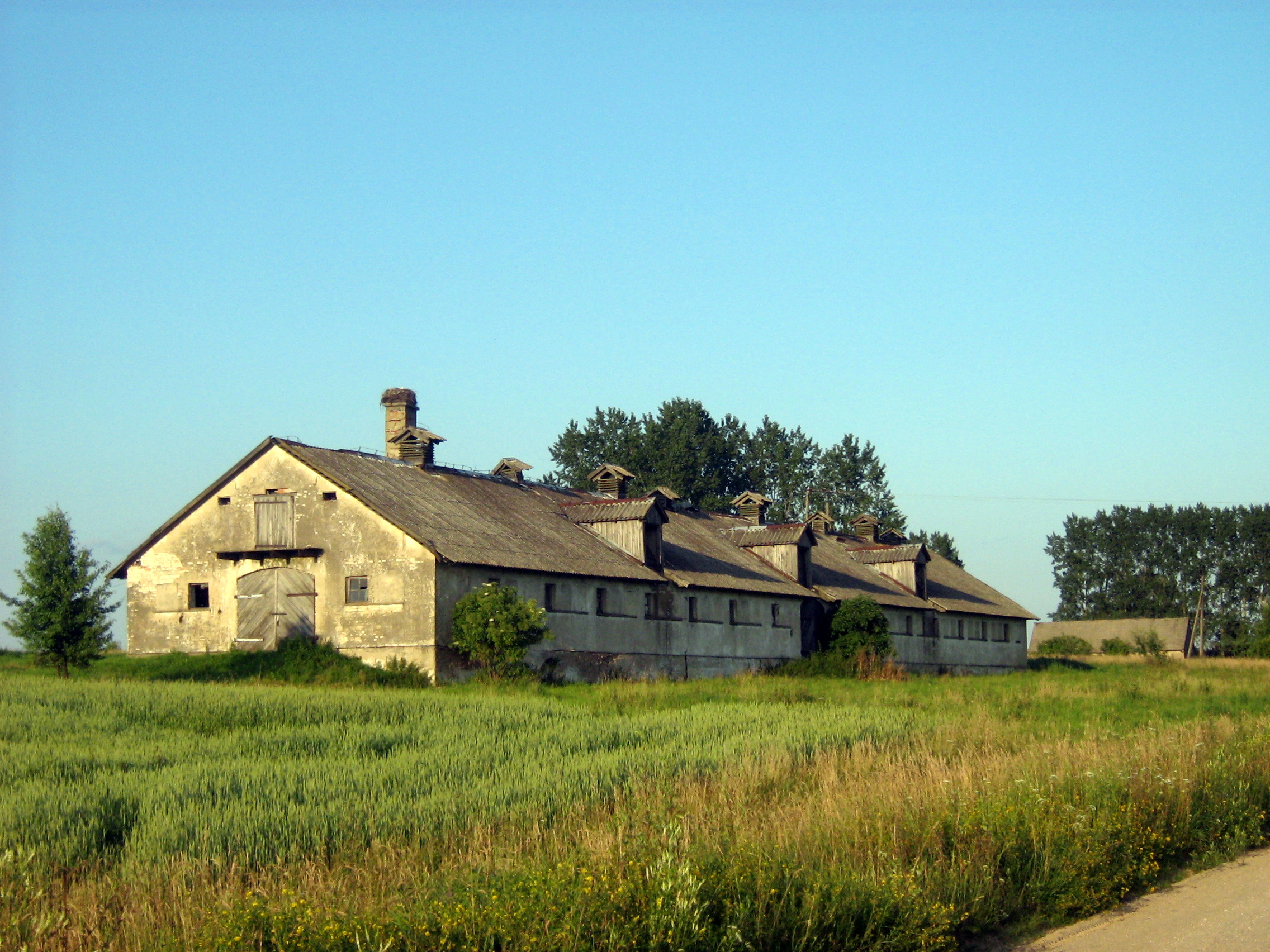
PGR Wieżanka

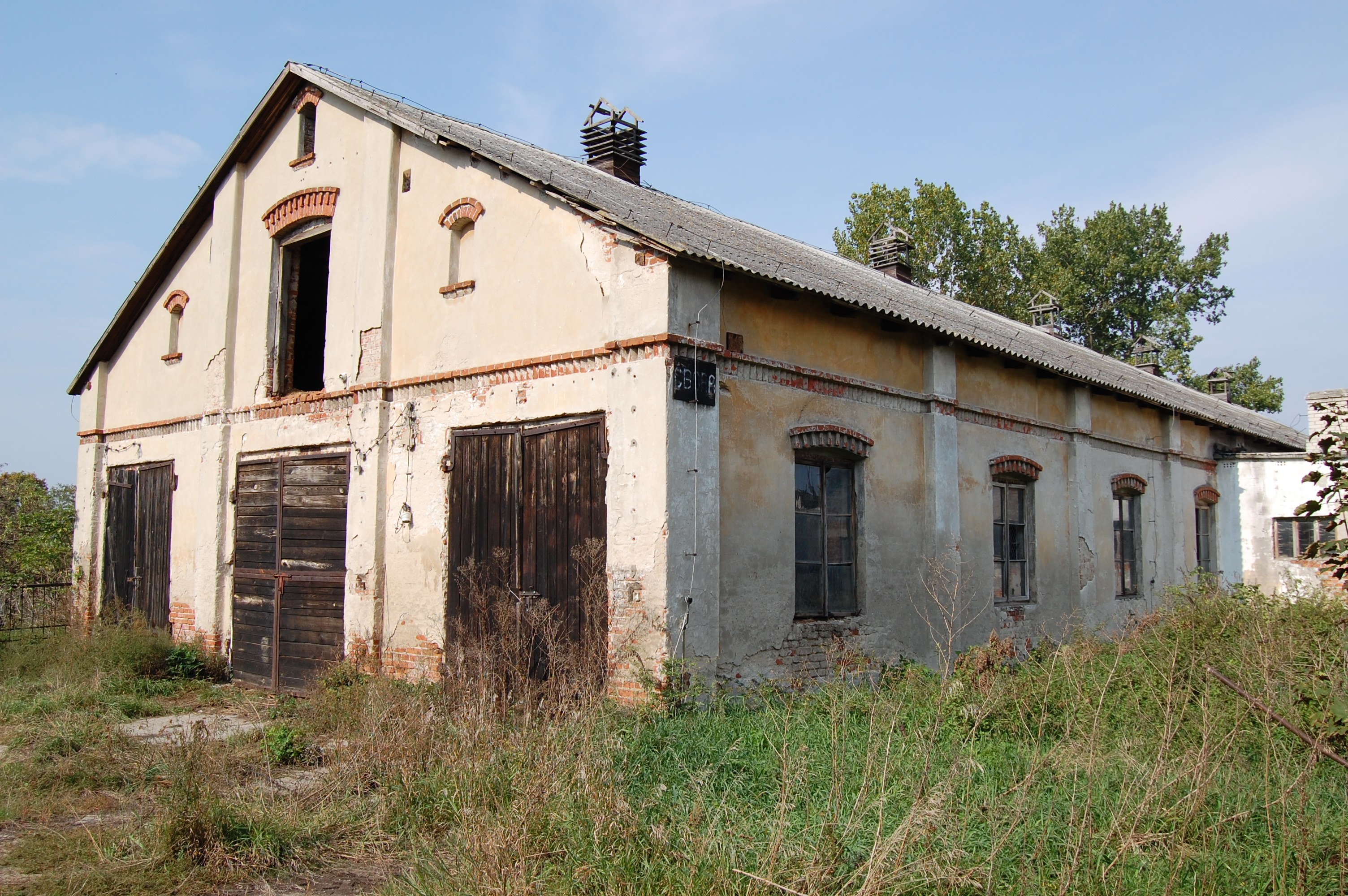
PGR Żelechów

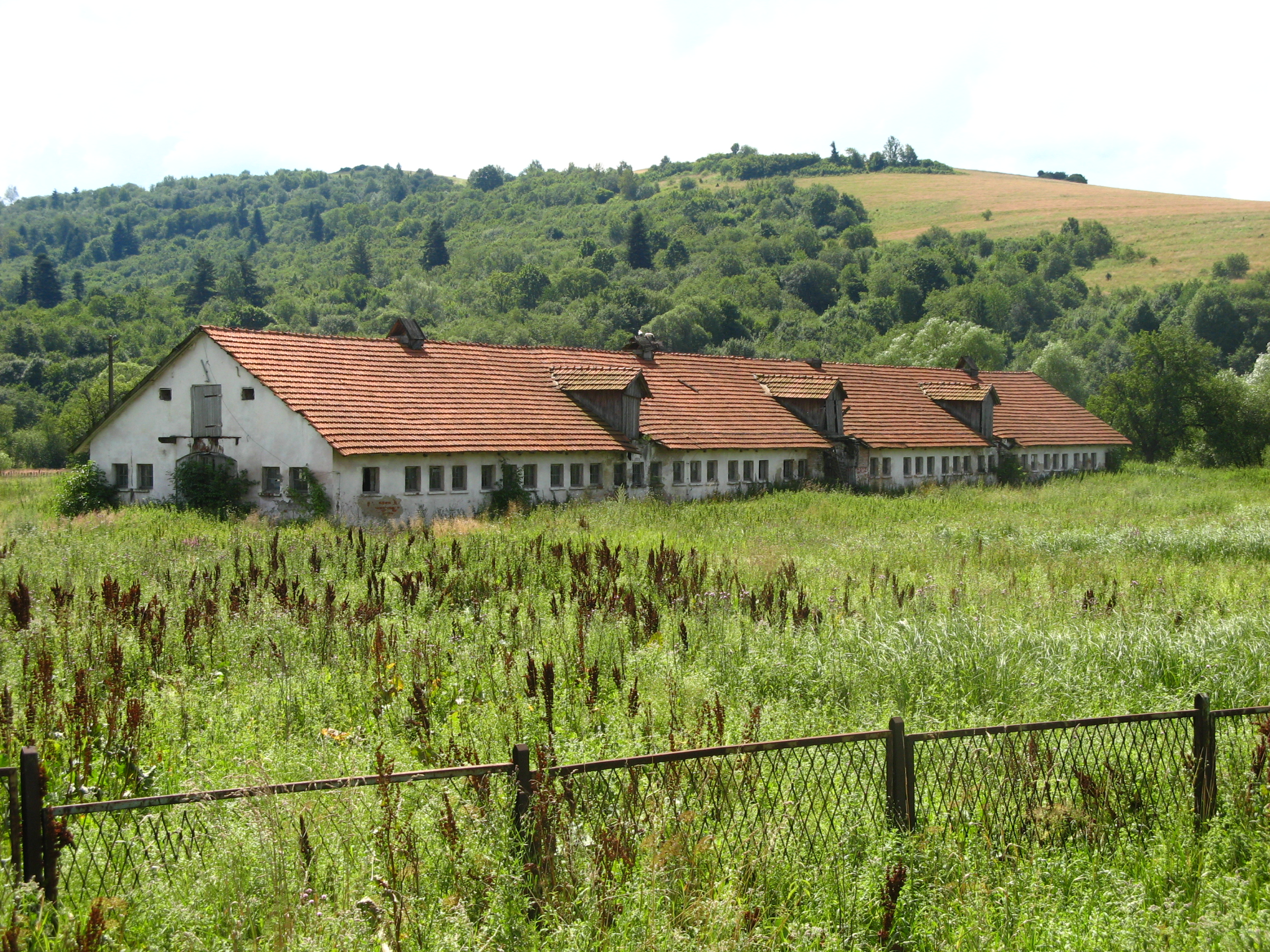
PGR Krościenko

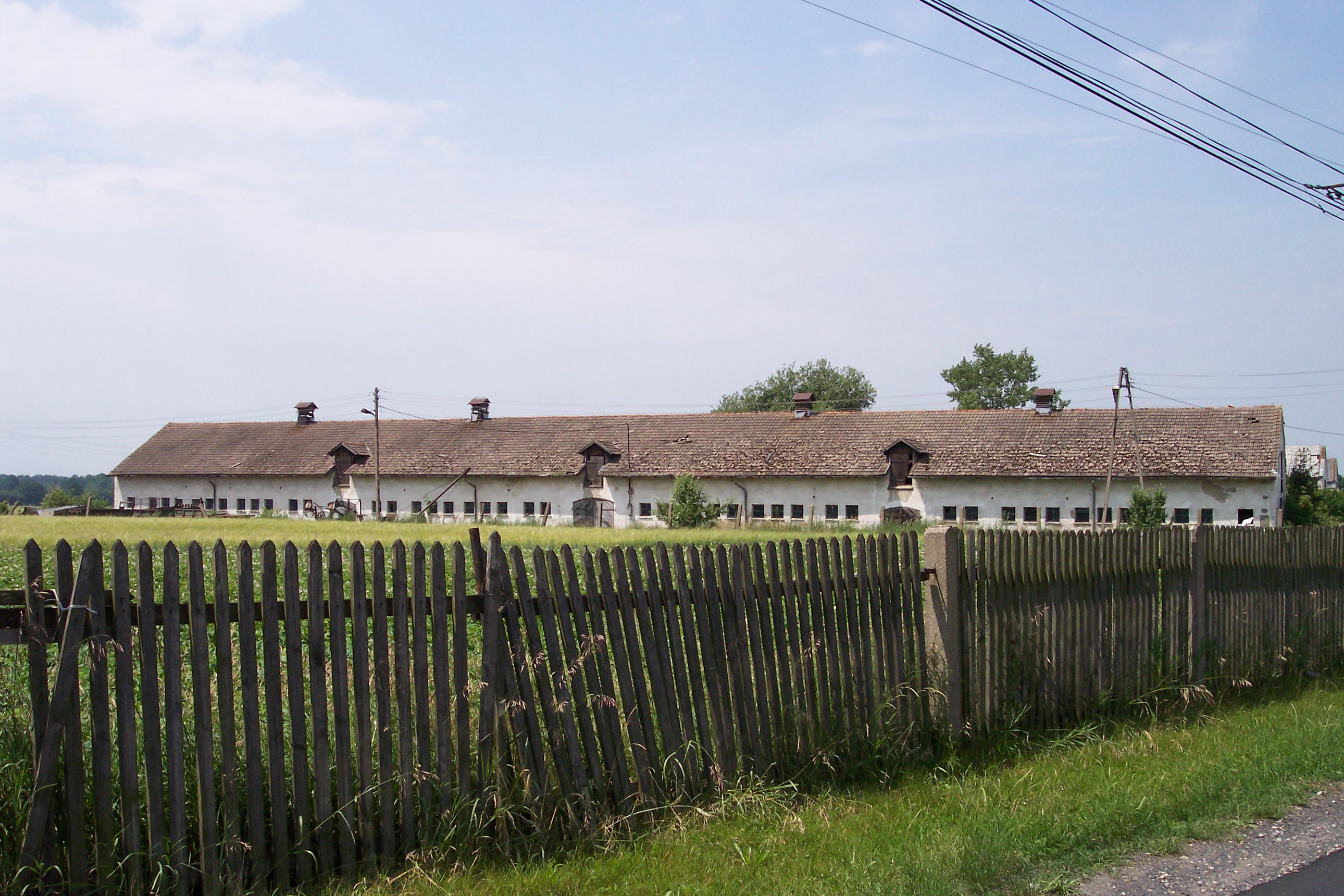
PGR Gwoździany

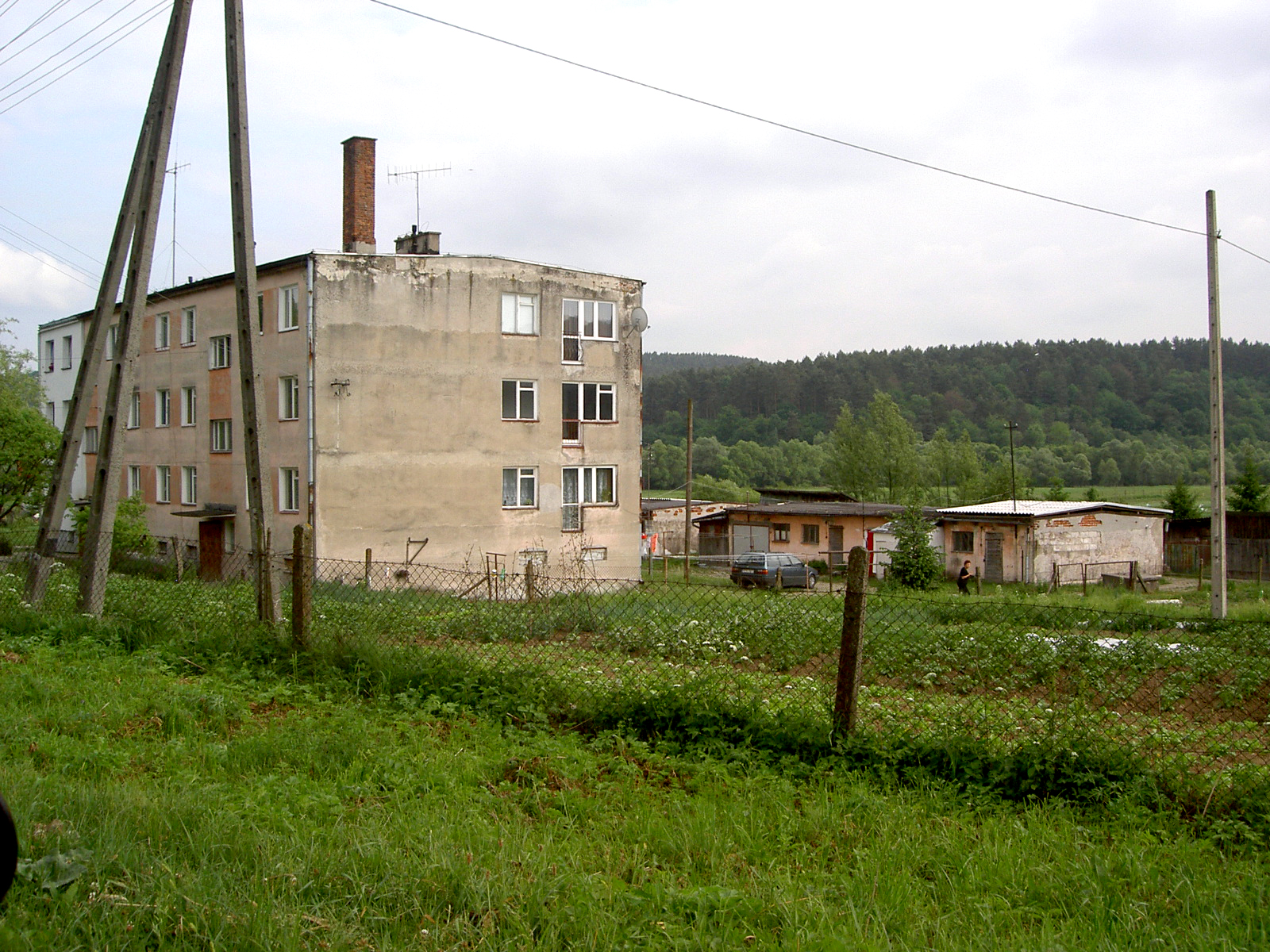
PGR Rybotycze

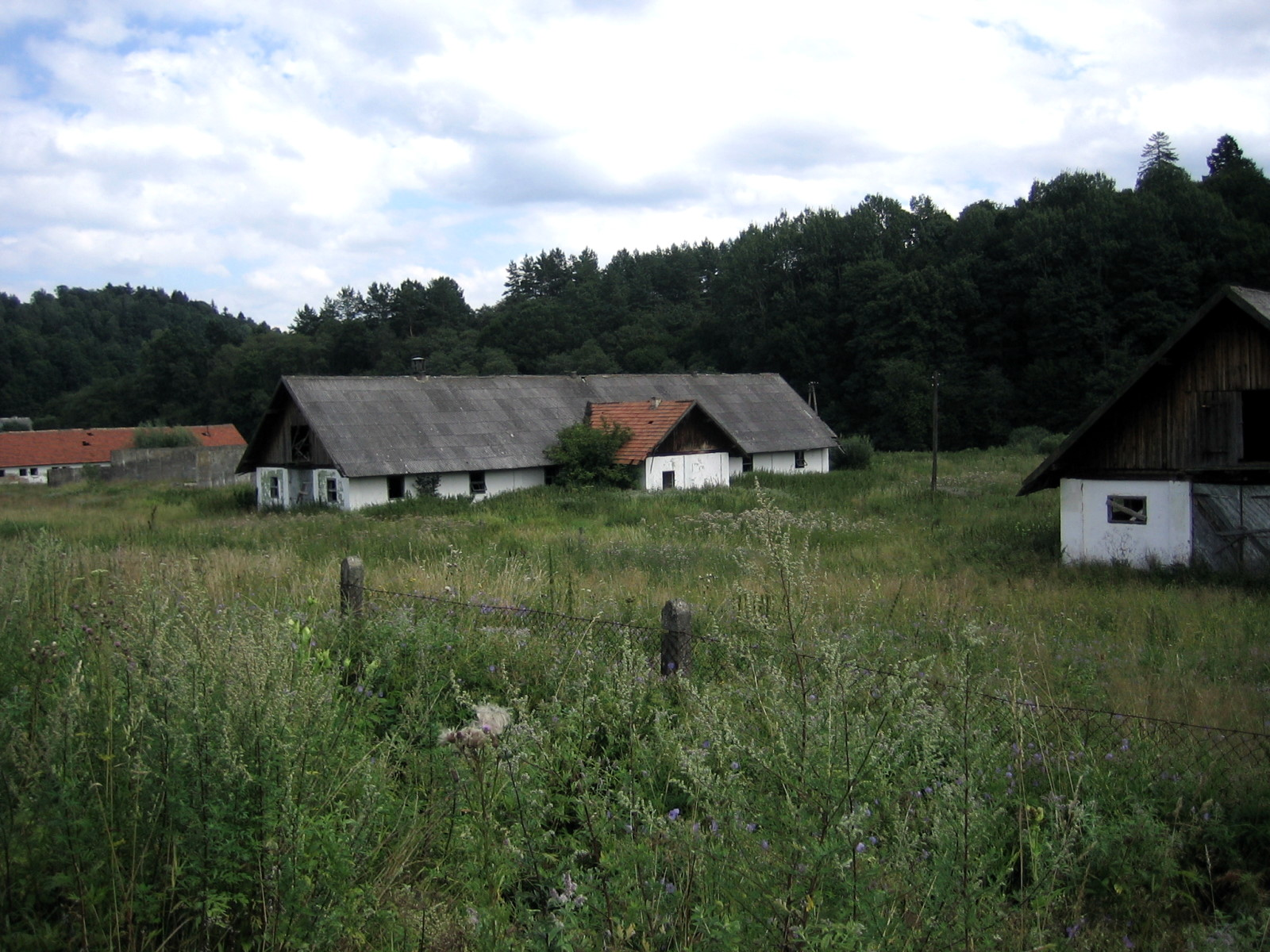
PGR Grąziowa

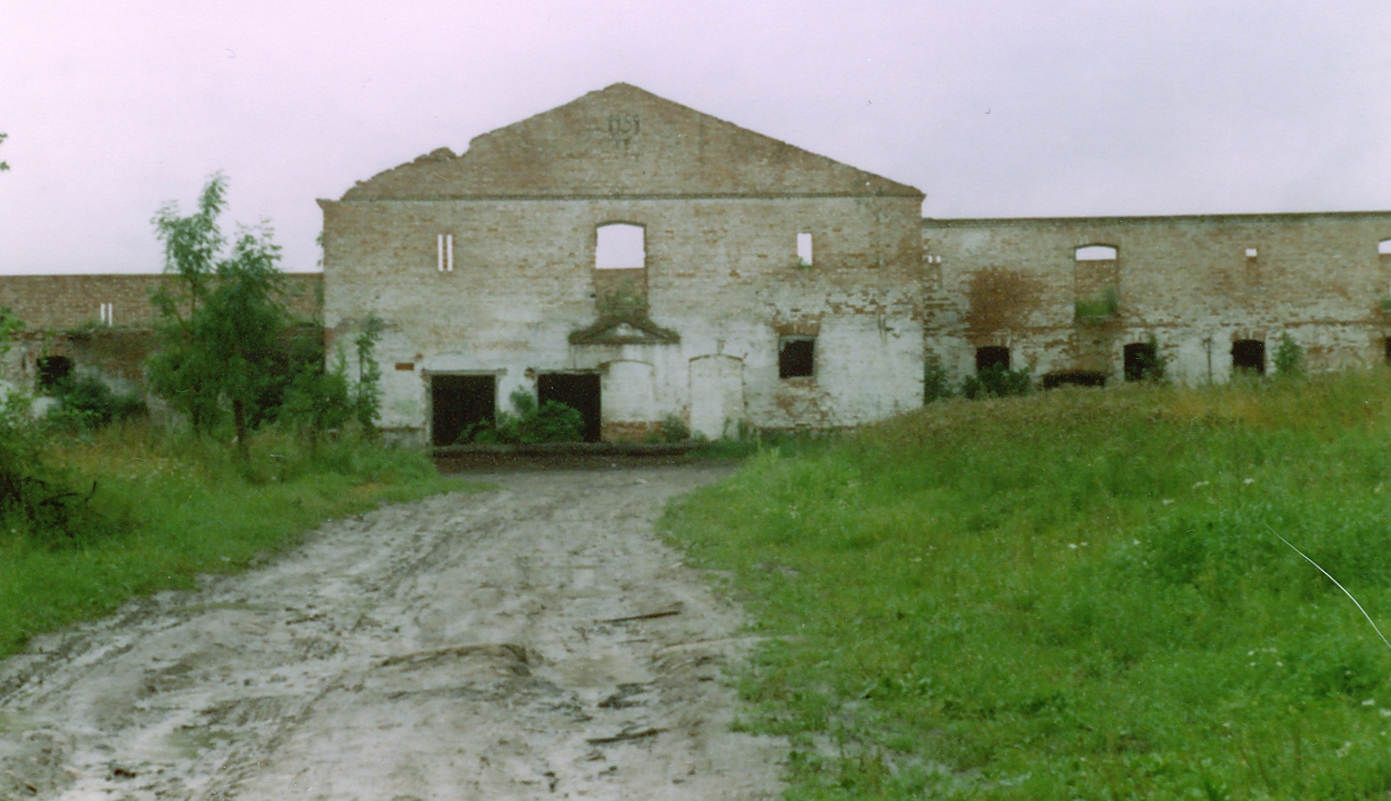
PGR Pieszcz

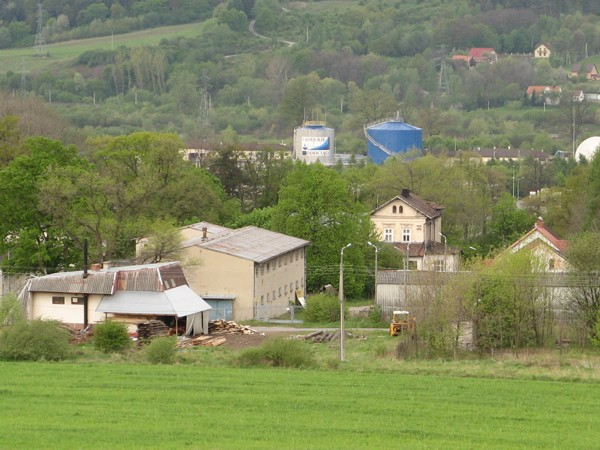
PGR Wielopole

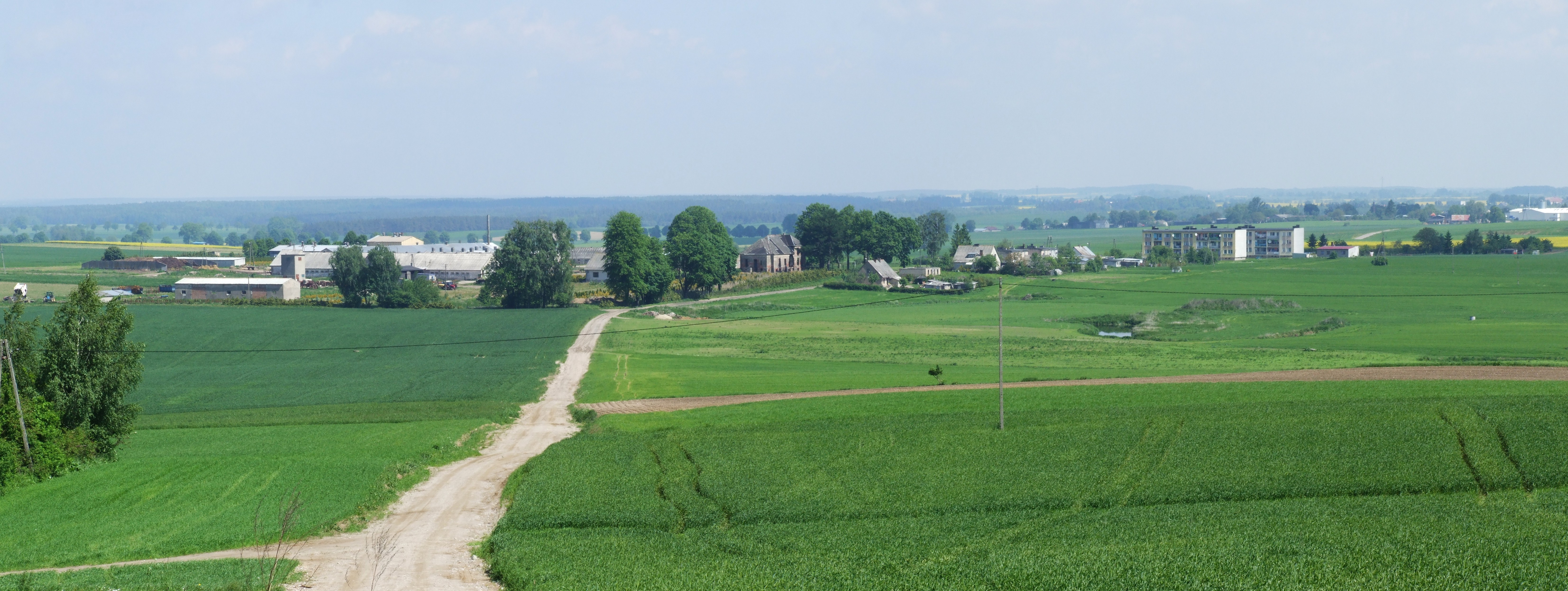
PGR Grabowo

== See also ==
- Collectivization in Poland
- Folwark
- Kolkhoz
- Nationalization in Poland
