= Jamna =

Jamna may refer to:

- Jamna (bird), an extinct passeriform bird from early Oligocene deposits in Poland
- Jamna, Slovenia, a settlement in northeastern Slovenia
- Jamna, Lesser Poland Voivodeship, a village in Lesser Poland Voivodeship, Poland
- Jamna Górna and Jamna Dolna, two non-existing villages in Subcarpathian Voivodeship, Poland
- Yamuna River, also known as Jamna, a major river of northern India
- Jamna, the stream in the city of Mikołów, Silesia, Poland
- Popular Front of Islamic Revolution Forces (JAMNA), political organization in Iran

== See also ==
- Yamna (disambiguation)
- Jamuna (disambiguation)
