= Ustjanowa =

Ustjanowa may refer to the following places in Poland:

- Ustjanowa Dolna
- Ustjanowa Górna
