= Dźwiniacz =

Dźwiniacz may refer to the following places:

- Dźwiniacz Dolny, Poland
- Dźwiniacz Górny, Poland
- Dzvynyach, Ukraine
