= Mochary =

Mochary is a surname. Notable people with the surname include:

- Mary V. Mochary (born 1942), American lawyer and politician
- Matthew Mochary (born 1968), American businessman, investor, and filmmaker

== See also ==
- Moczary, Bieszczady County
