= Zawadka, Bieszczady County =

Zawadka
- Village
- Location within Poland
- Coordinates: 49°33′50″N 22°27′45″E
- Country: Poland
- Voivodeship: Podkarpackie
- County: Bieszczady
- Gmina: Ustrzyki Dolne

Zawadka Ukrainian: Завадка; [zaˈvadka] is a village in Poland, located in the Gmina Ustrzyki Dolne, Bieszczady County, Subcarpathian Voivodeship.

Population — 155 people (2011).

== Location ==
Zavadka is located 20 km northwest of the administrative center of the gmina, Ustrzyki Dolne, and 60 km southeast of the administrative center of the voivodeship, Rzeszów. It lies 15 km from the state border with Ukraine. Former Boyko village.

== History ==
It was first mentioned in a document from 1508 as the property of Mikołaj Czeszyk. It belonged to the Lesko estate of the Sanok Land in the Ruthenian Voivodeship.

In 1772–1804 the village was part of the Habsburg monarchy, in 1804–1867 of the Austrian Empire, and in 1867–1918 of the Austro-Hungarian monarchy, in the province of the Kingdom of Galicia and Lodomeria. In 1895 the village belonged to Lesko County. There were 77 houses and 563 inhabitants (349 Greek Catholics, 159 Roman Catholics, and 24 Jews). The local Greek Catholic parish belonged to the Lesko Deanery of the Eparchy of Przemyśl.

In 1919–1939 it was part of Poland. The village belonged to Lesko County of the Lwów Voivodeship. In 1934–1939 it was part of Gmina Ropienka.

As of 1 January 1939, the village had 1,130 inhabitants: 720 Ukrainian Greek Catholics, 140 Ukrainian Roman Catholics, 230 Poles (oil mine workers), and 40 Jews.

In mid-September 1939 the Germans occupied the village, but on 26 September 1939 they withdrew from the right bank of the San River, since under the Molotov–Ribbentrop Pact the right bank of the San belonged to the Soviet sphere of influence. On 27 November 1939, by decree of the Presidium of the Supreme Soviet of the Ukrainian SSR, the village was included in the newly created Drohobych Oblast. On 17 January 1940 it became part of the newly formed Liskivskyi Raion (district center — Lisko). At the end of June 1941, with the beginning of the German–Soviet War, the territory was again occupied by the Germans, who exterminated the Jewish population during three years of occupation. In August 1944 Soviet troops retook the village.

In March 1945, in preparation for signing the Polish–Soviet border agreement of August 1945, the right bank of the San, including the village, was transferred from Drohobych Oblast to Poland. The Polish Army and Polish armed groups began looting and killing Ukrainians; in response, villagers organized self-defense units. Subsequently, the Ukrainian population was subjected to ethnocide — resettled to the territory of the USSR in 1945–1946 and deported in 1947 during Operation Vistula to the Recovered Territories (former German lands). Poles were settled in the houses of Ukrainians.

In 1975–1998 the village belonged to Krosno Voivodeship.

== Demographics ==
Demographic structure as of 31 March 2011:

	Total	Pre-working age	Working age	Post-working age
Men	81	26	48	7
Women	74	15	44	15
Total	155	41	92	22

== Church ==
In 1838 a wooden church of Venerable Mother Paraskeva was built, which served as a parish church.

Until 1947 there was a Greek Catholic parish in the village, belonging to the Lesko Deanery of the Eparchy of Przemyśl, which in addition to Zavadka included the villages of Stankowa and Rozpucie.

In 1951 the church was destroyed by the Polish authorities.

== Landmarks ==
- Remains of the church: iron cross and stone baptismal font from 1866.
- Chapels.
- Old cemetery.
- Pre-war buildings.
