= 1951 Polish–Soviet territorial exchange =

Largest peaceful territorial exchange in history

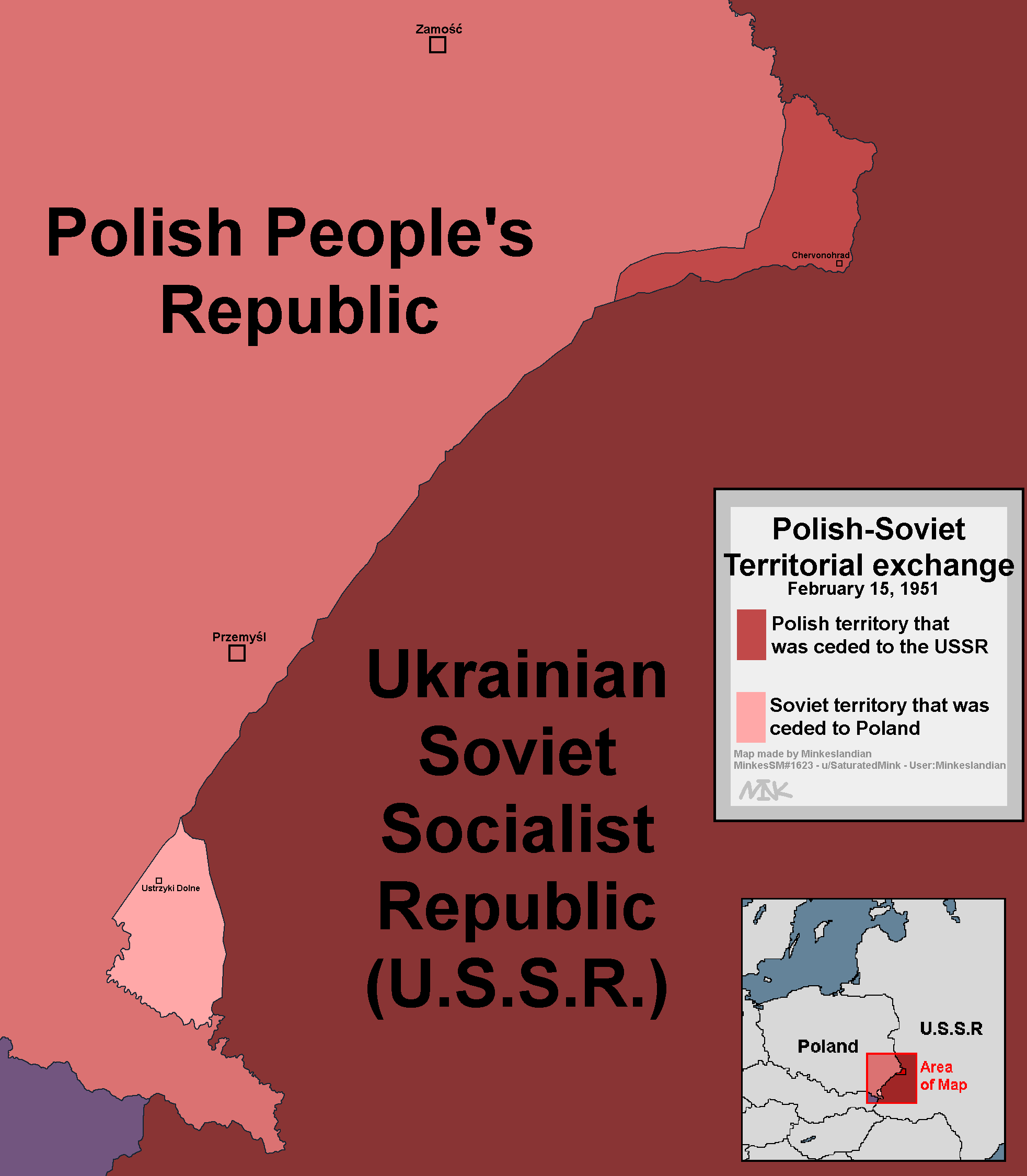
Map showing the border adjustment. The territory ceded by Poland is marked in red, while the territory ceded by the USSR is marked in pink.

The 1951 Polish-Soviet territorial exchange, also known as the Polish-Soviet border adjustment treaty of 1951, was a border agreement signed in Moscow between Soviet Union and the Polish People’s Republic. It involved approximately 480 km^{2} (185 sq mi) of land along their shared border. The treaty was signed on 15 February 1951, ratified by Poland on 28 May 1951, and by the Soviet Union on 31 May. It modified the border treaty of 16 August 1945, and came into effect on 5 June 1951. Since Poland was a satellite state within the Soviet sphere of influence, the exchange favored the Soviet Union economically due to the valuable coal deposits relinquished by Poland. Following the agreement, the Soviets constructed four large coal mines within eight years, with a combined annual mining capacity of 15 million tons.

In return, the Soviet Union transferred part of the Drohobych Oblast (1939-1959) of the Ukrainian Soviet Socialist Republic. The areas ceded included the city of Ustrzyki Dolne and the villages of Czarna (Ukrainian: Чорна Chorna), Shevchenko (which later regained its prewar Polish name of Lutowiska in 1957), Krościenko, Bandrów Narodowy, Bystre, and Liskowate. This territory was incorporated into the Krosno Voivodeship in 1975 and subsequently became part of the Subcarpathian Voivodeship on 1 January 1999. The Ukrainian SSR, as a constituent Soviet republic, did not have a say in this process.

As part of the exchange, Poland relinquished a portion of the Lublin Voivodeship, which included the cities of Bełz (Ukrainian: Белз, Belz), Uhnów (Угнів, Uhniv), Krystynopol (Кристинопіль, Krystynopil, now Sheptytskyi), and Waręż (Варяж, Variazh). This territory now forms part of the Sheptytskyi Raion in the Lviv Oblast of Ukraine.

== Background ==
After World War II, Poland underwent significant territorial changes as it shifted westward. The country acquired the former German provinces of Silesia and Pomerania, along with the eastern portion of Brandenburg and the southern part of East Prussia. The country's eastern border was roughly established along the Curzon Line, resulting in Białystok remaining part of Poland while Lviv became part of Soviet Ukraine.

The border between Poland and the Soviet Union, as defined by the 1945 agreement, remained essentially unchanged until the early 1950s, with a minor correction occurring in 1948 when the village of Medyka near Przemyśl was transferred to Poland. However, the discovery of extensive coal deposits in the region known as the Bug River bend prompted the Soviet government to seek control over this territory, which boasted not only valuable coal resources but also fertile black soil.

== Negotiations ==
The government of Poland formally requested the government of the Soviet Union to exchange a small section of the Polish border with a corresponding area of Soviet territory. This territory was part of the Ukrainian SSR and is now located along the border between Poland and independent Ukraine.

Negotiations took place in Moscow between January and February 1951, with both delegations attempting to downplay the value of the territories they would receive. Initially, the Soviets proposed taking almost all of the Tomaszowski and Hrubieszowski powiats, including the bend of the Bug River, while highlighting the rich forests and oil in the Bieszczady Mountains area as compensation. Stanisław Leszczycki, a well-known geographer serving as the Polish deputy minister of foreign affairs at the time, discreetly advised against such an exchange. Consequently, the Poles rejected the original agreement. Despite Leszczycki being dismissed from his post at the end of 1950, the deal was ultimately limited to the Bug River knee, and Poland would receive a portion of the Bieszczady Mountains, including the town of Ustrzyki Dolne. Soviet Deputy Minister of Foreign Affairs Anatoly Lavrentiev repeatedly emphasized that the Soviet Union was giving Poland lands of great natural wealth. He also downplayed the significance of the railway line from Kovel to Lvov (now Lviv) for Soviet Ukraine, which the Soviets would gain control over.

In response to the Polish negotiators, Ukrainian deputy prime minister Leonid Korniyets downplayed the value of the territory to be ceded to the Soviets, citing poor survey results, despite coal deposits being identified before the war. Initially, it was proposed that Poland compensate the Soviets for the difference in the valuation of the surrendered territory. However, Polish negotiators did not agree to this solution and remained adamant about their demands for additional towns: Nyzhankovychi, Dobromyl, and Khyriv. When Aleksander Zawadzki expressed concern that the railway line to Ustrzyki Dolne, which would be transferred to Poland, would run through the territory of the Ukrainian SSR, the Soviet representatives did not react at all.

== Agreement concerning the exchange ==
On 15 February 1951, the governments of the Republic of Poland and the Soviet Union signed a bill ratifying the change of Poland's eastern border. Officially, the Polish side declared that the exchange occurred at Warsaw's initiative. However, in the early 1950s, Poland was de facto controlled by the Soviet Union, and all relevant decisions were made by Joseph Stalin.

In the final agreement, Poland transferred 480 km^{2} (185 sq mi) of territory, known as the "Sokal Land," located west of the town of Sokal (Sokalshchyna) in Hrubieszów County, Lublin Voivodeship, to the Ukrainian Soviet Socialist Republic. This territory included the towns of Bełz (now Belz), Krystynopol (Sheptytskyi), and Uhnów (Uhniv), as well as the Rawa Ruska–Krystynopol rail line. These towns are currently situated in Sheptytskyi Raion of Lviv Oblast.

According to the agreement, all real estate left behind in the exchanged territories, including infrastructure, buildings, farms, and rail lines, automatically transferred to the new owner, and both sides renounced any future claims. Private individuals could keep movable goods, provided they were taken with them upon departure. The Polish population of Sokalshchyna was relocated in May 1951, primarily to the Recovered Territories that Poland had acquired from Germany in 1945. The residents of the town of Bełz settled in Ustrzyki Dolne.

== Results ==
As a result of the exchange, trains of the Polish State Railways on the railway from Zagórz to Przemyśl passed through the territory of Soviet Ukraine. They were accompanied by conductors and guard dogs, with border guards stationed on the wagon steps.

Although the territory ceded to Poland was roughly equal to the land transferred to the Soviet Union, the area surrounding Ustrzyki Dolne lacked industry, natural resources, and fertile soil. Moreover, it had been depopulated mainly during the 1947 Polish-Soviet Operation Vistula. The prospect of obtaining oil resources in that region was highly doubtful. Polish geologists were well aware that the offer referred to small pond resources similar to those near Krosno, Jasło, and Gorlice. These resources were accurately depicted on geological maps, and their production of 85 tons per day had no significant impact on Poland's raw material imports.

Between 1968 and 1969, under the Polish government of Władysław Gomułka, the 664 m (2,178 ft) long and 81 m (266 ft) high hydroelectric Solina Dam was completed on the San River, just downstream from the exchanged territory. The resulting Lake Solina now encompasses some ceded lands.

The territory acquired by Poland is currently part of Bieszczady County in the Subcarpathian Voivodeship.

== Plans for another exchange ==
In November 1952, the Soviet Union proposed annexing an even more significant portion of Polish territory in the same area, measuring 1,300 km^{2} (502 sq mi) and inhabited by over 100,000 people. This proposal aimed to accommodate the Soviet Union's plans for expanding its coal industry. Under this plan, Poland would have ceded significant parts of Hrubieszów and Tomaszów counties, including the town of Hrubieszów and the former towns of Tyszowce, Horodło, and Kryłów.

In return, Poland would have received a portion of Drohobych Oblast, specifically the town of Khyriv (Chyrów), and the entirety of the Przemyśl–Zagórz railway. This railway had been split by the Polish–Soviet border in 1945 and had previously been requested by the Polish delegation in 1951 but was rejected by Soviet officials then. The second territorial exchange proposal was abandoned following Stalin's death on 5 March 1953, and it never came to fruition.

== See also ==
- Territorial changes of Poland after World War II
- Polish areas annexed by the Soviet Union
- Curzon Line
- Kresy
- List of national border changes since World War I
- History of the Ukrainian minority in Poland
  - Population exchange between Poland and Soviet Ukraine
  - Operation Vistula
- Polish minority in Ukraine
  - Repatriation of Poles (1944–1946)#From Ukraine
  - Repatriation of Poles (1955–1959)
- Polish-Ukrainian border
