= Polish civil war =

Polish civil war may refer to:

- Pagan reaction in Poland (1030s)
- 12th-15th centuries: numerous small conflicts of the time of fragmentation of Poland, particularly in the Duchies of Silesia
- Chicken War (1537)
- First War of the Polish Succession (1587–1588)
- late 16th - mid 17th century: various Cossack uprisings
- Zebrzydowski Rebellion (1606–08)
- Lubomirski's Rokosz (1665–66)
- Civil war in the Grand Duchy of Lithuania (1700, part of the Polish-Lithuanian Commonwealth)
- Civil war in Poland (1704–06)
- Tarnogród Confederation (1715–1716)
- Second War of the Polish Succession (1733–1738)
- Bar Confederation (1768–1772)
- Targowica Confederation (1792)
- May coup d'état (1926)
- Lesko uprising (1932)
- Polish anti-communist resistance (1945–1950s)
- History of Solidarity (1980–1989)
