= Collectivization in the Polish People's Republic =

The Polish People's Republic pursued a policy of agricultural collectivization throughout the Stalinist regime period, from 1948 until the liberalization during Gomułka's thaw of 1956. However, Poland was the unique country in the Eastern Bloc where large-scale collectivization failed to take root. A legacy of collectivization in Poland was the network of inefficient State Agricultural Farms (PGRs), many of which can still be seen in the countryside of modern Poland, especially in its northern and western provinces (the Recovered Territories).

== Origins ==
The Central Committee of the Polish Workers' Party decided in September 1948 to collectivize Polish farms, acting on the June 20, 1948 Bucharest resolution of the Cominform, which stipulated that collectivization should start in all Communist countries. In July 1948, during a Politburo meeting, the Minister of Industry and Commerce, Hilary Minc, gave a speech on private ownership in the Polish economy. Referring to Lenin's notion of the "permanent rebirth of capitalism", Minc announced the transformation of the Polish economy into a socialist one.

The process of restructuring Polish agriculture was officially presented as protection for small farmers, whose position the rich kulaks allegedly endangered. The restructuring was supposed to take place in the "fire of the class struggle". Minc saw the kulak as a "village capitalist", who "exploits other peasants". Given this imprecise definition, Party officials decided that a Polish kulak was a farmer whose farm was larger than 15 hectares (in Southern and Eastern Poland - 8 to 10 hectares). Furthermore, those farmers who had at least two horses were identified as kulaks, so any Polish peasant who ran his farm properly could have been accused of being a kulak.

Despite the widespread use of force, by 1951 only 2200 cooperatives operated in Poland - they occupied only 0.8% of arable land, and had some 23,000 members. The cooperatives were divided into groups, such as Associations of Land Cultivation (Zrzeszenia Uprawy Ziemi, ZUZ), which kept private ownership of tools and machines, and Farmer’s Cooperative Teams (Rolnicze Zespoły Spółdzielcze, RZS), in which both land and machines were collective. Most members of these cooperatives were poor peasants, who had received land during the land reforms of 1944 - 1948. Since the Polish peasantry mostly opposed giving up their land, in June 1952 several repressive measures were introduced against those who resisted collectivization. Their houses were searched, they were arrested, extra tax and quotas were imposed on them, their machines and goods were illegally destroyed. Furthermore, there were financial fees; between 1948 and 1955, some 1.5 million farmers were fined and some ended up in labour camps and prisons.

== High pressure ==
In 1952, after special privileges were introduced for collective farms, the number of such establishments grew. A year later there were 7,800 collective farms, which occupied 6.7% of the arable land in Poland. In 1955 the number of such farms reached 9,800, covering 9.2% of Poland’s arable land, with 205,000 farmers. An average collective farm in Poland employed approximately 20 people and covered 80 hectares, with 65 livestock. In comparison to privately owned farms, productivity at collective farms was low. In 1949 State Agricultural Farms, or PGRs (Polish: Państwowe Gospodarstwo Rolne) were created. In course of time these farms came to control approximately 10% of Poland’s arable land. Like collective farms, the PGRs were inefficient, with low productivity.

Polish farmers fiercely resisted collectivization. In some cases, they cut down forests that were marked for nationalization. According to sources, peasants feared collectivization more than a hypothetical future World War Three, hoping that such a war would help them to keep their land. However, a number of poor peasants, influenced by official propaganda, supported the changes, hoping that their quality of life would improve. Collectivization was more widespread in the so-called Recovered Territories, where settlers were not emotionally connected to the land. Collectivization and persecution of private farmers, on whom quotas were enforced, led to a collapse of Polish agricultural production after 1950, and a large-scale exodus of villagers. Furthermore, government planners decided that the national budget would favor financing heavy industry at the expense of agriculture. As a result, farms experienced shortages of fertilizers, pesticides, machinery and tools. Official propaganda blamed "Western imperialists", "saboteurs" and kulaks for these problems. One of the main factors determining the weakness of the socialist economy was the phenomenon of hidden unemployment, which means excessive employment in industrial plants in relation to needs.

== Decline ==
After the political changes of the Polish October of 1956, Władysław Gomułka officially recognized private farming as a specific element of the so-called "Polish road to Socialism", and the government changed its course. The number of collective farms declined. In September 1956, Poland had had some 10,000 of them. On December 31 of the same year, the number of such farms had reduced to fewer than 2,000.

The idea of collectivization returned in the early 1970s, after Gomułka's successor as First Secretary, Edward Gierek, visited Moscow in January 1971; there General Secretary Leonid Brezhnev stated that Gomułka had not carried out collectivization and that that accounted for his "problems". However, the position of private farmers had become well-established in Poland by that time, and after some attempts at promotion, the Polish government abandoned the policy of expanding collectivization.
