= Hoszów =

- Village
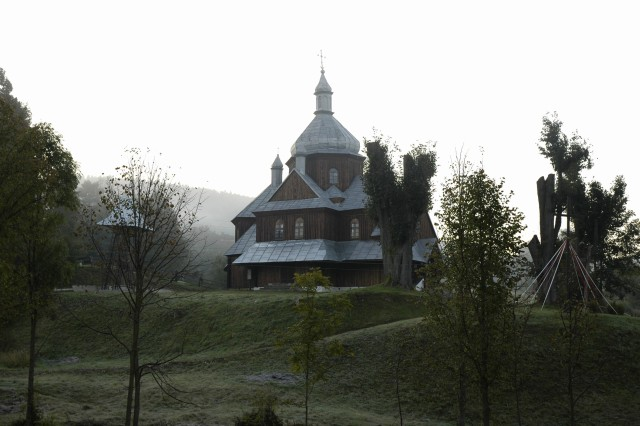
- Greek Catholic church of Saint Nicholas

- Location within Poland
- Coordinates: 49°24′N 22°39′E
- Country: Poland
- Voivodeship: Subcarpathian
- County: Bieszczady
- Gmina: Ustrzyki Dolne

Hoszów (Polish: [ˈxɔʂuf]) is a village in the administrative district of Gmina Ustrzyki Dolne, within Bieszczady County, Subcarpathian Voivodeship, in south-eastern Poland.

On 8 August 1769 in a battle against Russian troops during the Bar Confederation, Franciszek Pułaski, cousin of general Kazimierz Pułaski, was heavily injured and died afterwards in Lesko.
