= Yamna =

Yamna may refer to:

- Yamna culture, or Yamnaya, Pit Grave, or Ochre Grave culture, early Bronze Age culture on the Russian steppes
- Yamna language, or Sunum, an Austronesian language spoken on the coast and an island of Jayapura Bay in Papua province, Indonesia

== People ==
- Yamna Oubouhou (born 1974)
- Yamna Lobos (born 1983)

== See also ==
- Yanma
- Jamna (disambiguation)
