= Hoszowczyk =

- Village
- Location within Poland
- Coordinates: 49°24′N 22°37′E
- Country: Poland
- Voivodeship: Subcarpathian
- County: Bieszczady
- Gmina: Ustrzyki Dolne

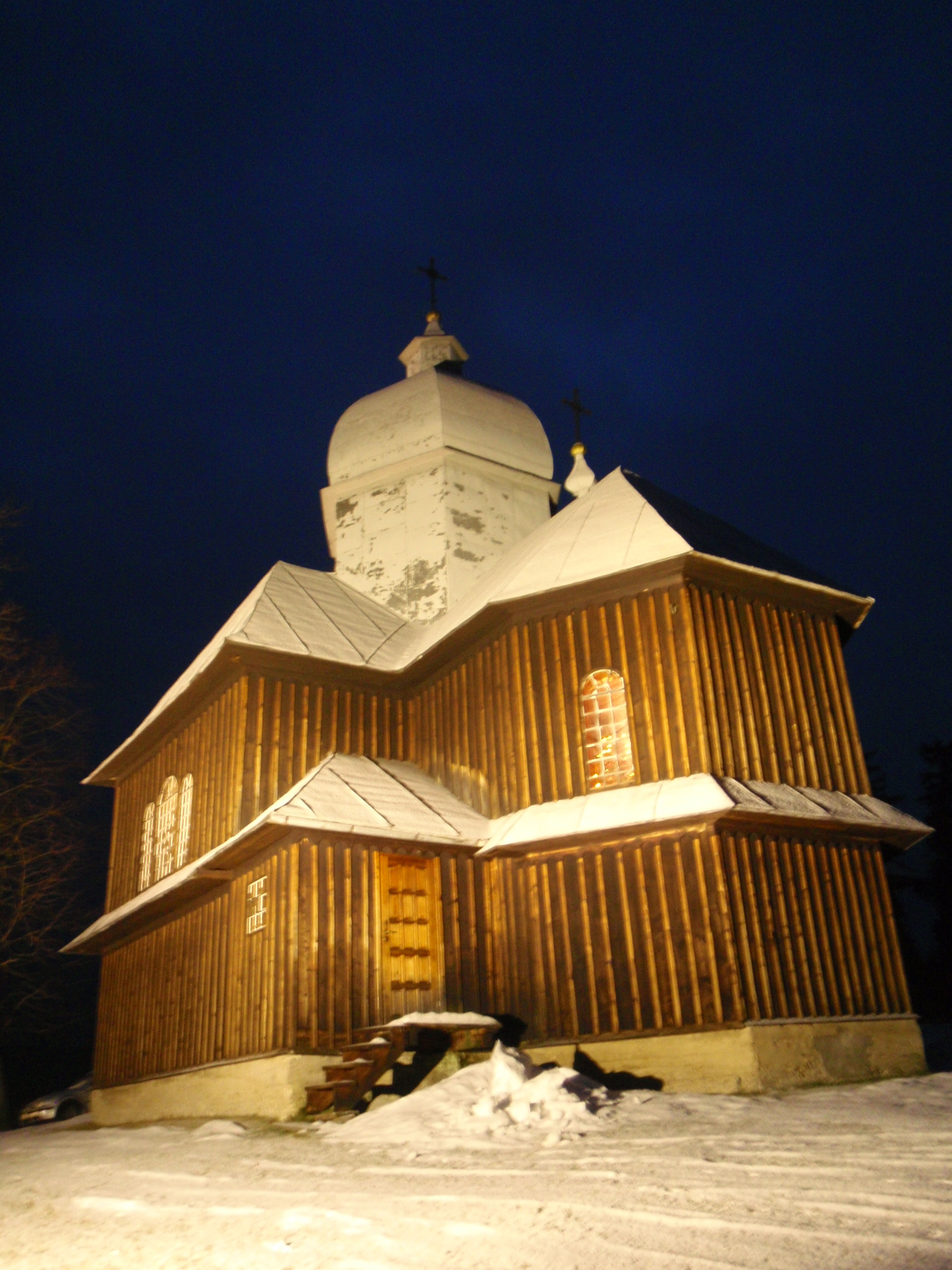
Greek Catholic church.

Hoszowczyk [xɔˈʂɔft͡ʂɨk] is a village in the administrative district of Gmina Ustrzyki Dolne, within Bieszczady County, Subcarpathian Voivodeship, in south-eastern Poland.
