= Kwaszenina =

- Village
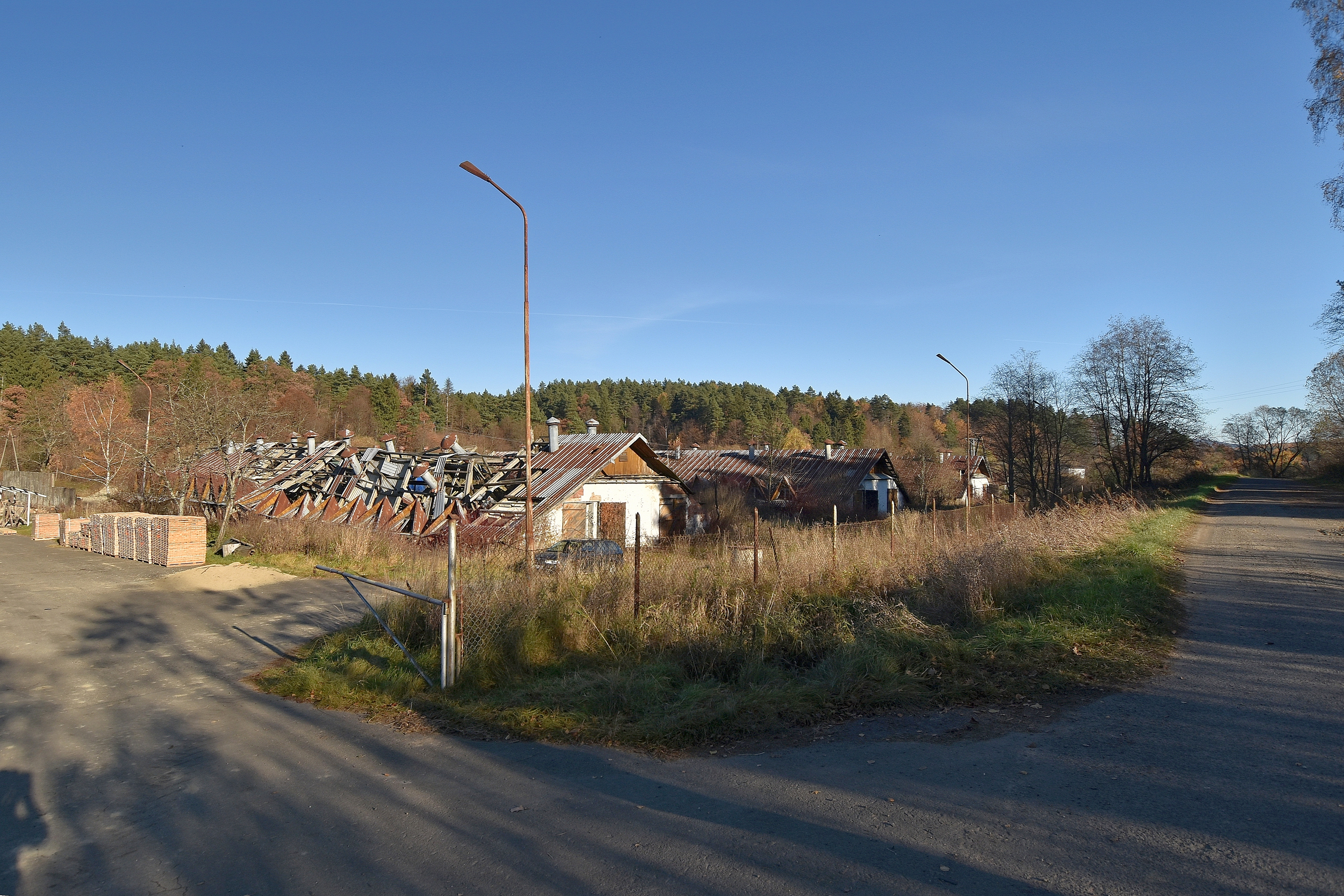
- Former Military Farm in Kwaszenina
- Interactive map of Kwaszenina
- Location within Poland
- Coordinates: 49°33′N 22°40′E
- Country: Poland
- Voivodeship: Subcarpathian
- County: Bieszczady
- Gmina: Ustrzyki Dolne
- Time zone: UTC+1 (CET)
  - Summer (DST): UTC+2 (CEST)
- Postal code: 37-722
- Area code: +48 13

Kwaszenina [kfaʂɛˈɲina] is a village in the administrative district of Gmina Ustrzyki Dolne, within Bieszczady County, Subcarpathian Voivodeship, in south-eastern Poland, near the border with Ukraine.
