= Bandrów Narodowy =

- Village
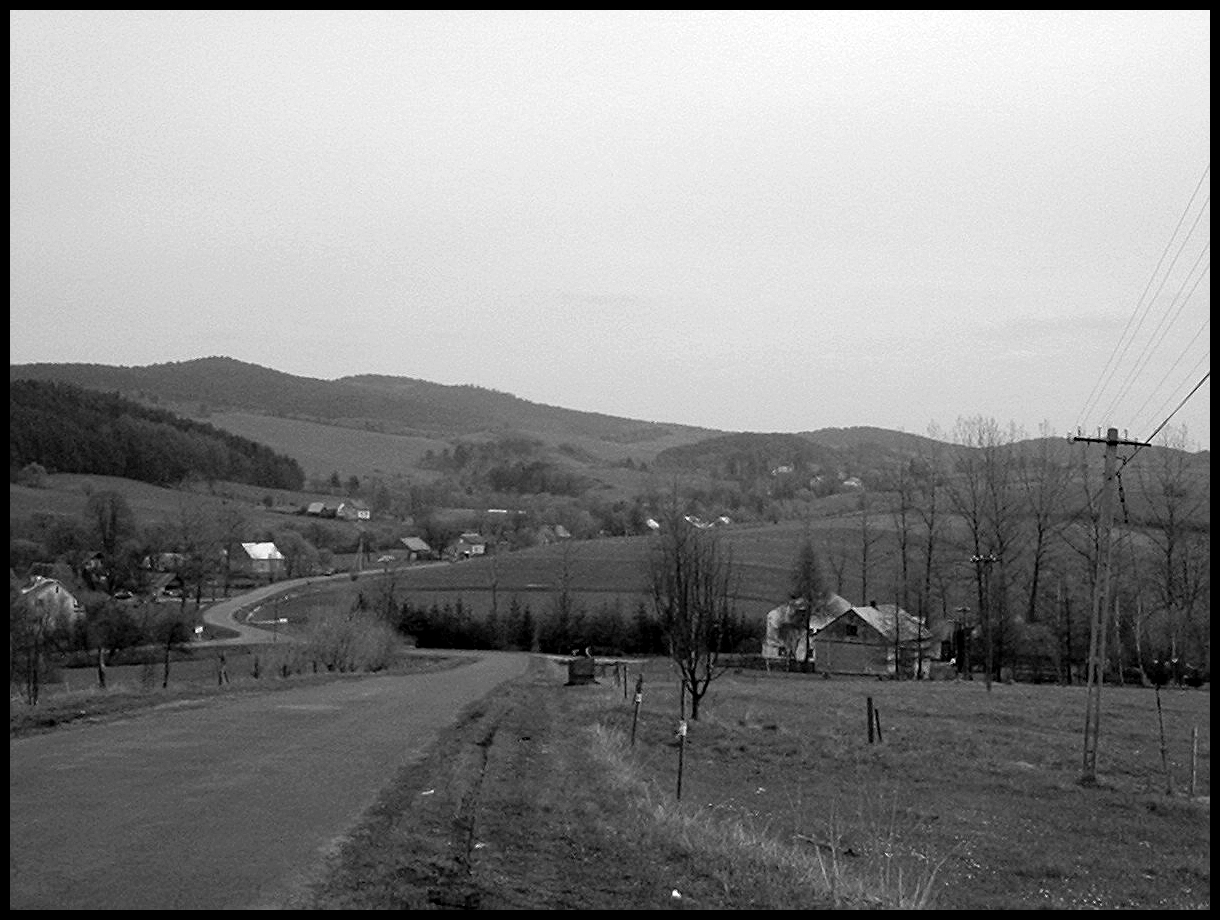
- Bandrów Narodowy

- Location within Poland
- Coordinates: 49°24′N 22°42′E
- Country: Poland
- Voivodeship: Subcarpathian
- County: Bieszczady
- Gmina: Ustrzyki Dolne
- Population (approx.): 500

Bandrów Narodowy [ˈbandruf narɔˈdɔvɨ] is a village in the administrative district of Gmina Ustrzyki Dolne, within Bieszczady County, Subcarpathian Voivodeship, in south-eastern Poland, near the border with Ukraine.

== See also ==
- 1951 Polish–Soviet territorial exchange
