= Równia, Podkarpackie Voivodeship =

Równia
- Village
- Location within Poland
- Coordinates: 49°25′N 22°36′E
- Country: Poland
- Voivodeship: Subcarpathian
- County: Bieszczady
- Gmina: Ustrzyki Dolne
- Population: 480

Równia [ˈruvɲa] is a village in the administrative district of Gmina Ustrzyki Dolne, within Bieszczady County, Subcarpathian Voivodeship, in south-eastern Poland.
