= Jureczkowa =

- Village
- Interactive map of Jureczkowa
- Location within Poland
- Coordinates: 49°32′N 22°35′E
- Country: Poland
- Voivodeship: Subcarpathian
- County: Bieszczady
- Gmina: Ustrzyki Dolne

Jureczkowa [jurɛt͡ʂˈkɔva] is a village in the administrative district of Gmina Ustrzyki Dolne, within Bieszczady County, Subcarpathian Voivodeship, in south-eastern Poland, near the border with Ukraine.
