= Brelików =

- Village
- Location within Poland
- Coordinates: 49°31′N 22°31′E
- Country: Poland
- Voivodeship: Subcarpathian
- County: Bieszczady
- Gmina: Ustrzyki Dolne

Brelików [brɛˈlʲikuf] is a village in the administrative district of Gmina Ustrzyki Dolne, within Bieszczady County, Subcarpathian Voivodeship, in south-eastern Poland.
