= Jawor (mountain) =

Mountain in Poland

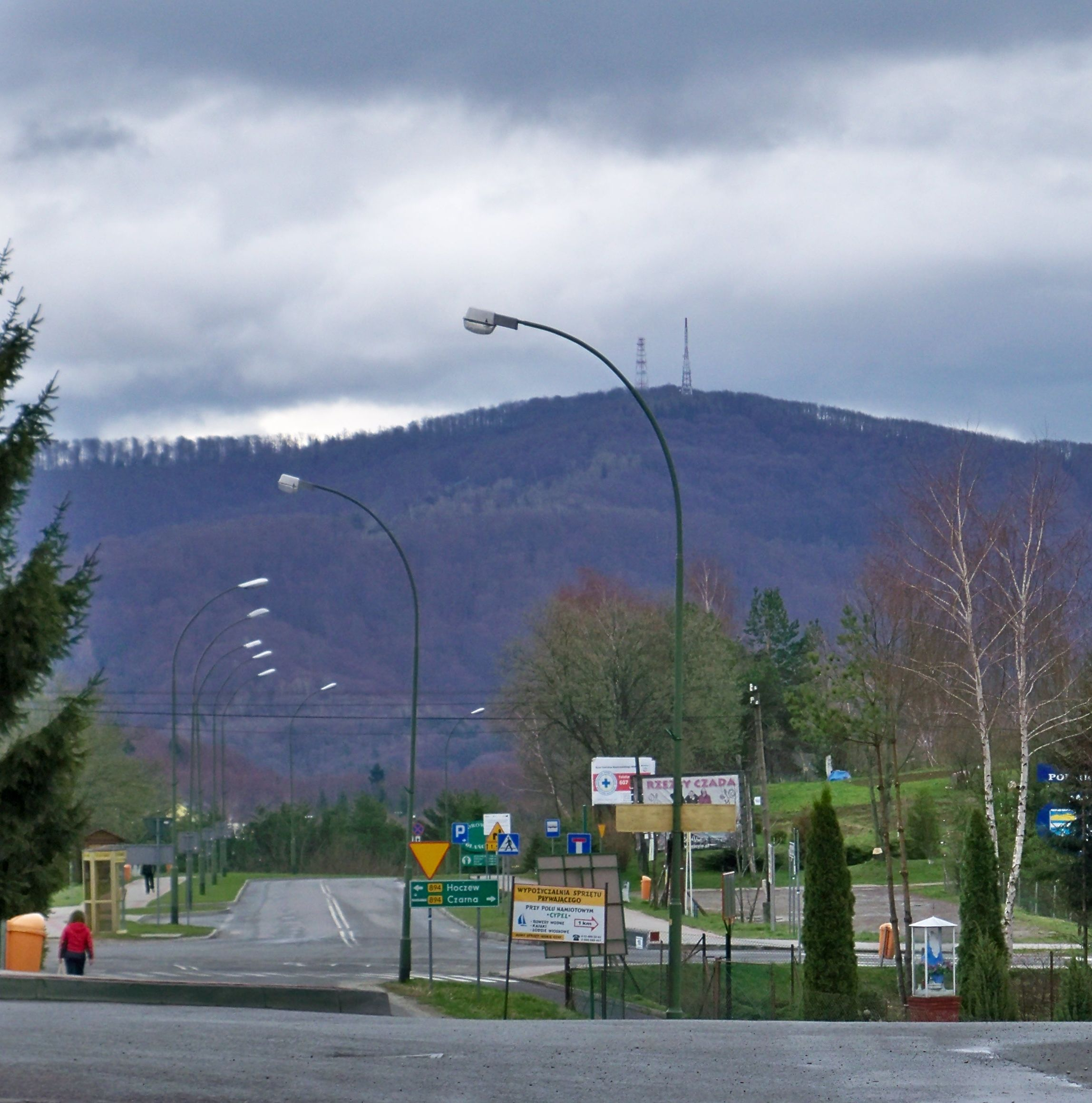
- Jawor Mountain

Highest point
- Elevation: 741 m (2,431 ft)
- Prominence: 211 m (692 ft)
- Coordinates: 49°23′03″N 22°29′37″E

Geography
- Location within Poland
- Parent range: Sanocko-Turczańskie Mountains

Jawor is a peak and massif in the Sanocko-Turczańskie Mountains, located next to the Lake Solina. Łoboźnicy valley is surrounding the peak and Lake Solina by the Gulf of Teleśnicka, while to the East the Żuków mountain range is separated by a pass at 530 metres.

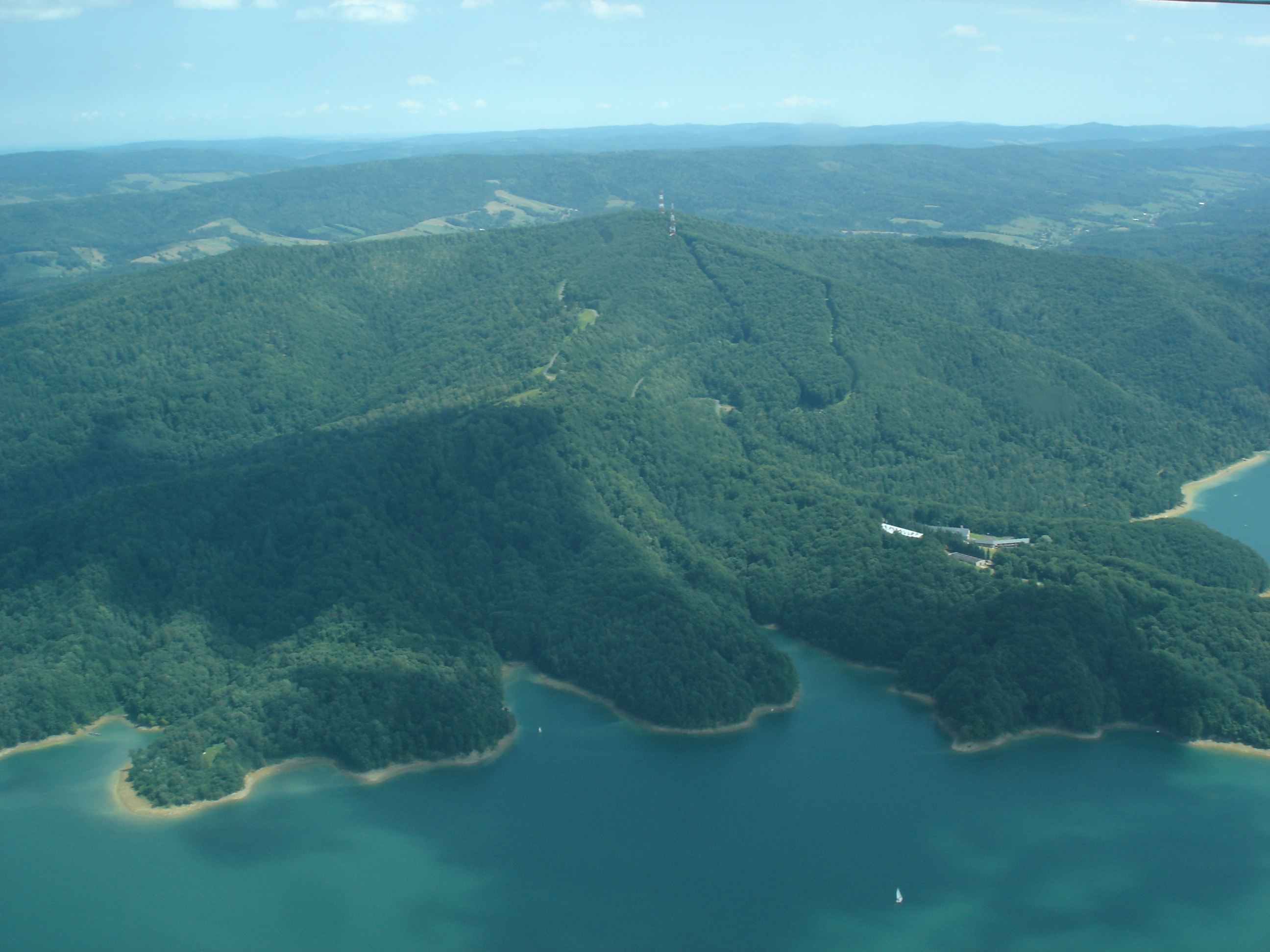
Jawor Mountain

From the top of the main peak where the TON Góra Jawor radio mast is located, two ridges from the North-Eastern and South-Western points come off with culminations of 702 and 608 metres. By the side of the Jawor reservoir is a complex of leisure facilities and buildings. Łobozew Dolny has an asphalt road connection which weaves around the mountain up to 700 metres, and steadily declines down to the complex.

On the southwestern slope, near the peak, a ski lift is located, but there are no designated tourist trails along the massif.
