= Gmina Ustrzyki Dolne =

Gmina Ustrzyki Dolne Ustrzyki Dolne Commune
- Gmina
- Coat of arms
- Interactive map of Gmina Ustrzyki Dolne
- Coordinates (Ustrzyki Dolne): 49°26′N 22°36′E
- Country: Poland
- Voivodeship: Subcarpathian
- County: Bieszczady
- Seat: Ustrzyki Dolne

Area
  - Total: 477.7 km^{2} (184.4 sq mi)

Population (2006)
  - Total: 17,623
  - Density: 36.89/km^{2} (95.55/sq mi)
  - Urban: 9,478
  - Rural: 8,145
- Website: http://www.ustrzyki-dolne.pl

Gmina Ustrzyki Dolne is an urban-rural gmina (administrative district) in Bieszczady County, Subcarpathian Voivodeship, in south-eastern Poland. Its seat is the town of Ustrzyki Dolne, which lies approximately 80 kilometres (50 mi) south-east of the regional capital Rzeszów.

The gmina covers an area of 477.7 square kilometres (184.4 sq mi), and as of 2006 its total population is 17,623 (out of which the population of Ustrzyki Dolne amounts to 9,478, and the population of the rural part of the gmina is 8,145).

The gmina contains part of the protected area called Słonne Mountains Landscape Park.

== Villages ==
Apart from the town of Ustrzyki Dolne, Gmina Ustrzyki Dolne contains the villages and settlements of Arłamów, Bandrów Narodowy, Brelików, Brzegi Dolne, Dźwiniacz Dolny, Grąziowa, Hoszów, Hoszowczyk, Jałowe, Jamna Dolna, Jamna Górna, Jureczkowa, Krościenko, Kwaszenina, Leszczowate, Liskowate, Łobozew Dolny, Łobozew Górny, Łodyna, Moczary, Nowosielce Kozickie, Ropienka, Równia, Serednica, Stańkowa, Teleśnica Oszwarowa, Trójca, Trzcianiec, Ustjanowa Dolna, Ustjanowa Górna, Wojtkowa, Wojtkówka, Wola Romanowa, Zadwórze and Zawadka.

== Neighbouring gminas ==
Gmina Ustrzyki Dolne is bordered by the gminas of Bircza, Czarna, Fredropol, Olszanica and Solina.
