= Stańkowa, Podkarpackie Voivodeship =

Stańkowa
- Village
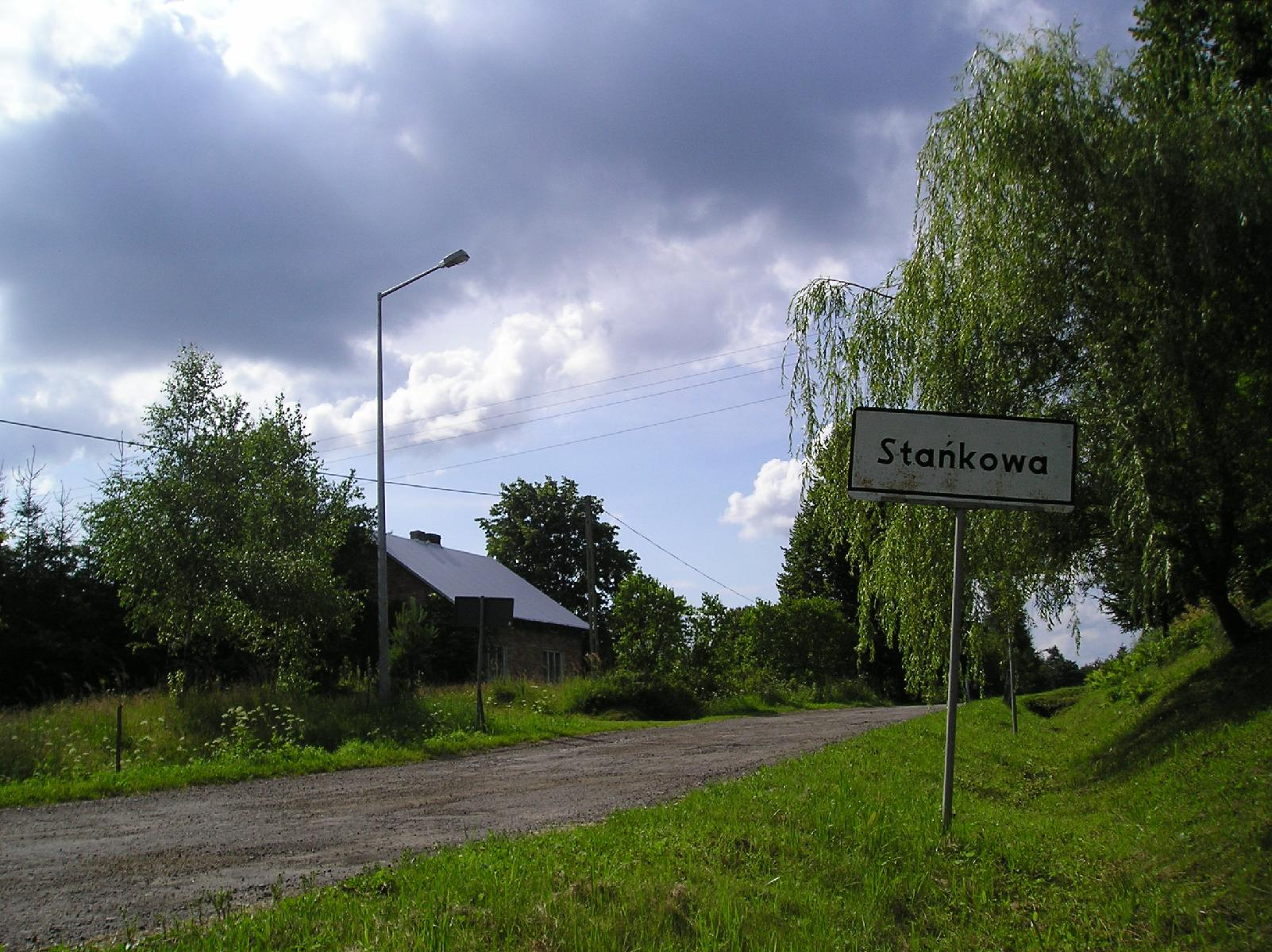

- Location within Poland
- Coordinates: 49°33′4″N 22°26′51″E
- Country: Poland
- Voivodeship: Subcarpathian
- County: Bieszczady
- Gmina: Ustrzyki Dolne

Stańkowa [staɲˈkɔva] is a village in the administrative district of Gmina Ustrzyki Dolne, within Bieszczady County, Subcarpathian Voivodeship, in south-eastern Poland.
