= Trójca, Podkarpackie Voivodeship =

Trójca
- Village
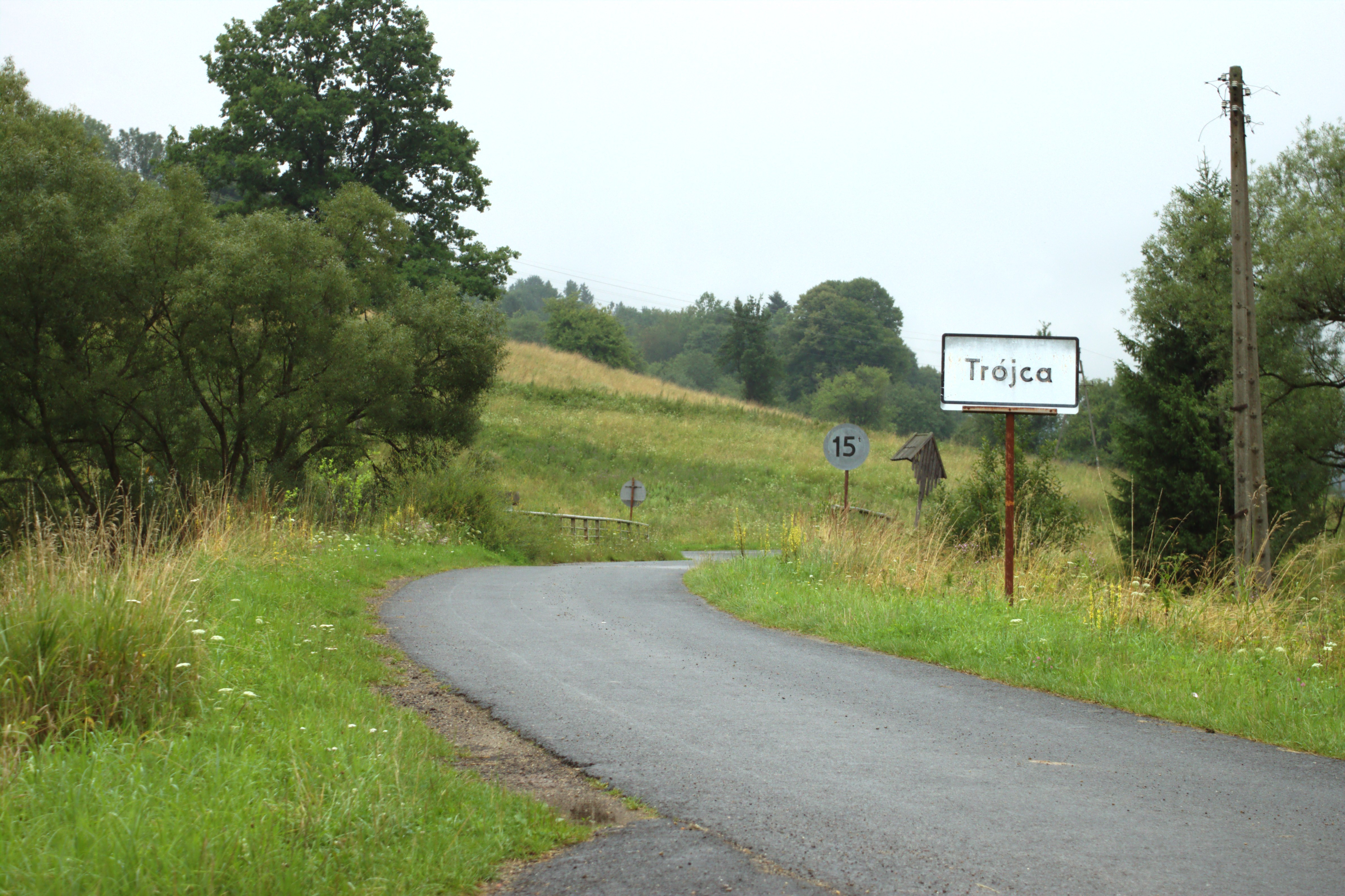
- Arriving in Trójca

- Location within Poland
- Coordinates: 49°40′N 22°34′E
- Country: Poland
- Voivodeship: Subcarpathian
- County: Bieszczady
- Gmina: Ustrzyki Dolne

Trójca [ˈtrui̯t͡sa] is a village in the administrative district of Gmina Ustrzyki Dolne, within Bieszczady County, Subcarpathian Voivodeship, in south-eastern Poland.
