= Liskowate =

- Village
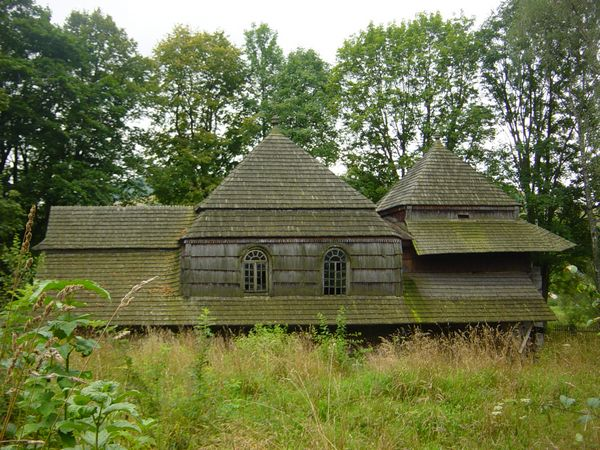
- Greek Catholic church of the Nativity of the Virgin Mary
- Interactive map of Liskowate
- Location within Poland
- Coordinates: 49°31′N 22°37′E
- Country: Poland
- Voivodeship: Subcarpathian
- County: Bieszczady
- Gmina: Ustrzyki Dolne

Liskowate [lʲiskɔˈvatɛ] is a village in the administrative district of Gmina Ustrzyki Dolne, within Bieszczady County, in the Subcarpathian Voivodeship of south-eastern Poland, near the border with Ukraine.

== See also ==
- 1951 Polish–Soviet territorial exchange
