= Wola Romanowa =

- Village
- Location within Poland
- Coordinates: 49°28′48″N 22°31′57″E
- Country: Poland
- Voivodeship: Subcarpathian
- County: Bieszczady
- Gmina: Ustrzyki Dolne

Wola Romanowa [ˈvɔla rɔmaˈnɔva] is a village in the administrative district of Gmina Ustrzyki Dolne, within Bieszczady County, Subcarpathian Voivodeship, in south-eastern Poland.
