= Ropienka =

- Village
- Location within Poland
- Coordinates: 49°32′N 22°31′E
- Country: Poland
- Voivodeship: Subcarpathian
- County: Bieszczady
- Gmina: Ustrzyki Dolne
- Population: 12

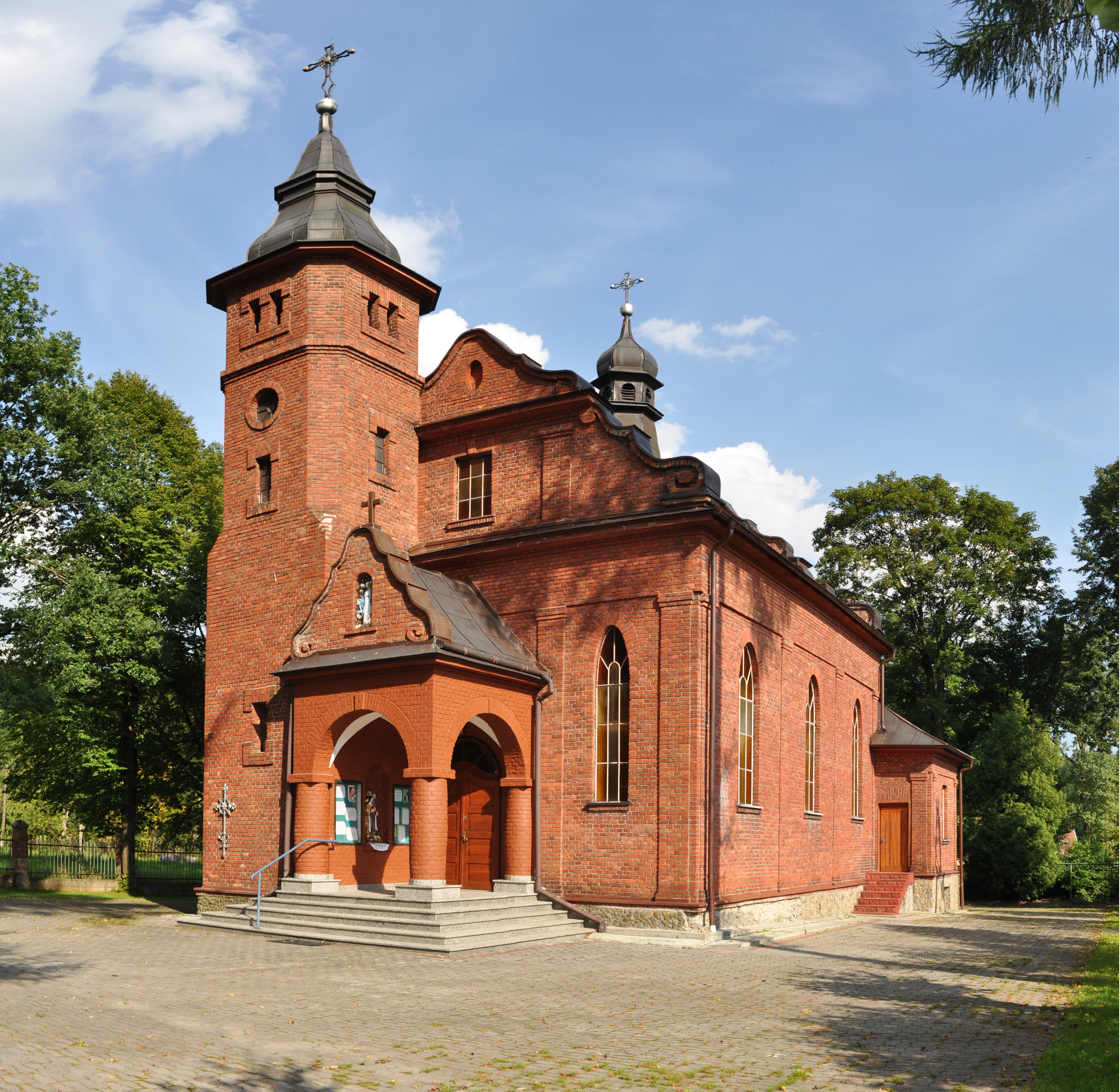
Church in Ropienka

Ropienka [rɔˈpʲɛŋka] is a village in the administrative district of Gmina Ustrzyki Dolne, within Bieszczady County, Subcarpathian Voivodeship, in south-eastern Poland.

== History ==
As a result of the first of Partitions of Poland (Treaty of St-Petersburg dated 5 July 1772), Ropienka (and the Galicia) was attributed to the Habsburg monarchy.

For more details, see Kingdom of Galicia and Lodomeria.

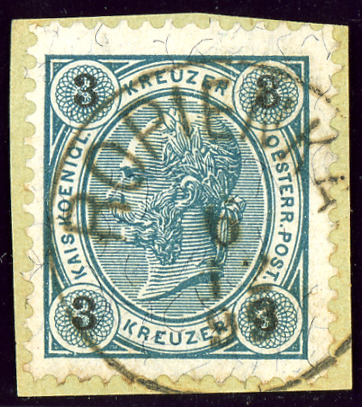
Austrian KK stamp cancelled ROPIENKA in 1893

A post-office was opened in 1890, in the Lisko district.
