= Nowosielce Kozickie =

- Village
- Location within Poland
- Coordinates: 49°34′N 22°32′E
- Country: Poland
- Voivodeship: Subcarpathian
- County: Bieszczady
- Gmina: Ustrzyki Dolne

Nowosielce Kozickie [nɔvɔˈɕɛlt͡sɛ kɔˈʑit͡skʲɛ] is a village in the administrative district of Gmina Ustrzyki Dolne, within Bieszczady County, Subcarpathian Voivodeship, in south-eastern Poland.
