= Jałowe =

- Village
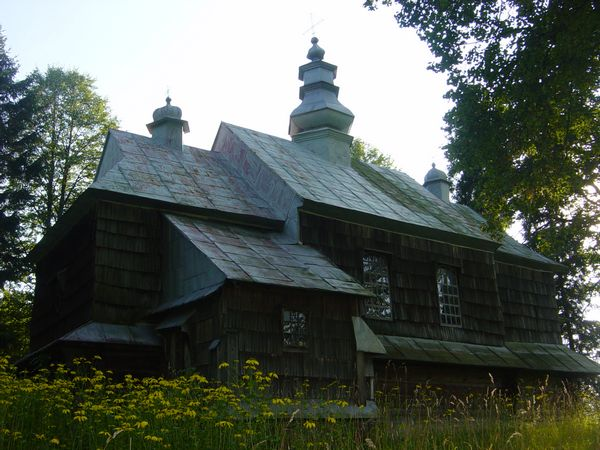
- Formerly Greek Catholic, currently Roman Catholic church

- Location within Poland
- Coordinates: 49°25′N 22°40′E
- Country: Poland
- Voivodeship: Subcarpathian
- County: Bieszczady
- Gmina: Ustrzyki Dolne

Jałowe [jaˈwɔvɛ] is a village in the administrative district of Gmina Ustrzyki Dolne, within Bieszczady County, Subcarpathian Voivodeship, in south-eastern Poland, near the border with Ukraine.
