= Teleśnica Oszwarowa =

- Village
- Location within Poland
- Coordinates: 49°23′N 22°33′E
- Country: Poland
- Voivodeship: Subcarpathian
- County: Bieszczady
- Gmina: Ustrzyki Dolne

Teleśnica Oszwarowa [tɛlɛɕˈɲit͡sa ɔʂfaˈrɔva] is a village in the administrative district of Gmina Ustrzyki Dolne, within Bieszczady County, Subcarpathian Voivodeship, in south-eastern Poland.
