= Jamna Dolna =

- Village
- Location within Poland
- Coordinates: 49°38′N 22°34′E
- Country: Poland
- Voivodeship: Subcarpathian
- County: Bieszczady
- Gmina: Ustrzyki Dolne

Jamna Dolna [ˈjamna ˈdɔlna] is a non-existing village in the administrative district of Gmina Ustrzyki Dolne, within Bieszczady County, Subcarpathian Voivodeship, in south-eastern Poland.
