= Polish–Soviet border agreement of August 1945 =

1945 border agreement

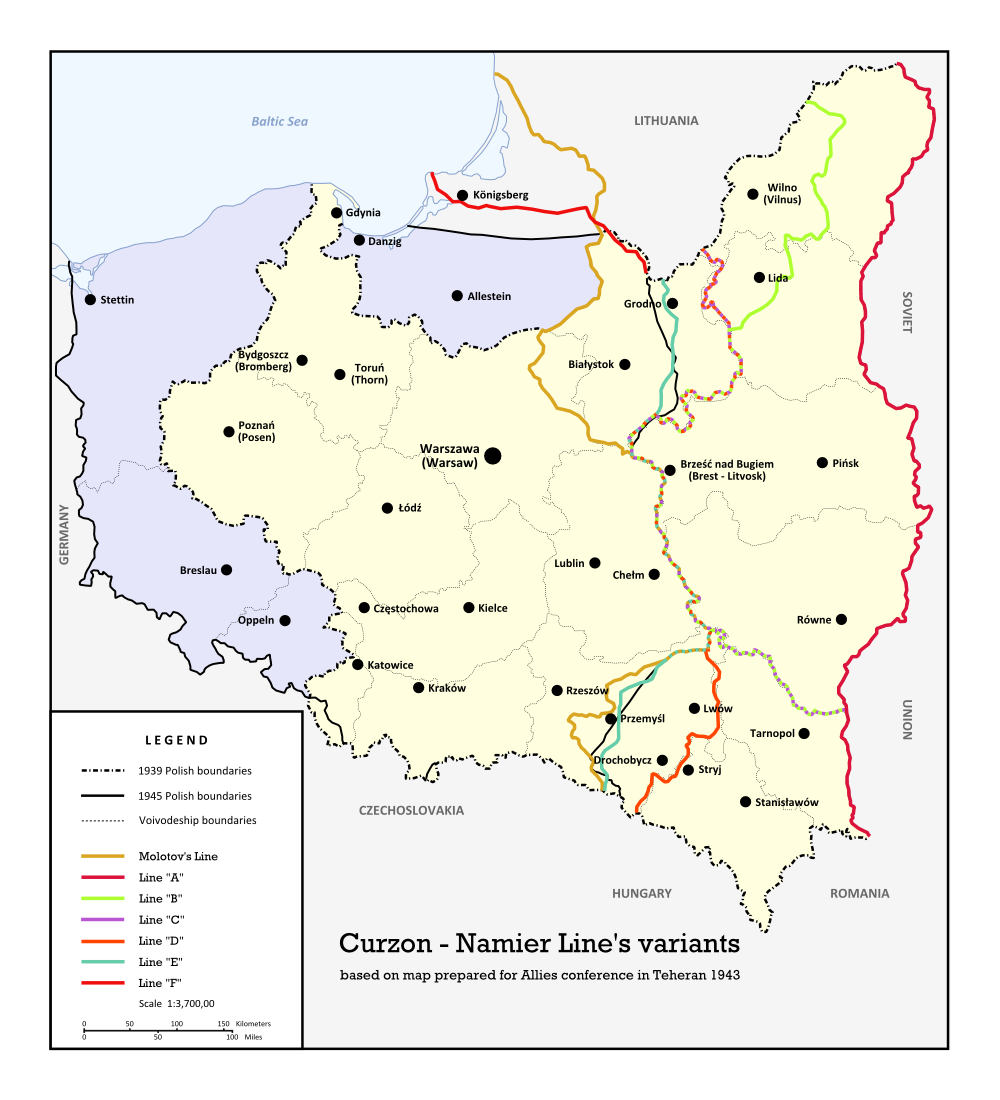
Curzon-Namier Line's variants. Tehran, 1943

The Border Agreement between Poland and the USSR of 16 August 1945 established the borders between the Soviet Union (USSR) and the Polish People's Republic. It was signed by the Polish communist Provisional Government of National Unity. According to the treaty, Poland officially accepted the ceding its pre-war Eastern territory to the USSR (Kresy) which was decided earlier in Yalta already. Some of the territory along the Curzon line, established by Stalin during the course of the war, was returned to Poland. The treaty also recognised the division of the former German East Prussia and ultimately approved the finalised delimitation line between the Soviet Union and Poland: from the Baltic Sea, to the border tripoint with Czechoslovakia in the Carpathians. The agreement entered into force on 5 February 1946.

== Prelude ==
Prior to the First World War, within the Russian Empire Polish territories were administered by a Vistula Land, whose eastern frontier roughly mirrored the ethnic border between the Polish people on the west, and the Ukrainians and Belarusians (then referred to as Little and White Russians respectively) on the east. In Austrian Galicia there was no administrative border which marked the ethnic one between the Polish and the Galician Ukrainians (Ruthenians). Ukrainian territories were also heavily infiltrated by Polish increpancies.

During the First World War, the Russian Civil, the Polish-Soviet and Polish-Ukrainian wars, the territory passed hands several times, and each of the controlling powers tried to create its own administration on the region. During the conflict, the Supreme War Council tried several times to intervene and create an agreeable border between the Second Polish Republic and Bolshevik Russia; the most notable outcome was the border presented by the British Foreign Secretary George Curzon, after whom the proposed line was named. The line mostly followed the 19th century border between the Vistula Land, but also extended further south and portioned Galicia along the rough ethnic border between Poles and Ukrainians.

Though accepted by the Bolshevik government, the line was ignored by Poland, and after the Polish-Soviet War's conclusion, on the Treaty of Riga, Bolshevik Russia recognised a new border almost 250 km east of the Curzon Line. The border was recognised by the League of Nations in 1923, and confirmed by numerous Polish-Soviet treaties and delimited in due course.

== World War II partitions ==
The Molotov–Ribbentrop Pact of August 1939 provided for the partition of the Second Polish Republic between the USSR and Nazi Germany. Following the corresponding invasions, a new border was drawn up, though based on the Curzon Line, deviated west of it in several regions. Most notably, was the Belastok Region, that was added to the Byelorussian Soviet Socialist Republic, although most of the region was populated by Poles.

After Germany's invasion of the USSR, the territory in question was also re-partitioned by the Nazis. Ukraine and Belarus were administered by the occupation Ostland and Reichskommissariat Ukraine Reichskommissariats. Galician territory east of the 1939 border and the Belastok Region plus adjacent territory to the east of this were transformed respectively into the Distrikt Galizien and Bezirk Bialystok, and subjugated directly to the Reich.

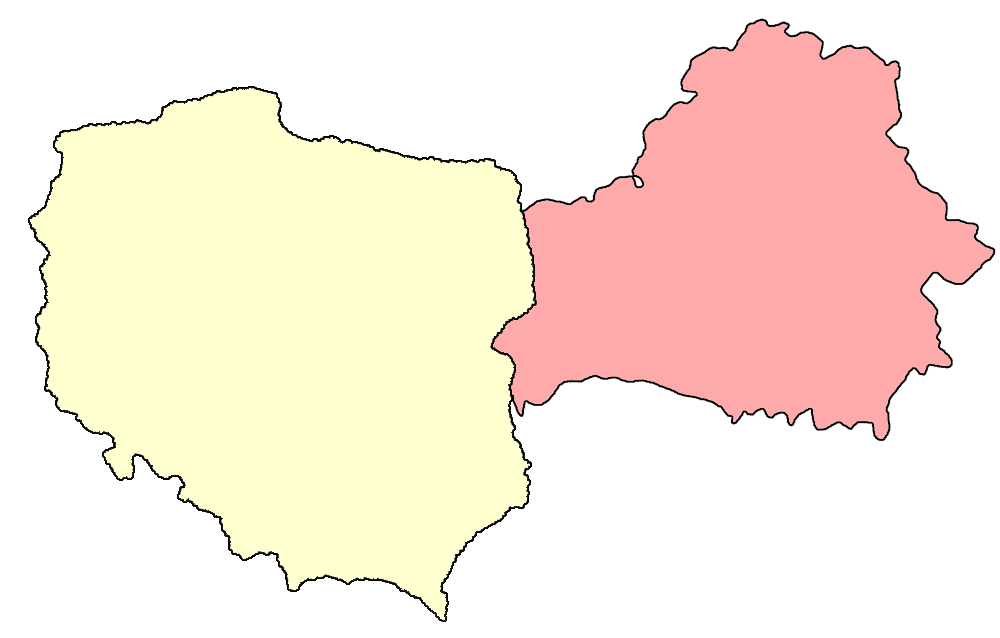
Borders of Poland and Belarus after the agreement

Following the Soviet Union's liberation of Ukraine and Belarus, in 1943/1944 the Tehran Conference and Yalta Conference discussed upon the future of the Polish-Soviet borders, and the Allied leaders recognised the Soviet right to the territory east of the 1939 border. On 29 September, administration of 17 (of the 23) districts of Belastok Region (including the city of Białystok) and an additional three (Siemiatycze, Hajnówka and Kleszczele) of the Brest Region were passed to the Polish Committee of National Liberation from the BSSR.

In October 1944 these were joined by a further transfer of Lubaczów, Horyniec, Laszki, Uhnów and Sieniawa raions of the Lviv Oblast from the Ukrainian Soviet Socialist Republic. In March 1945, an additional batch of land, the Bieszczady, Lesko, and most of Przemyśl raions (including Przemyśl city) were transferred to Poland from the Drohobych Oblast of Ukraine to the now Provisional Government of the Republic of Poland.

Soon afterwards World War II finished, and as the Provisional Government continued to transfer administration from military to civil bodies, it also finalised its new borders with its neighbors, and in particular, the Soviet Union. Soviet claims, which became the main problem preventing cooperation between the Polish government in London and Moscow during the war, were then accepted by PKWN activists in July 1944. Their consent to the Curzon line signed on 27 July 1944 (Relinquishing half of the Białowieża Forest was Stalin's only concession, and representatives of the Polish Committee of National Liberation were afraid to mention the return of Lviv which became part of the Ukrainian SSR) was a condition for sending these activists to Lublin and Chełm.

On 16 August 1945, the border agreement was officially signed by Edward Osóbka-Morawski, on behalf of the Provisional Government of National Unity and Vyacheslav Molotov, the Soviet Minister of Foreign affairs. The exchange of ratified documents occurred on 5 February 1946 in Warsaw, and from that date the agreement was in force.

== Aftermath ==
Although the treaty finalised the 1939 line, with the 1944/45 adjustments, the border would receive a few more alterations. On 15 May 1948, the raion of Medyka was transferred from the Drohobych Oblast of Ukraine to the Republic of Poland. And finally a 1951 Polish–Soviet territorial exchange, saw Poland return its pre-1939 territory of Ustrzyki Dolne raion from the Drohobych Oblast, and instead it passed the USSR part of the Lublin Voivodship, with the cities of Belz, Uhniv, Chervonohrad and Varyazh, (all of which after the Nazi and Soviet Axis invasion of Poland in September 1939 became a part of Poland occupied by the USSR and was allocated to Ukraine in 1939 until 1941 when the Nazis invaded the Soviet Union. It was occupied again in 1944–1945 after the Soviet advance to Berlin). The border between Poland and Belarus, and Poland and Ukraine has remained the same since.
