= Dźwiniacz Dolny =

- Village
- Location within Poland
- Coordinates: 49°28′N 22°34′E
- Country: Poland
- Voivodeship: Subcarpathian
- County: Bieszczady
- Gmina: Ustrzyki Dolne
- Population: 400

Dźwiniacz Dolny ([ˈd͡ʑvʲiɲat͡ʂ ˈdɔlnɨ]) is a village in the administrative district of Gmina Ustrzyki Dolne, within Bieszczady County, Subcarpathian Voivodeship, in south-eastern Poland.
