= Grąziowa =

- Village
- Location within Poland
- Coordinates: 49°37′N 22°33′E
- Country: Poland
- Voivodeship: Subcarpathian
- County: Bieszczady
- Gmina: Ustrzyki Dolne
- Population: 22

Grąziowa [ɡrɔ̃ˈʑɔva] is a village in the administrative district of Gmina Ustrzyki Dolne, within Bieszczady County, Subcarpathian Voivodeship, in south-eastern Poland.
