= Bóbrka, Lesko County =

Bóbrka
- Village
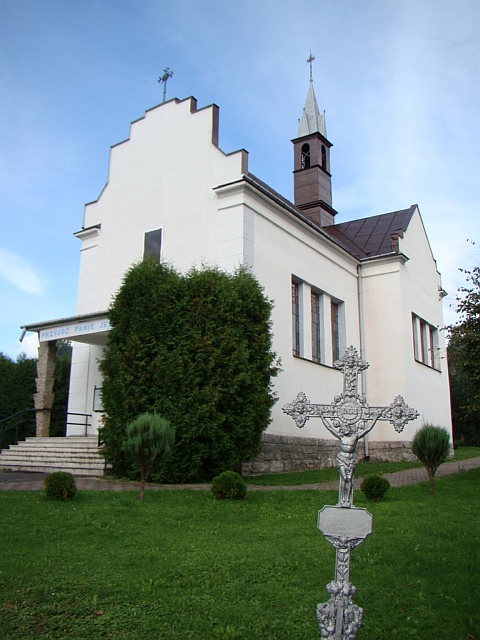
- Church of the Heart of Jesus

- Location within Poland
- Coordinates: 49°25′1″N 22°26′56″E
- Country: Poland
- Voivodeship: Subcarpathian
- County: Lesko
- Gmina: Solina

Population
  - Total: 510

Bóbrka [ˈbubrka] is a village in the administrative district of Gmina Solina, within Lesko County, Subcarpathian Voivodeship, in south-eastern Poland.
