= Jamna Górna =

- Village
- Location within Poland
- Coordinates: 49°36′N 22°37′E
- Country: Poland
- Voivodeship: Subcarpathian
- County: Bieszczady
- Gmina: Ustrzyki Dolne

Jamna Górna [ˈjamna ˈɡurna] was a village in the administrative district of Gmina Ustrzyki Dolne, within Bieszczady County, Subcarpathian Voivodeship, in south-eastern Poland. Its geographical location lays approximately 19 km (12 mi) north of Ustrzyki Dolne and 66 km (41 mi) south-east of the regional capital Rzeszów.
