= Moczary, Bieszczady County =

Moczary
- Village
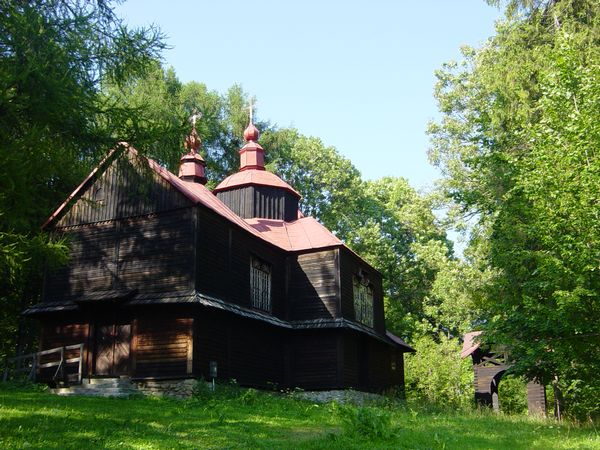
- Formerly Greek Catholic, currently Roman Catholic church

- Location within Poland
- Coordinates: 49°23′15″N 22°40′35″E
- Country: Poland
- Voivodeship: Subcarpathian
- County: Bieszczady
- Gmina: Ustrzyki Dolne
- Population: 300

Moczary [mɔˈt͡ʂarɨ] is a village in the administrative district of Gmina Ustrzyki Dolne, within Bieszczady County, Subcarpathian Voivodeship, in south-eastern Poland, near the border with Ukraine.
