= Łobozew Górny =

- Village
- Location within Poland
- Coordinates: 49°23′N 22°31′E
- Country: Poland
- Voivodeship: Subcarpathian
- County: Bieszczady
- Gmina: Ustrzyki Dolne

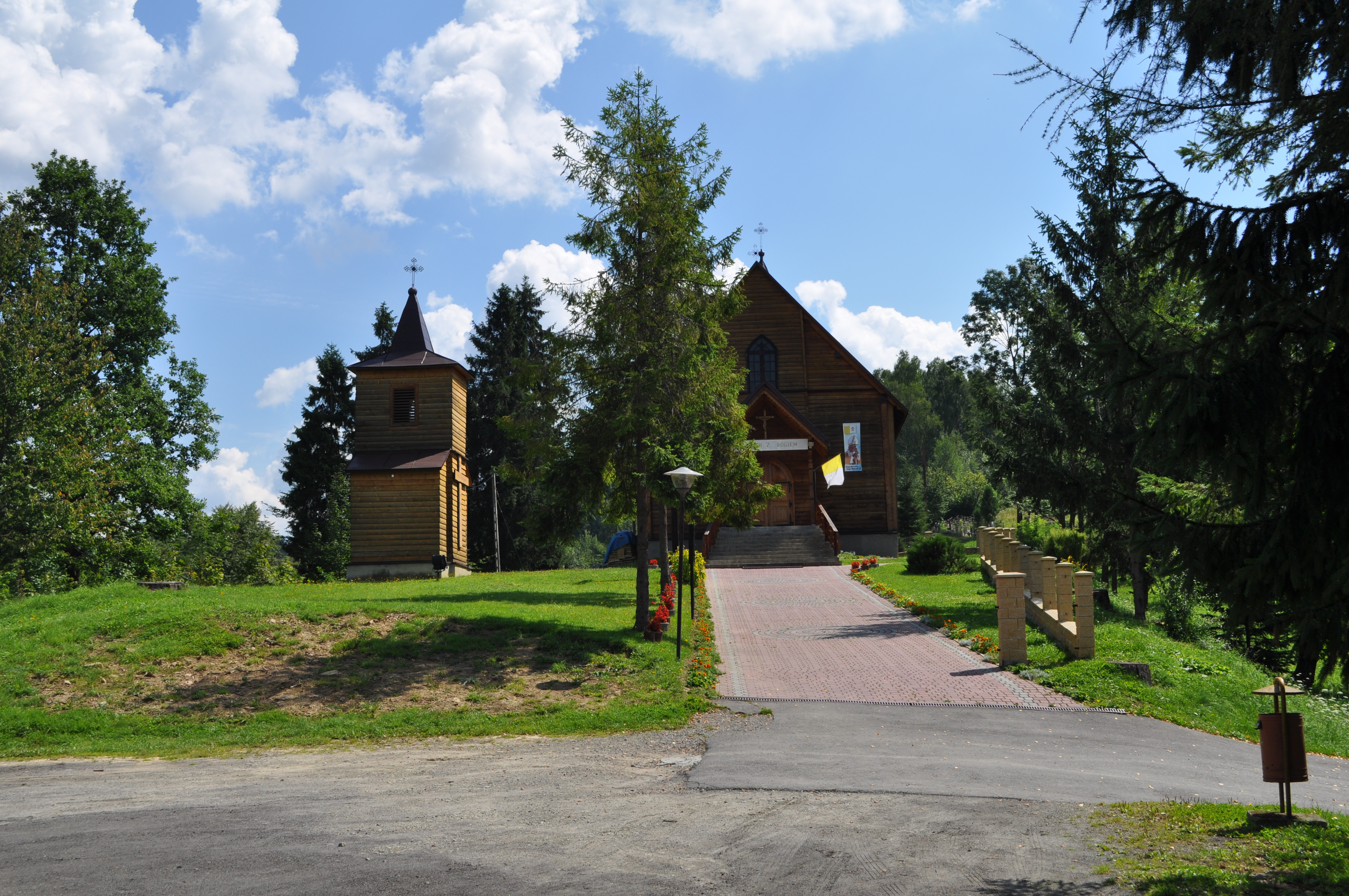
Church in Łobozew Górny

Łobozew Górny [wɔˈbɔzɛf ˈɡurnɨ] is a village in the administrative district of Gmina Ustrzyki Dolne, within Bieszczady County, Subcarpathian Voivodeship, in south-eastern Poland.
