= Krościenko, Bieszczady County =

Krościenko
- Village
- Interactive map of Krościenko
- Location within Poland
- Coordinates: 49°28′N 22°40′E
- Country: Poland
- Voivodeship: Subcarpathian
- County: Bieszczady
- Gmina: Ustrzyki Dolne
- Population: 590
- Time zone: UTC+1 (CET)
  - Summer (DST): UTC+2 (CEST)
- Vehicle registration: RBI

Krościenko [krɔɕˈt͡ɕɛŋkɔ] is a village in the administrative district of Gmina Ustrzyki Dolne, within Bieszczady County, Subcarpathian Voivodeship, in south-eastern Poland, near the border with Ukraine.

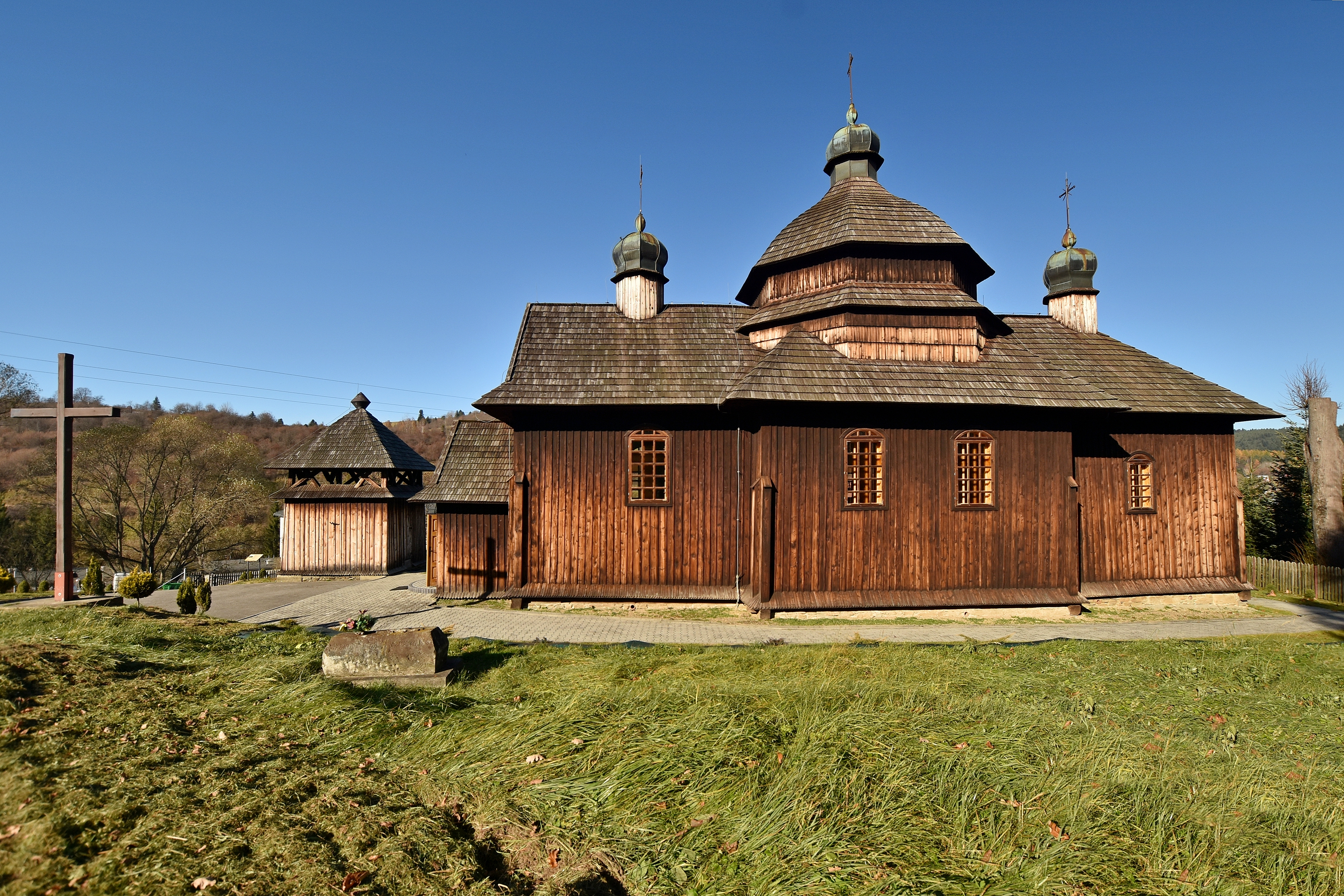
Historic church
