= Łobozew Dolny =

- Village
- Location within Poland
- Coordinates: 49°24′N 22°29′E
- Country: Poland
- Voivodeship: Subcarpathian
- County: Bieszczady
- Gmina: Ustrzyki Dolne

Łobozew Dolny [wɔˈbɔzɛf ˈdɔlnɨ] is a village in the administrative district of Gmina Ustrzyki Dolne, within Bieszczady County, Subcarpathian Voivodeship, in south-eastern Poland. Nearby to the south is the 741-metre Jawor mountain peak.
