= Boykos =

Ethnic group

бойки
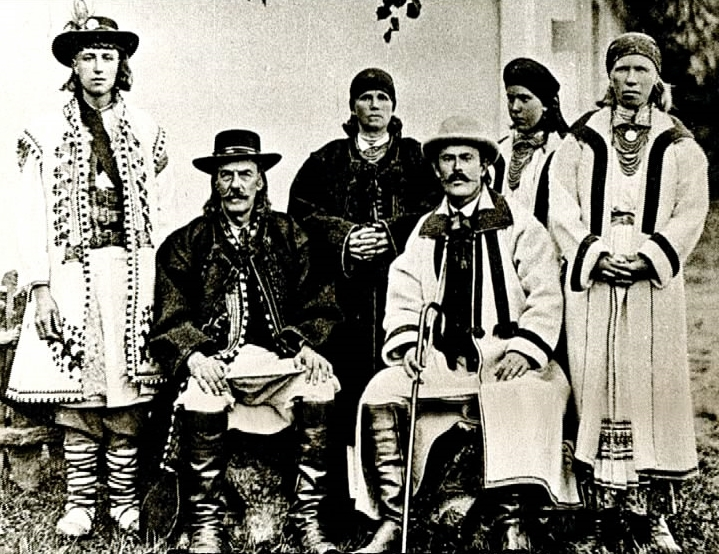
- Boyko family of Maniava, late 19th century

Regions with significant populations
- Ukraine: 131 (2001)
- Poland: 258 (2011)

Languages
- Boyko dialect of Rusyn or Ukrainian language Slovak

Religion
- Eastern Catholic, Orthodox Christianity

Related ethnic groups
- Lemkos · Hutsuls

The Boykos or Boikos (Rusyn: бойки; Ukrainian: бойки, romanized: boiky; Polish: Bojkowie; Slovak: Pujďáci), or simply Highlanders (Ukrainian: верховинці, romanized: verkhovyntsi; Rusyn: ґоралы, romanized: goraly), are an ethnolinguistic group located in the Carpathian Mountains of Ukraine, Slovakia, Hungary, and Poland. Along with the neighbouring Lemkos and Hutsuls, the Boykos are considered a sub-group of Rusyns and speak a distinct East Slavic dialect. Within Ukraine, the Boykos and other Rusyns are seen as a sub-group of ethnic Ukrainians. Boykos differ from their neighbors in dialect, dress, folk architecture, and customs.

== Etymology ==
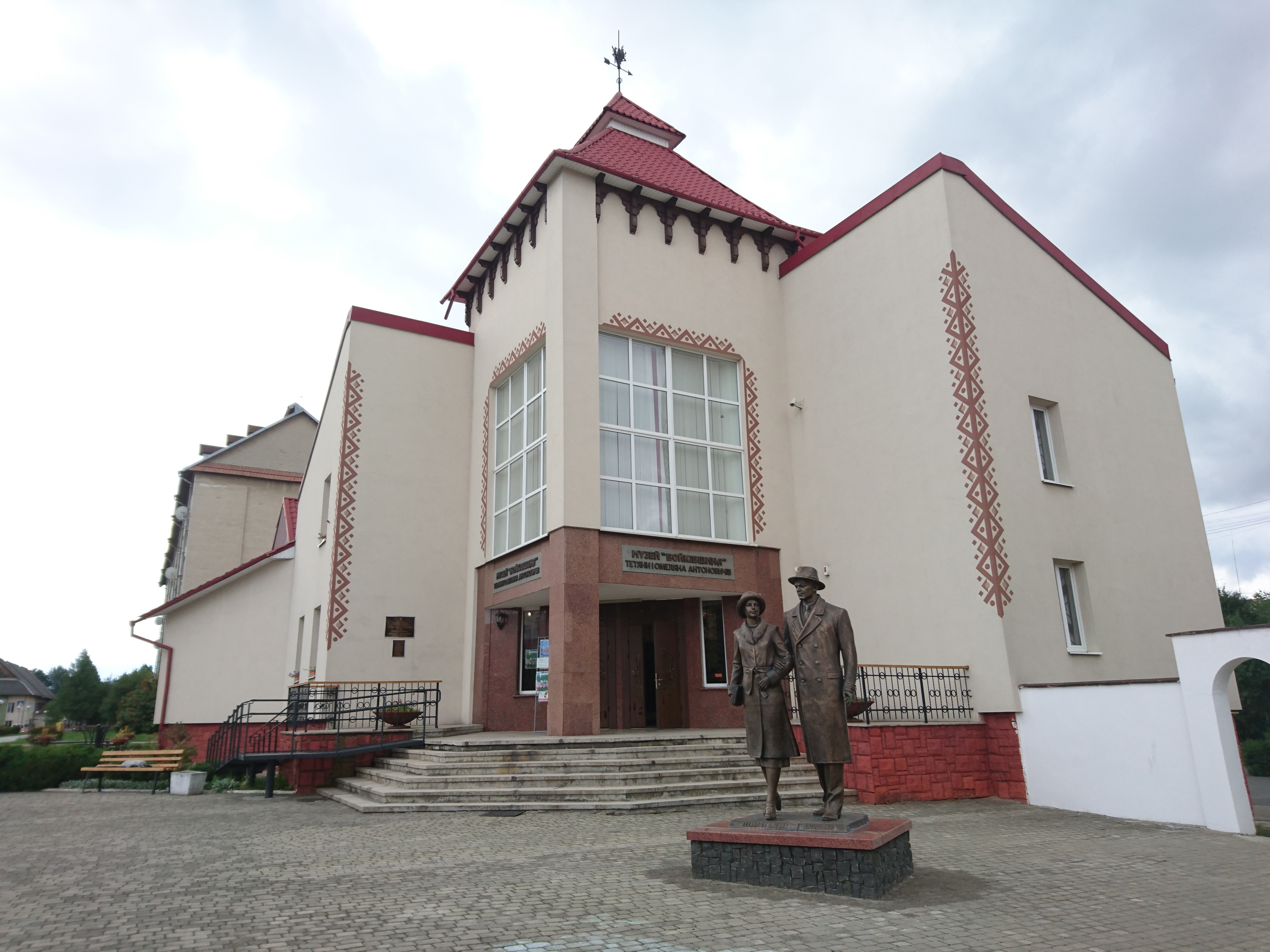
Museum of Boyko Culture, Dolyna

Regarding the origin of the name Boyko there exist several etymological hypotheses, but it is generally considered, as explained by priest Joseph Levytsky in his Hramatyka (1831), that it derives from the particle boiie. Specifically, it derives from the exclamation "бой!, бойє!" (< bo-i-je >), meaning "it is really so!", which is often used by the population. The 19th-century scholar Pavel Jozef Šafárik, with whom Franjo Rački and Henry Hoyle Howorth agreed, argued a direct connection of the Boykos with the region of Boiki mentioned in the 10th century De Administrando Imperio, but this thesis is outdated and rejected, as most scholars, Mykhailo Hrushevsky among them, already dismissed it in the 19th century because Boiki is a clear reference to Bohemia, which in turn derives from the Celtic tribe of Boii. The derivation from Boii, is also disputed because there is not enough evidence. They are also called Vrchovints (Highlanders). As in the case of Hutsuls and Lemkos, they are recorded in historical and ethnographic sources since the 18th and 19th century.

Some people otherwise identifiable as Boykos regard that name as derogatory and call themselves highlanders (verkhovyntsi).

== Origin ==
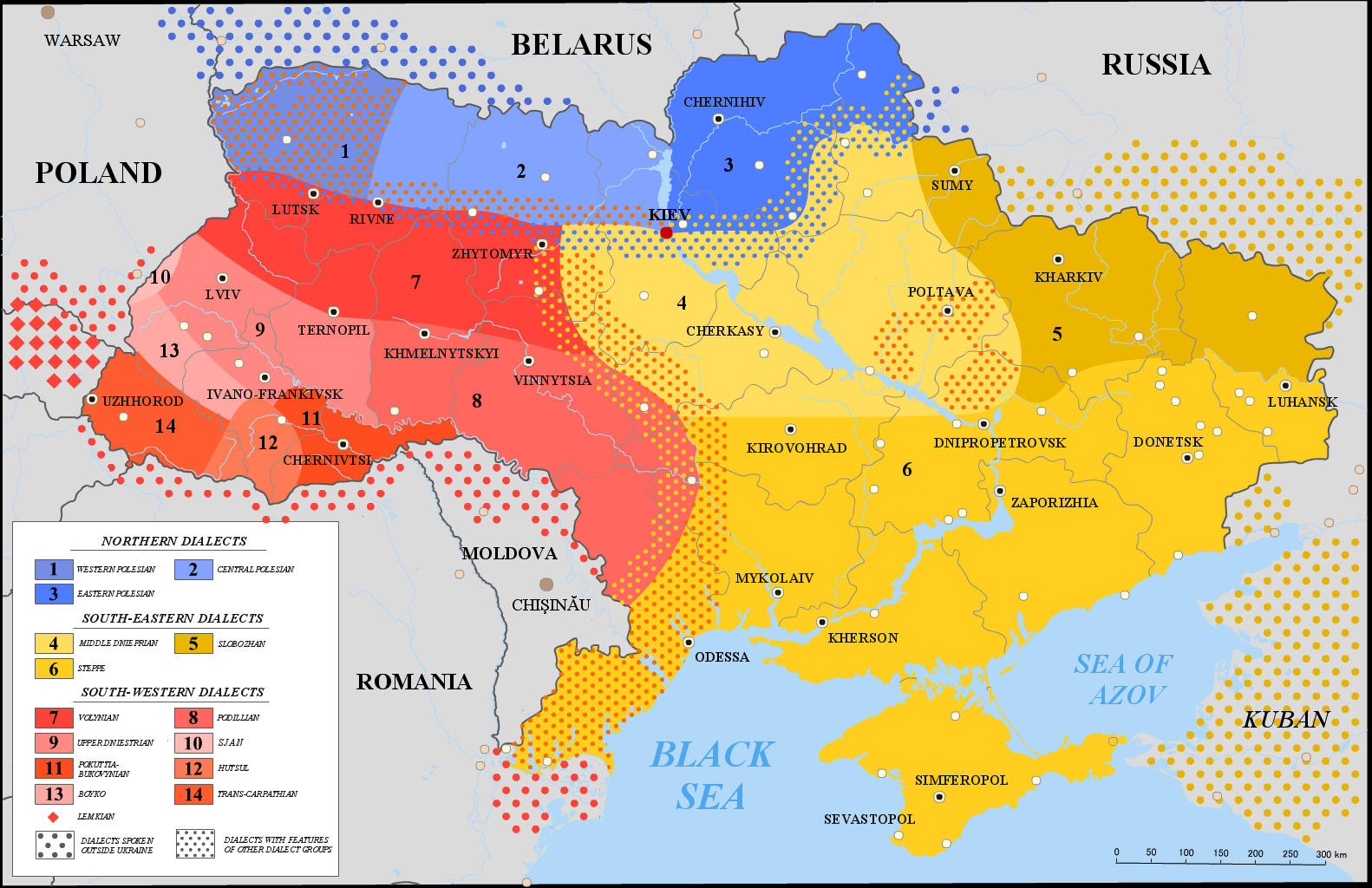
Map of Ukrainian dialects (2005). Boyko dialect (13)

Boykos are either considered one of the descendants of East Slavic tribes, specifically White Croats who lived in the region, possibly also Ulichs who arrived from the East, or Vlach shepherds who later immigrated from Transylvania.

== Demography ==
In the Boyko Region (Polish: Bojkowszczyzna, Boyko and Ukrainian: Бойківщина, romanized: Boikivshchyna), there lived up to 400,000 people of whom most were Boykos. They also lived in Sanok, Lesko and Przemyśl County of the Podkarpackie Voivodeship in Poland, before the Population exchange between Poland and Soviet Ukraine and the forced relocation of Rusyns and Ukrainians in Poland in 1947. In commemoration of Boykos, Ukraine's national parliament, the Verkhovna Rada, in 2016 renamed Telmanove Raion into Boykivske Raion where Boykos were deported from Czarna, Bieszczady County (today in Poland) after the 1951 Polish–Soviet territorial exchange. It is estimated from the evidence available that in 1970 there lived 230,000 people of Boyko origin.

In Ukraine, the classification of Boykos as an ethnicity distinct from Ukrainians is controversial. The deprecated and archaic term Ruthenian, while also derived from Rus', is ambiguous, as it technically may refer to Rusyns and Ukrainians, as well as Belarusians and in some cases Russians, depending on the historical period. According to the 2001 Ukraine census, only 131 people identified themselves as Boykos, separate from Ukrainians. This is also on top of many attempts within the USSR and modern day Ukraine to assimilate the Rusyn people into the modern Ukraine state. In the Polish census of 2011, 258 people stated Boyko as a national-ethnic identity, with 14 of those people listing it as their only national-ethnic identity.

== Location ==
- Poland: southeasternmost part of Poland (Podkarpackie Voivodeship).
- Ukraine: central and western half of the Carpathians in Ukraine across such regions as the southern Lviv Oblast (Stryi, Drohobych, and Sambir raions), western Ivano-Frankivsk Oblast (Kalush Raion) and parts of the northeastern Zakarpattia Oblast (former Mizhhiria Raion)
- Northeast Slovakia

To the west of Boykos live Lemkos, east or southeast Hutsuls, northward Dnistrovyans, Opolyans.

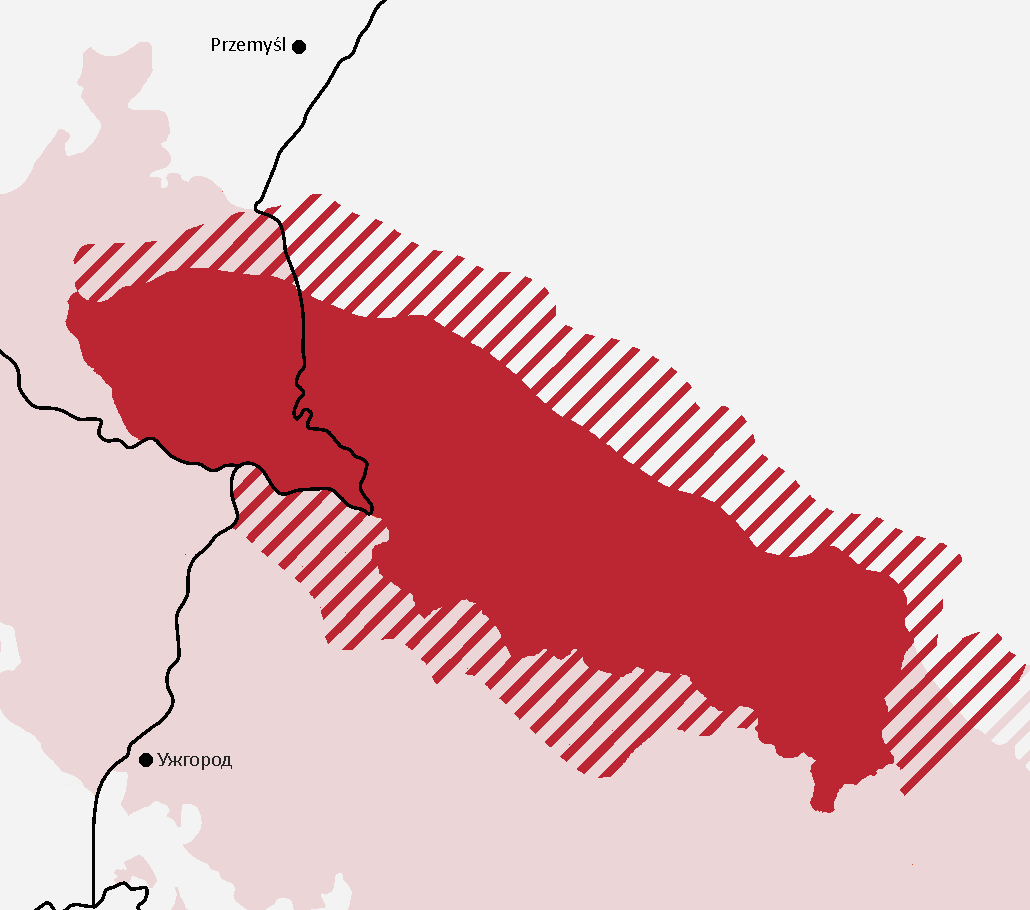
Areas of Boyko settlement on the border of Ukraine (right) and Poland (left)

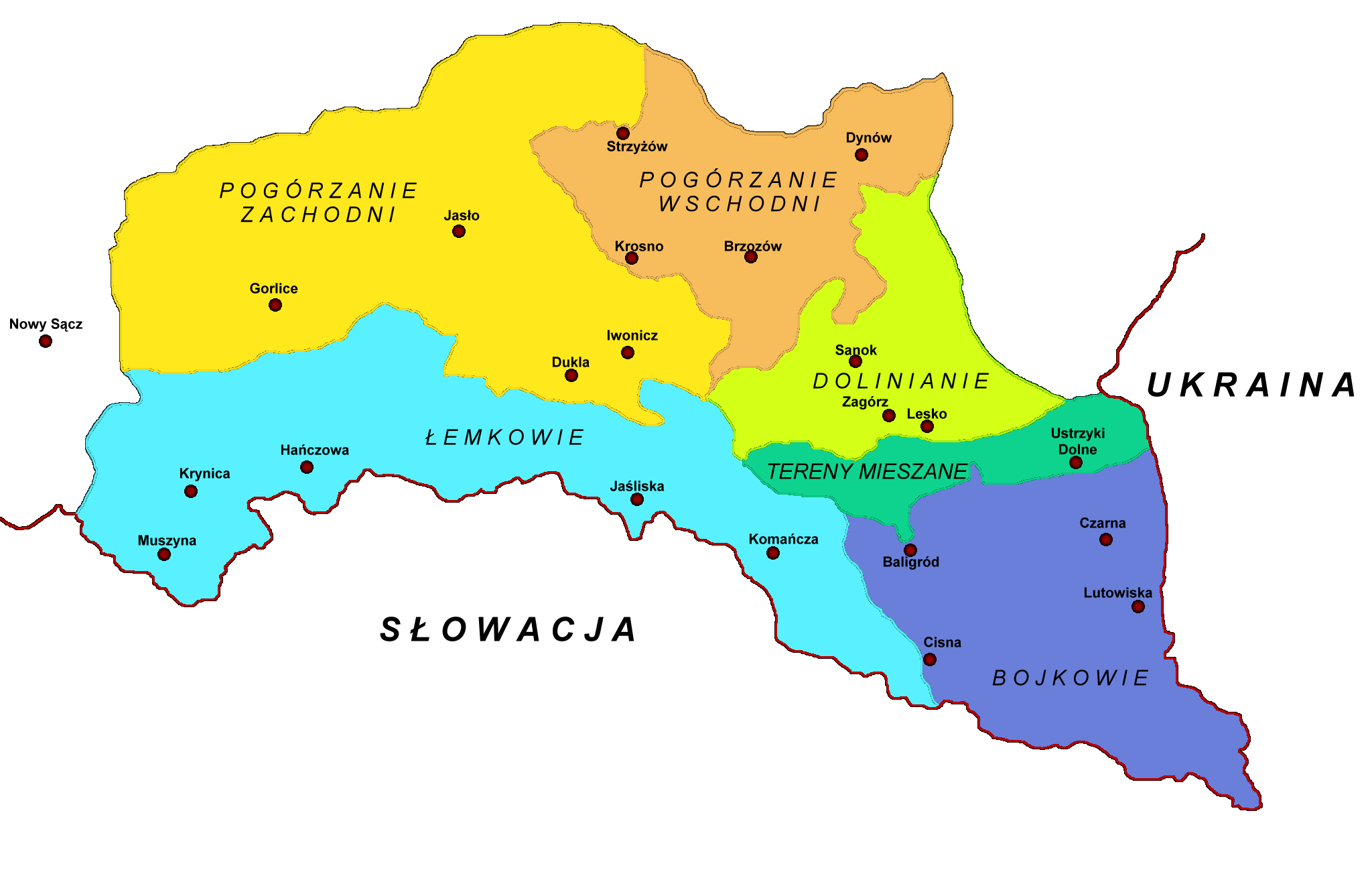
Ethnographic groups of southeasternmost Poland, Boykos in dark blue.

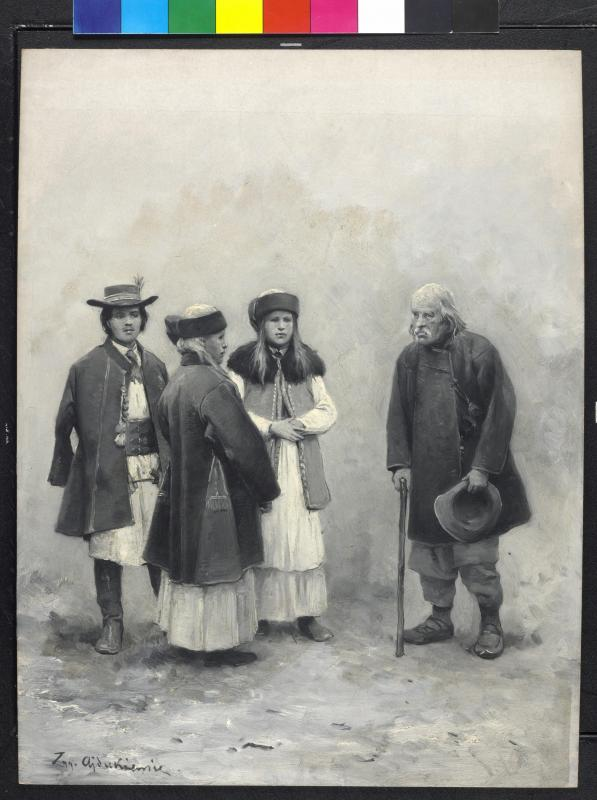
Boyko family. Dolyna district. 1898

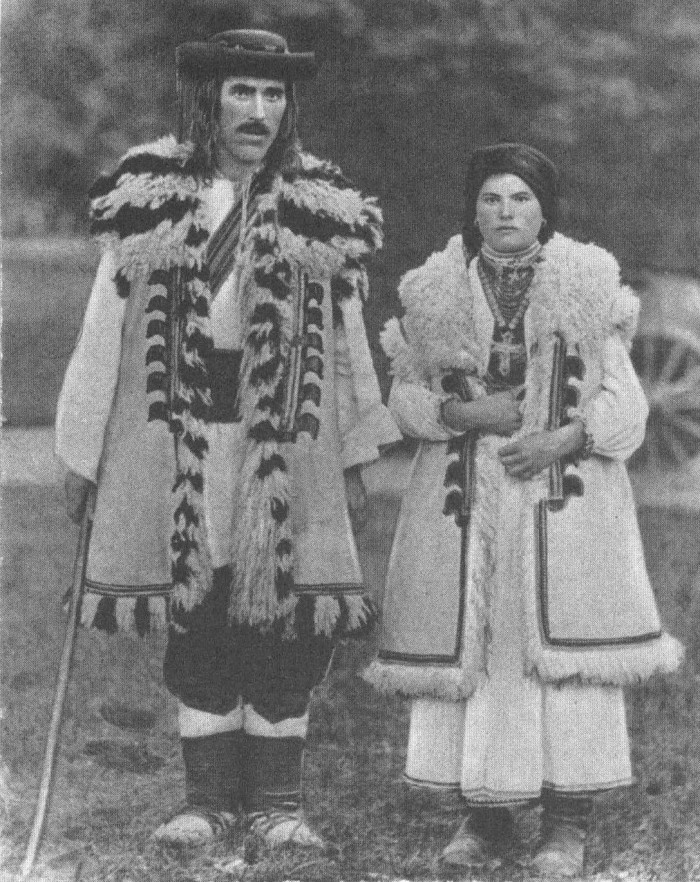
Boyko family. Beginning of the XX century

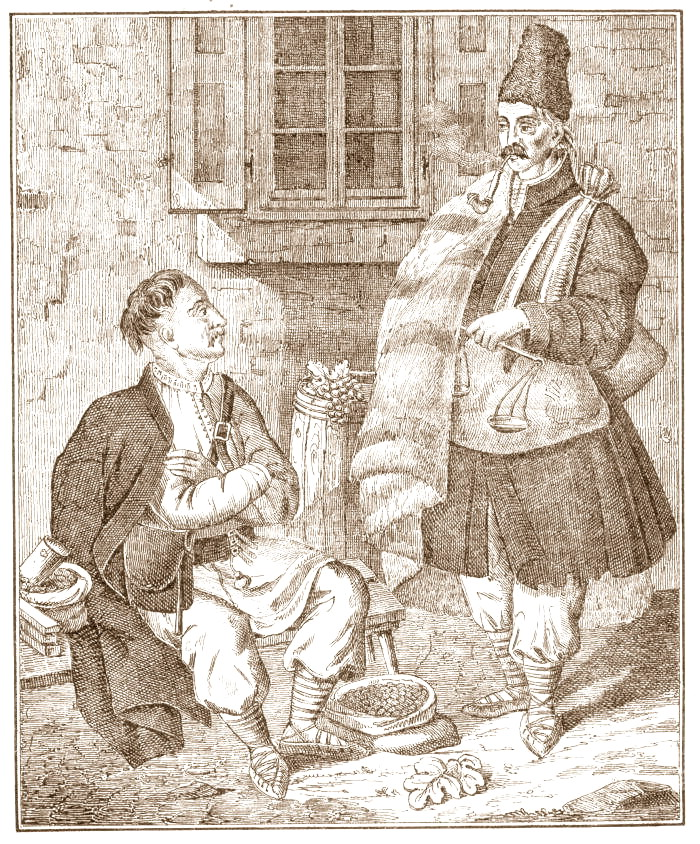
Boyko inhabitants of Galicia, lithograph from 1837

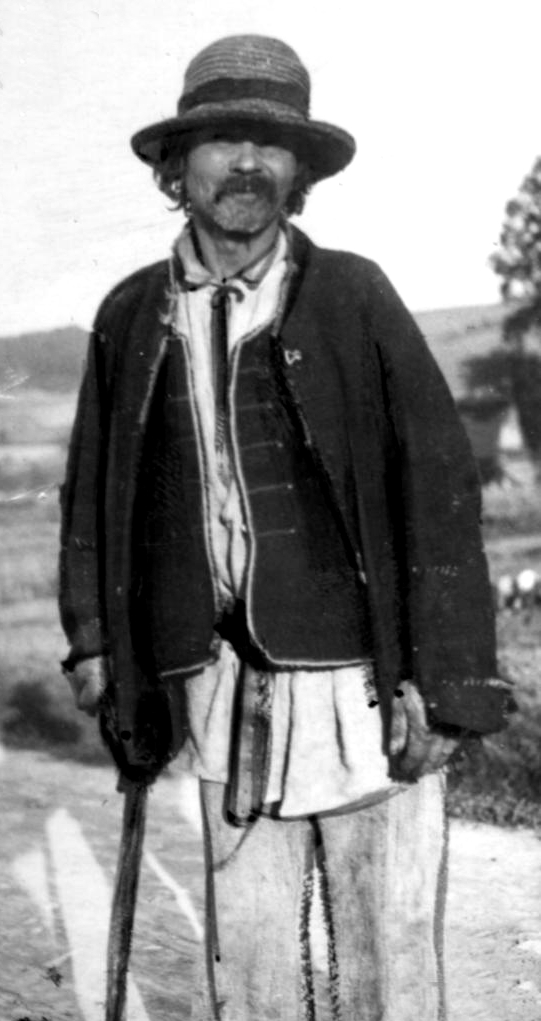
Boyko man, 1925–1939.

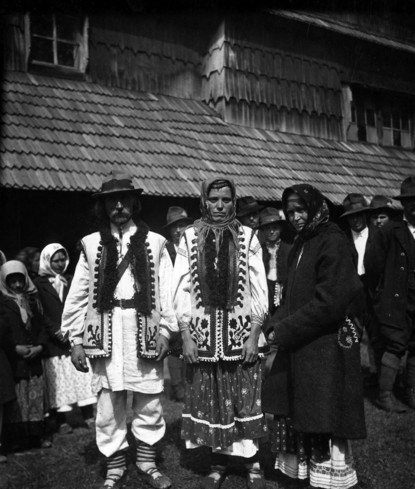
Boyko family, prewar.

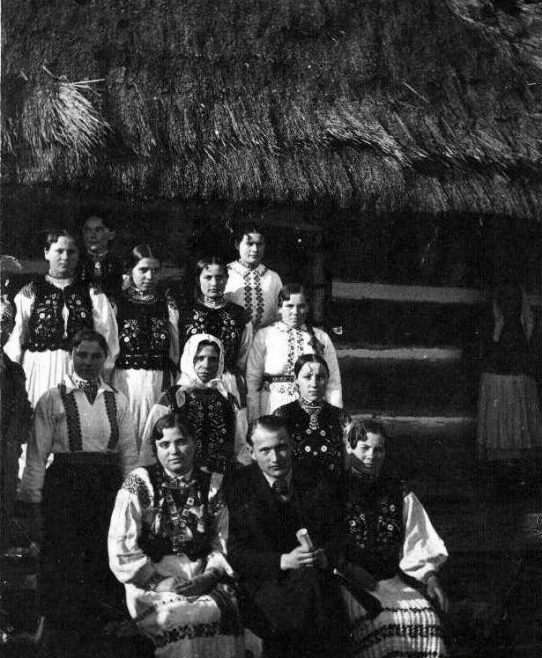
Boyko family, prewar.

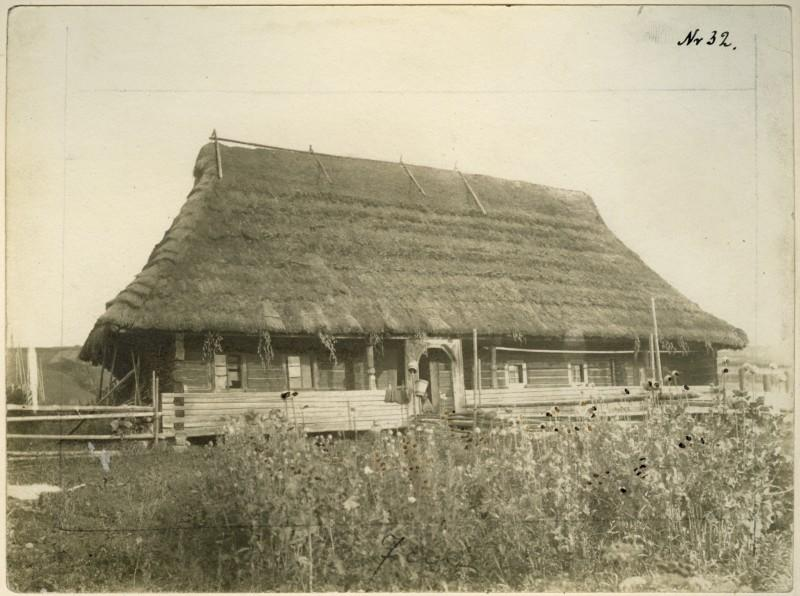
Boyko hut, 1903

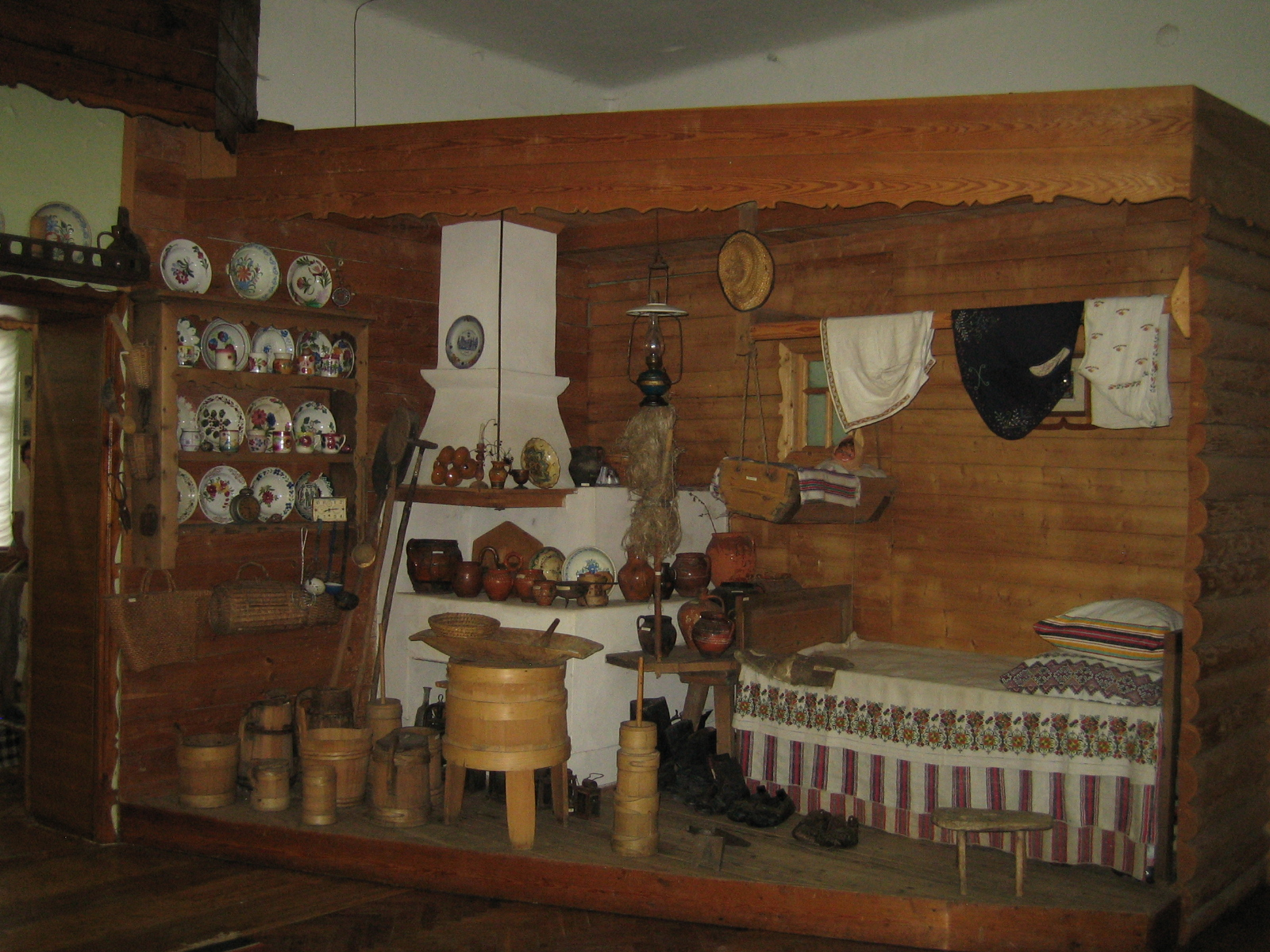
interior of the Boyko hut. Museum of Culture and Life of Boykivshchyna

== Religion ==
Most Boykos belong to the Ukrainian Greek Catholic Church, with a minority belonging to the Ukrainian Orthodox Church. The distinctive wooden church architecture of the Boyko region is a three-domed church, with the domes arranged in one line, and the middle dome slightly larger than the others.

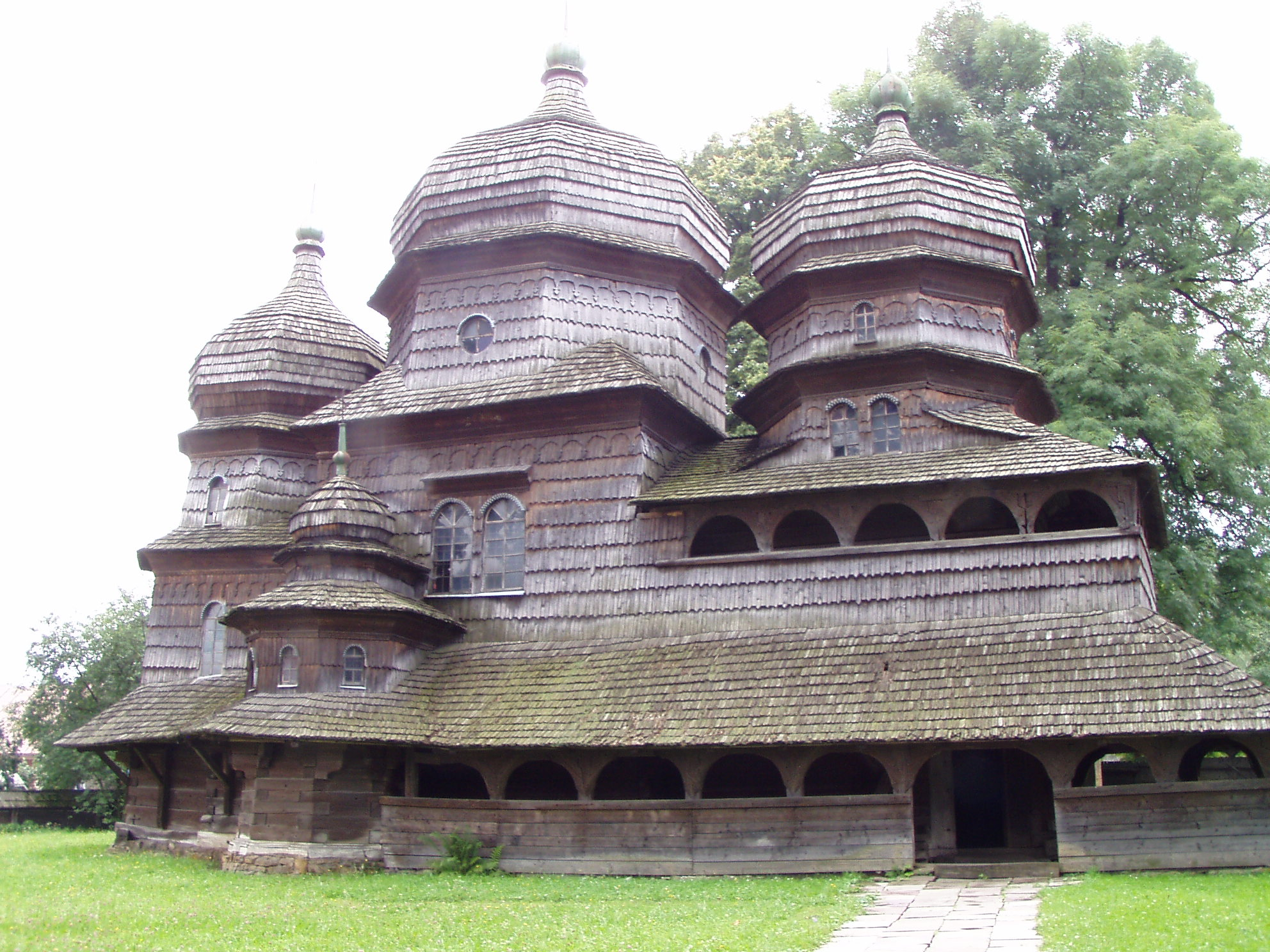
St. George's Church in Drohobych

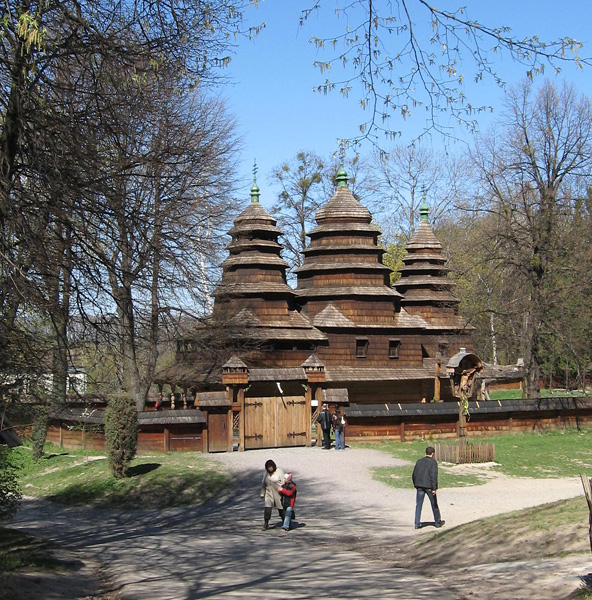
A traditional Boyko church in Lviv

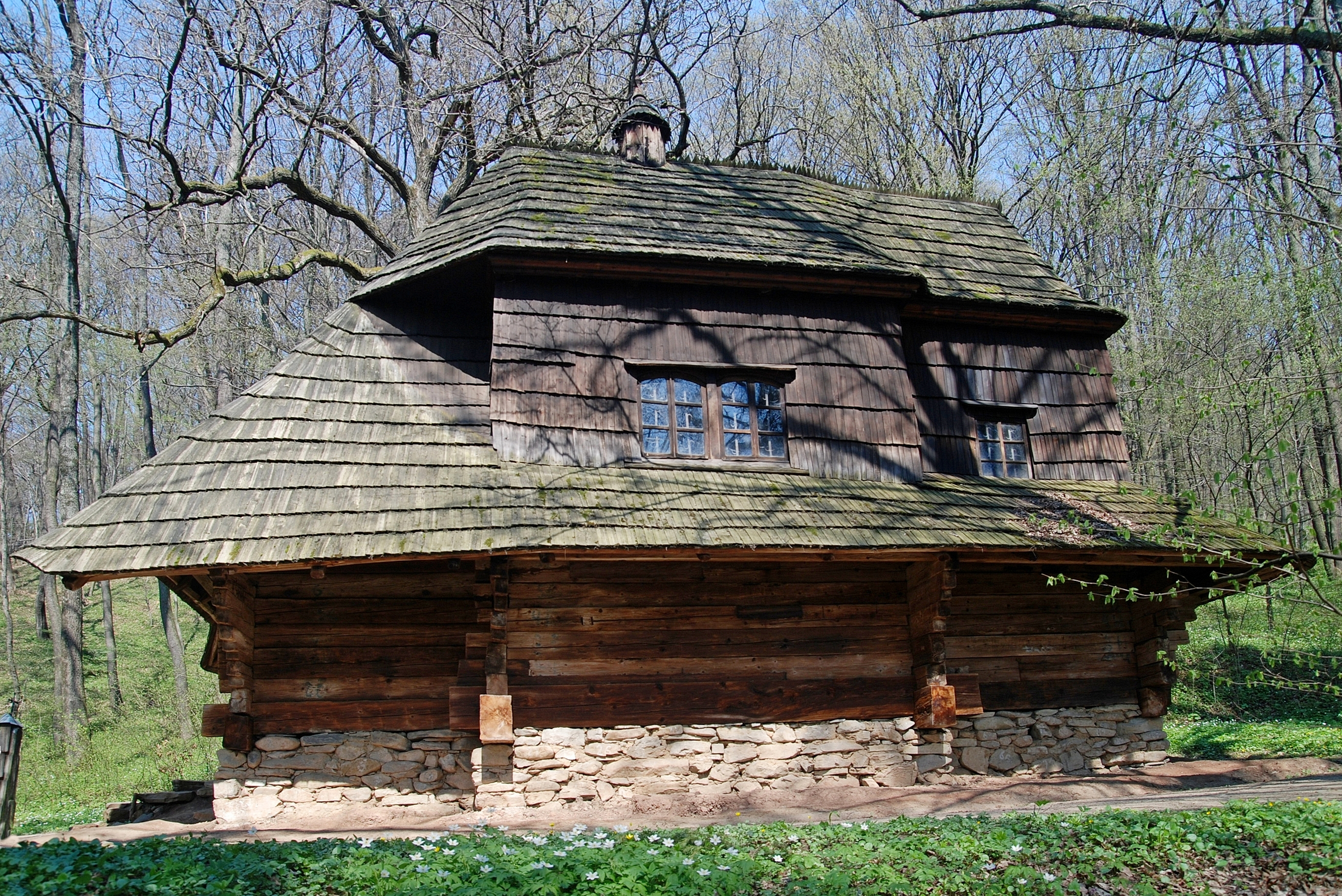
Wooden Church of St. Onuphrius in Rosolin

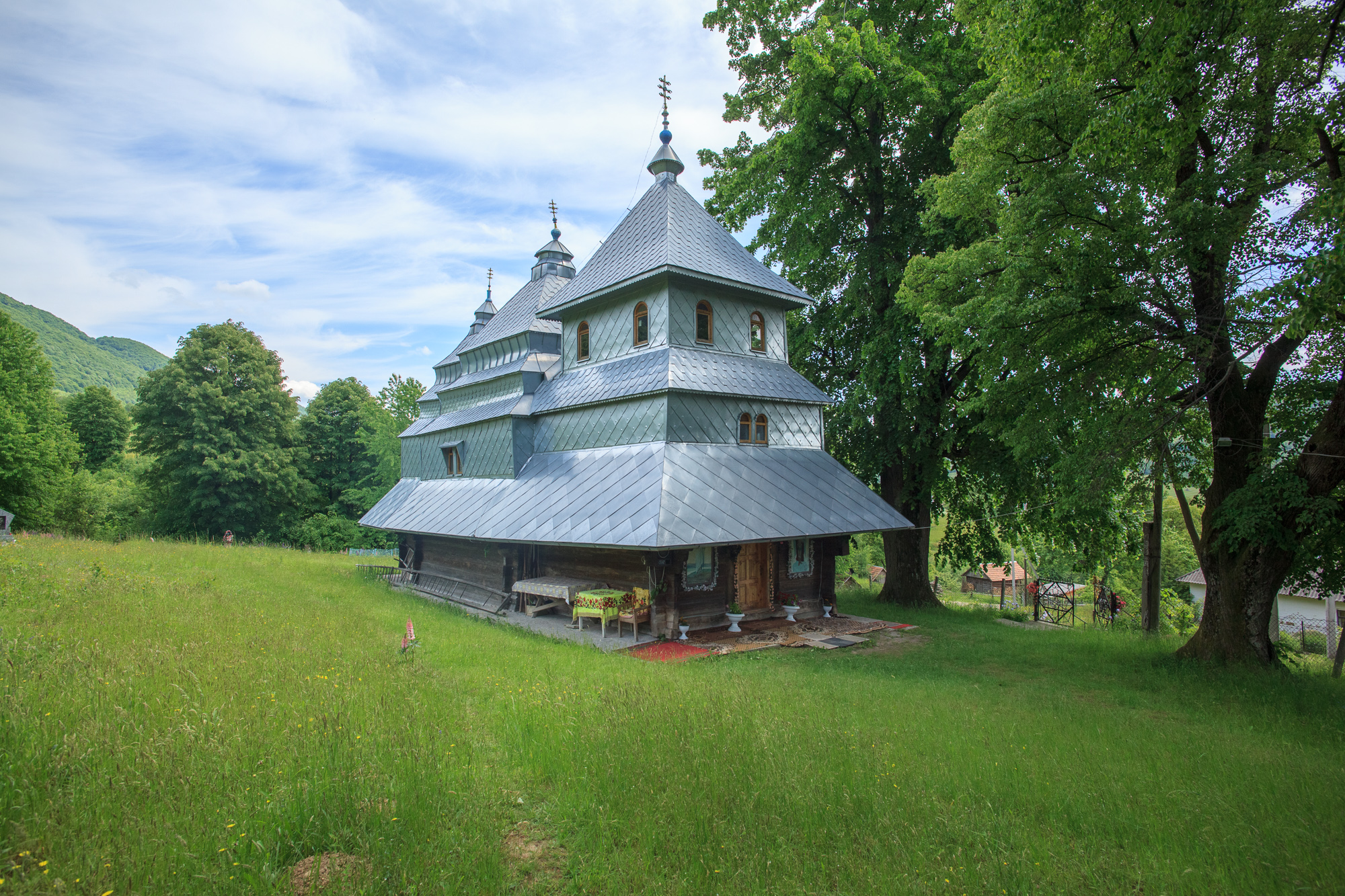
Church of Saint Michael in Vyshka

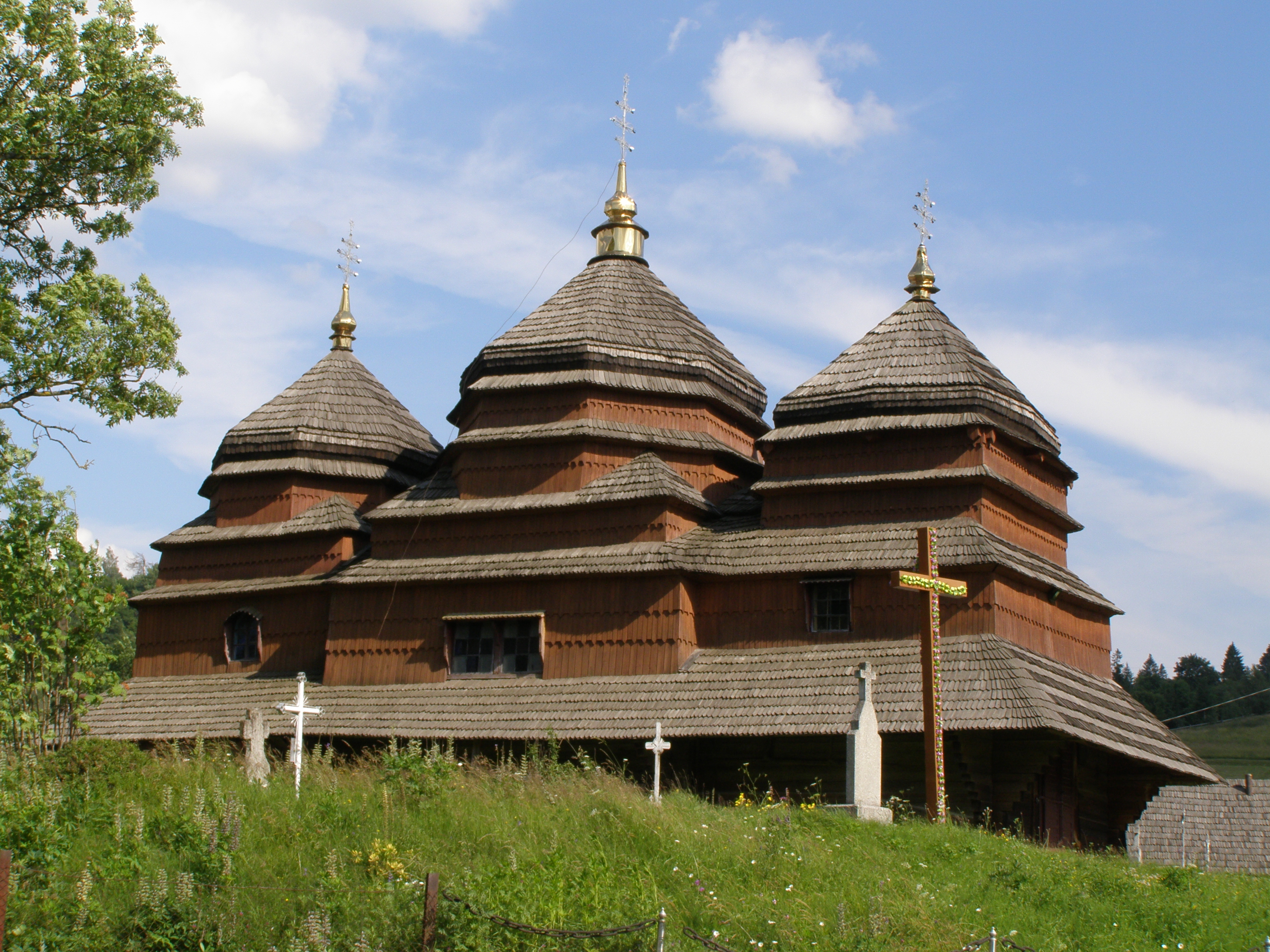
Church of the Pentecost in Verkhnia Rozhanka

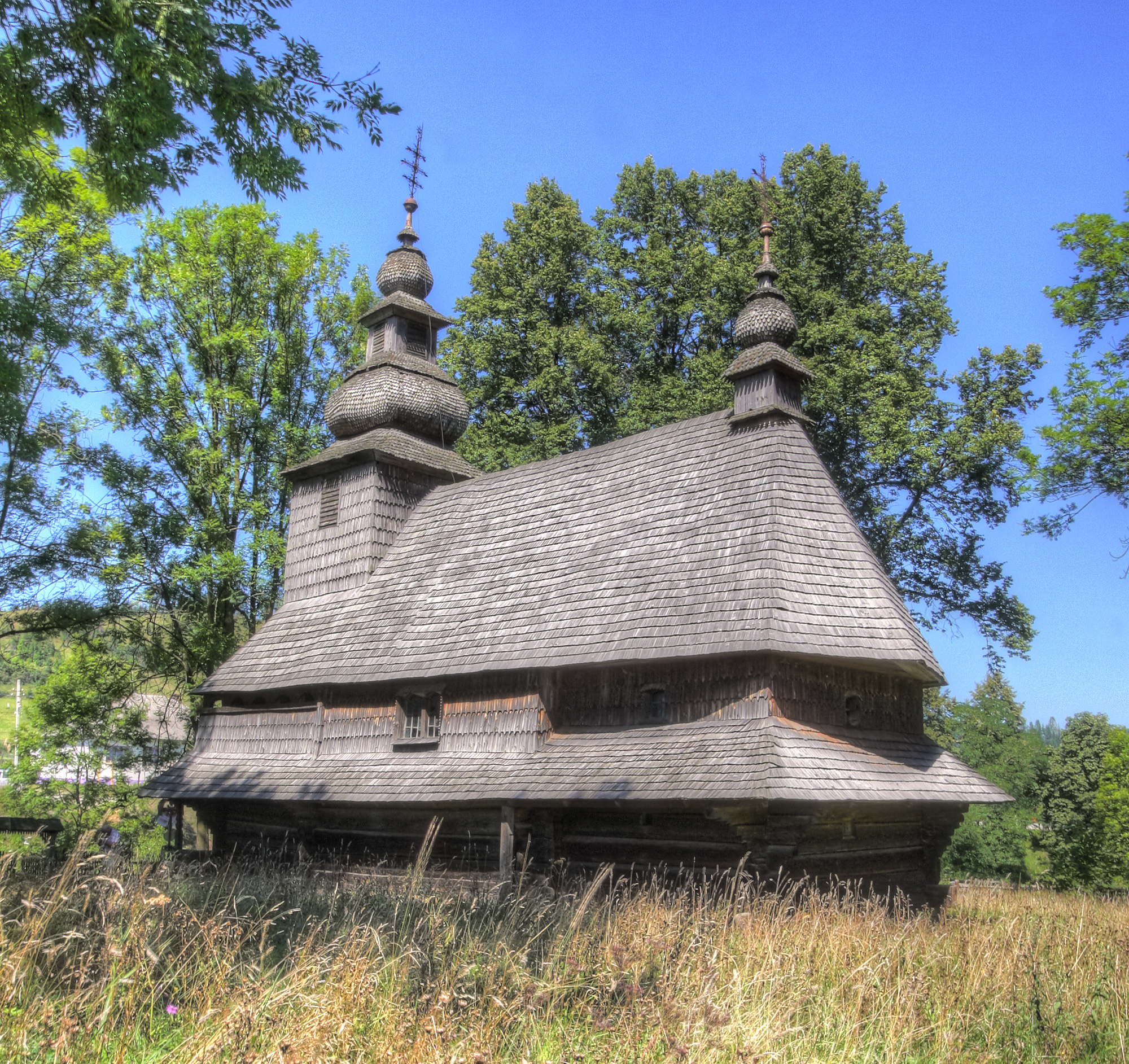
Holy Spirit Church in Huklyvyi

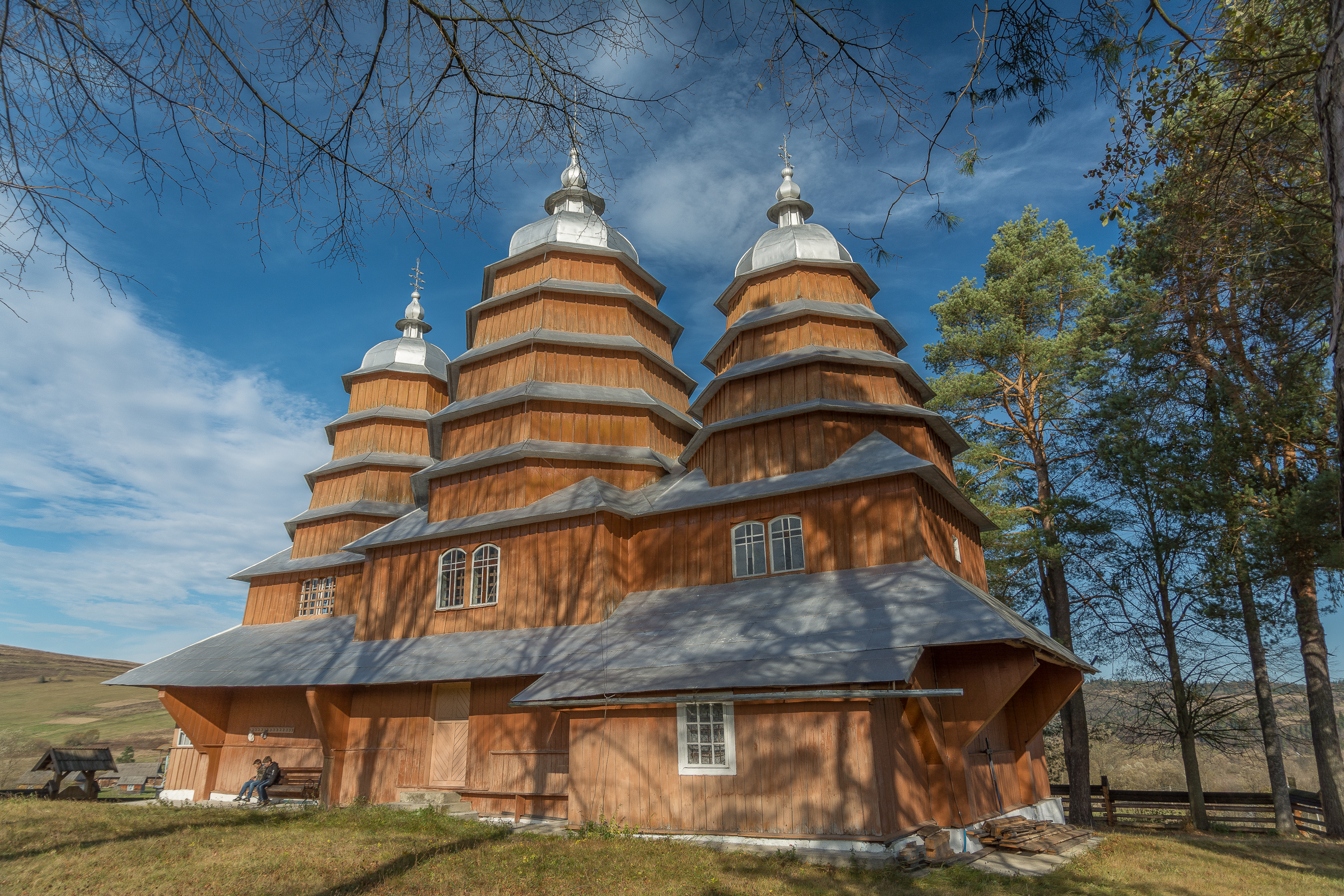
Saint Demetrius Church in Matkiv

== Notable people ==
- Yuriy Drohobych (1450–1494), first doctor of medicine in Ukraine, rector of the University of Bologna (1481–1482), professor at Jagiellonian University (1488).
- Petro Konashevych-Sahaidachny (1582–1622), Ukrainian political and civic leader, Hetman of Ukrainian Zaporozhian Cossacks (1616–1622).
- Ivan Franko (1856–1916), Ukrainian poet, writer and political activist.
- Oleksa Hirnyk (1912-1978), Ukrainian political activist and member of the Ukrainian Insurgent Army
- Halyna Pahutiak (born 1958), Ukrainian writer.

== See also ==
- Rusyns
- Ruthenians
- Ukrainians
- Boyko (name)
