= Wydrne =

- Village
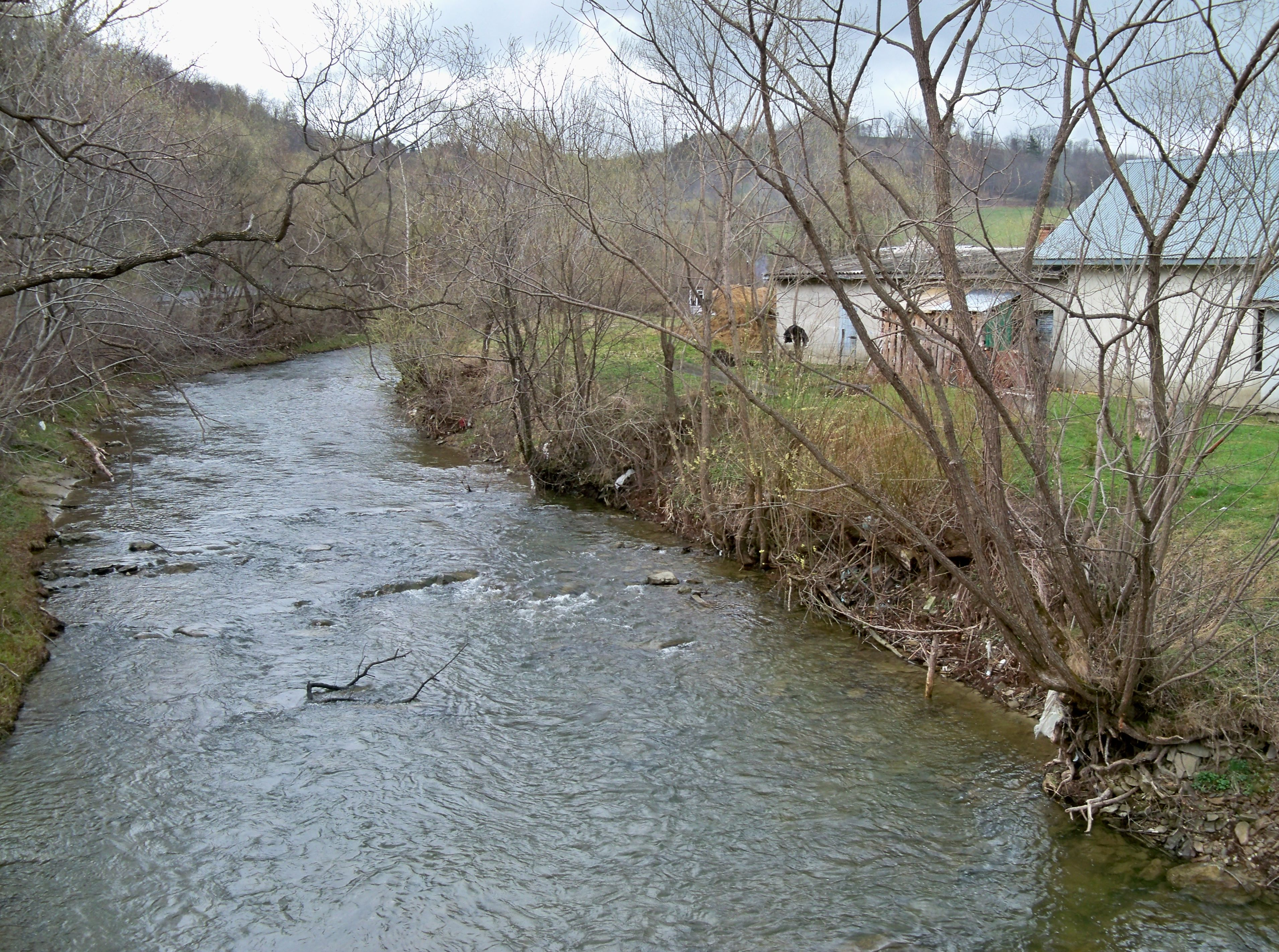

- Location within Poland
- Coordinates: 49°19′N 22°34′E
- Country: Poland
- Voivodeship: Subcarpathian
- County: Bieszczady
- Gmina: Czarna

Wydrne (pronounced [ˈvɨdrnɛ]) is a village in the administrative district of Gmina Czarna, within Bieszczady County, Subcarpathian Voivodeship, in south-eastern Poland, close to the border with Ukraine.
