= Polana, Podkarpackie Voivodeship =

Polana
- Village
- Location within Poland
- Coordinates: 49°18′10″N 22°34′59″E
- Country: Poland
- Voivodeship: Subcarpathian
- County: Bieszczady
- Gmina: Czarna

Polana [pɔˈlana] is a village in the administrative district of Gmina Czarna, within Bieszczady County, Subcarpathian Voivodeship, in south-eastern Poland, close to the border with Ukraine.
