= Lipie, Bieszczady County =

Lipie
- Village
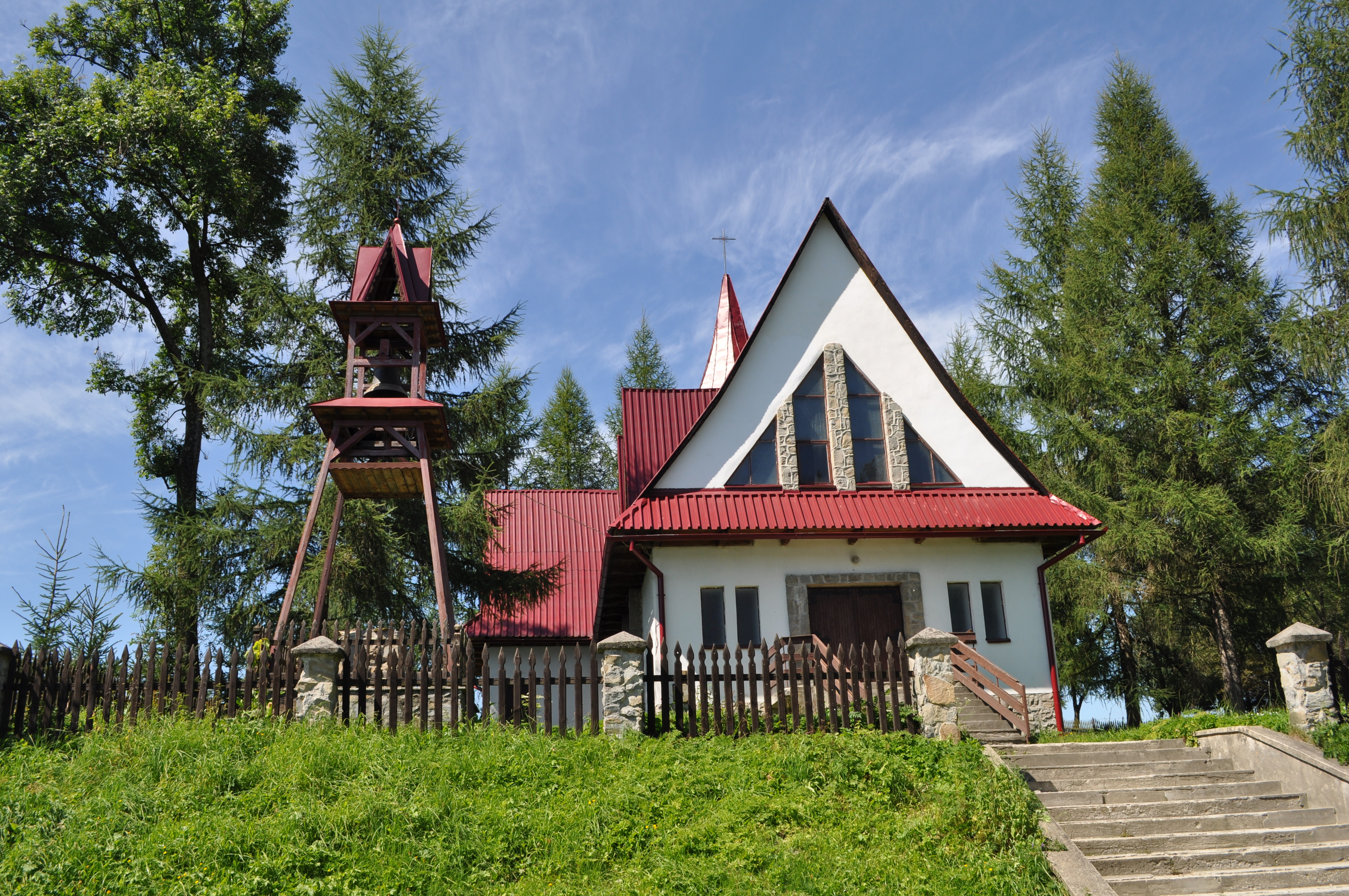
- Church in Lipie

- Location within Poland
- Coordinates: 49°18′18″N 22°42′3″E
- Country: Poland
- Voivodeship: Subcarpathian
- County: Bieszczady
- Gmina: Czarna
- Population: 200

Lipie [ˈlʲipʲɛ] is a village in the administrative district of Gmina Czarna, within Bieszczady County, Subcarpathian Voivodeship, in south-eastern Poland, close to the border with Ukraine.
