= San Valley Landscape Park =

Protected area in Poland

Coordinates: 49.1994°N 22.6447°E

- Park Krajobrazowy Doliny Sanu
- IUCN category V (protected landscape/seascape)
- Location: Subcarpathian Voivodeship
- Area: 342.70 km^{2} (132.32 sq mi)
- Established: 1992

San Valley Landscape Park (Park Krajobrazowy Doliny Sanu) is a protected area (Landscape Park) in south-eastern Poland, established in 1992, covering an area of 342.70 square kilometres (132.32 sq mi).

The Park lies within Podkarpackie Voivodeship: in Bieszczady County (Gmina Czarna, Gmina Lutowiska) and Lesko County (Gmina Solina).

Within the Landscape Park are three nature reserves.

In addition, several nature and landscape complexes were created here: "Wieś Krywe", "Village of Smolnik", "Cerkiew in Hulskie", "Młyn in Hulskie", "Cemetery in Stuposiany", "Cemetery in Ruskie", and in the vicinity of the Park also "Młyn in Dwernik".
