= Czarna Dolna =

- Village
- Location within Poland
- Coordinates: 49°19′47″N 22°38′13″E
- Country: Poland
- Voivodeship: Podkarpackie
- County: Bieszczady
- Gmina: Czarna
- Population: 420

Czarna Dolna [ˈt͡ʂarna ˈdɔlna] is a village in the administrative district of Gmina Czarna, within Bieszczady County, Subcarpathian Voivodeship, in south-eastern Poland, close to the border with Ukraine.

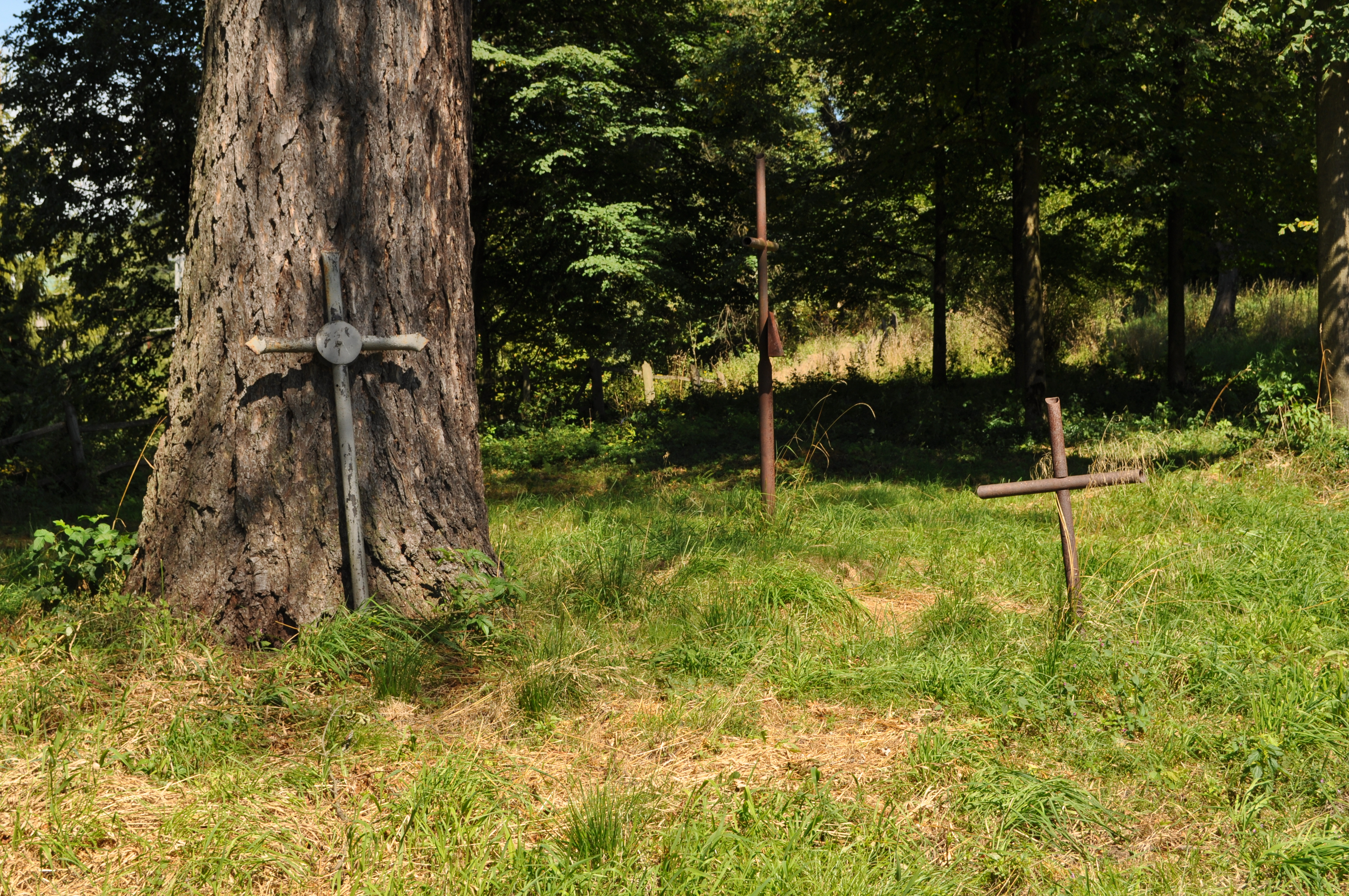
Old cemetery in Czarna Dolna
