= Bystre, Bieszczady County =

Bystre
- Village
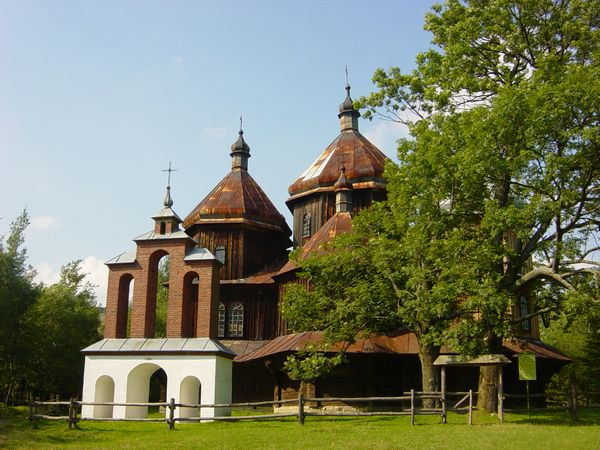
- Church of Saint Archangel Michael

- Location within Poland
- Coordinates: 49°19′N 22°44′E
- Country: Poland
- Voivodeship: Subcarpathian
- County: Bieszczady
- Gmina: Czarna
- Time zone: UTC+1 (CET)
  - Summer (DST): UTC+2 (CEST)

Bystre [ˈbɨstrɛ] is a village in the administrative district of Gmina Czarna, within Bieszczady County, Subcarpathian Voivodeship, in south-eastern Poland, close to the border with Ukraine.
