= Olchowiec, Bieszczady County =

Olchowiec
- Village
- Location within Poland
- Coordinates: 49°17′57″N 22°31′25″E
- Country: Poland
- Voivodeship: Subcarpathian
- County: Bieszczady
- Gmina: Czarna
- Population: 90

Olchowiec [ɔlˈxɔvʲɛt͡s] is a village in the administrative district of Gmina Czarna, within Bieszczady County, Subcarpathian Voivodeship, in south-eastern Poland, close to the border with Ukraine.
