= Rabe, Bieszczady County =

Rabe
- Village
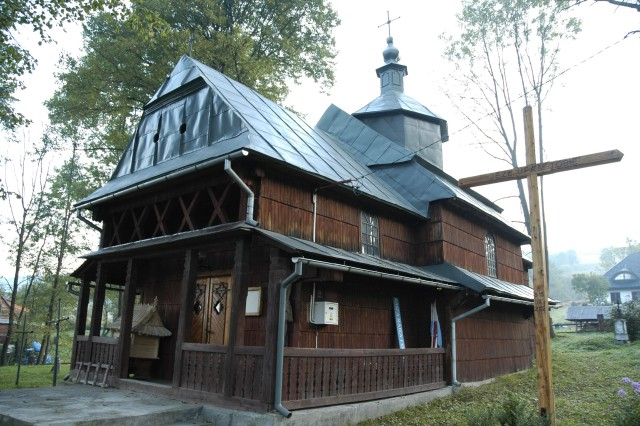
- Formerly Greek Catholic, currently Roman Catholic church

- Location within Poland
- Coordinates: 49°21′48″N 22°39′51″E
- Country: Poland
- Voivodeship: Subcarpathian
- County: Bieszczady
- Gmina: Czarna

Rabe [ˈrabɛ] is a village in the administrative district of Gmina Czarna, within Bieszczady County, Subcarpathian Voivodeship, in south-eastern Poland, close to the border with Ukraine.
