= Muczne =

- Village
- Location within Poland
- Coordinates: 49°07′43″N 22°44′39″E
- Country: Poland
- Voivodeship: Subcarpathian
- Powiat: Bieszczady
- Gmina: Lutowiska
- Population (2006): 45
- Time zone: UTC+1 (CET)
  - Summer (DST): UTC+2 (CEST)
- Postal code: 38-713
- Area code: +48 13
- Car Plates: RBI

Muczne [ˈmut͡ʂnɛ] is a village in southeastern Poland in Subcarpathian Voivodeship, Bieszczady County, Gmina Lutowiska, near the border with Ukraine, in the valley of the Muczny stream.

In the former administrative division of Poland (1975-1998), Muczne was situated in Krosno Voivodeship.

Mucze was on the trail of forest railway lines that led to Wołosate and Trebowiec valleys and it ended with Sokoliki Górskie railway station. Before World War II, Muczne was part of Dźwiniacz Górny village. In 1944, troops of Ukrainian Insurgent Army raided the village and murdered 70 people of Polish nationality in the Muczne massacre. Eventually, after the war, the village was deserted with all houses burnt-out.

In the 1970s, there was a small dwelling for forest workers and, in 1975, the area was taken over by the Council of Ministers. Later, Muczne was turned into a farming estate and hunting ground owned by the state.

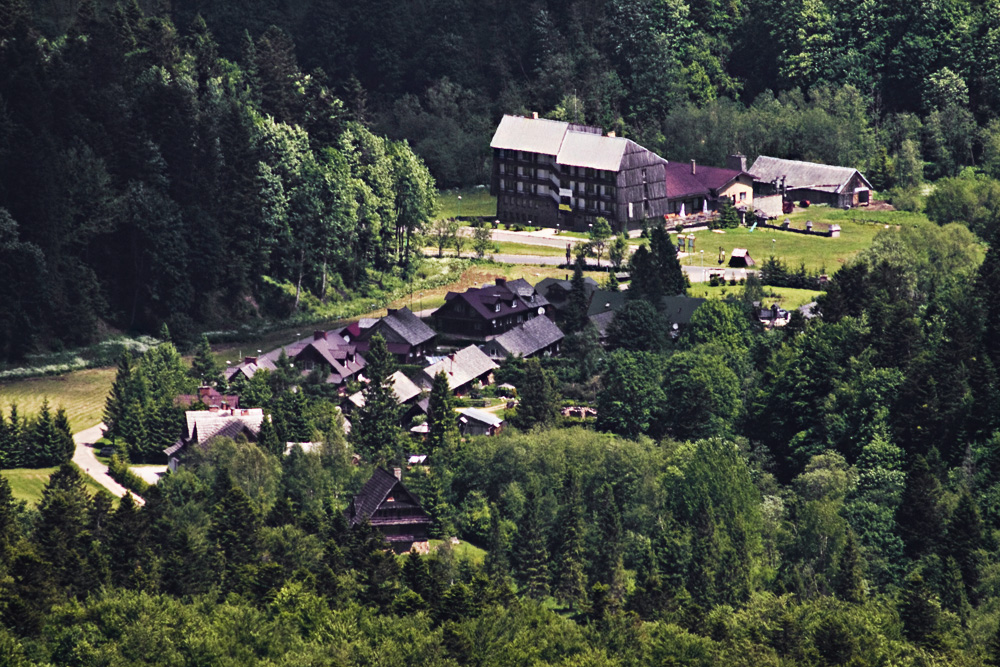

In the 1970s, Muczne was a secluded place where Polish Communist leaders could come to relax and often spend time and host their international VIPs. The former PM of Poland, Piotr Jaroszewicz, is said to have hunted a bear that is displayed in the Bieszczady National Park Museum. Among important guests in Muczne were: Edward Gierek, Josip Broz Tito, and Abdoreza Pahlavi. For several years, Muczne was called Kazimierzowo to honor colonel Kazimierz Doskoczyński who was the head of another state estate in Arłamów.
