= Chrewt =

- Village
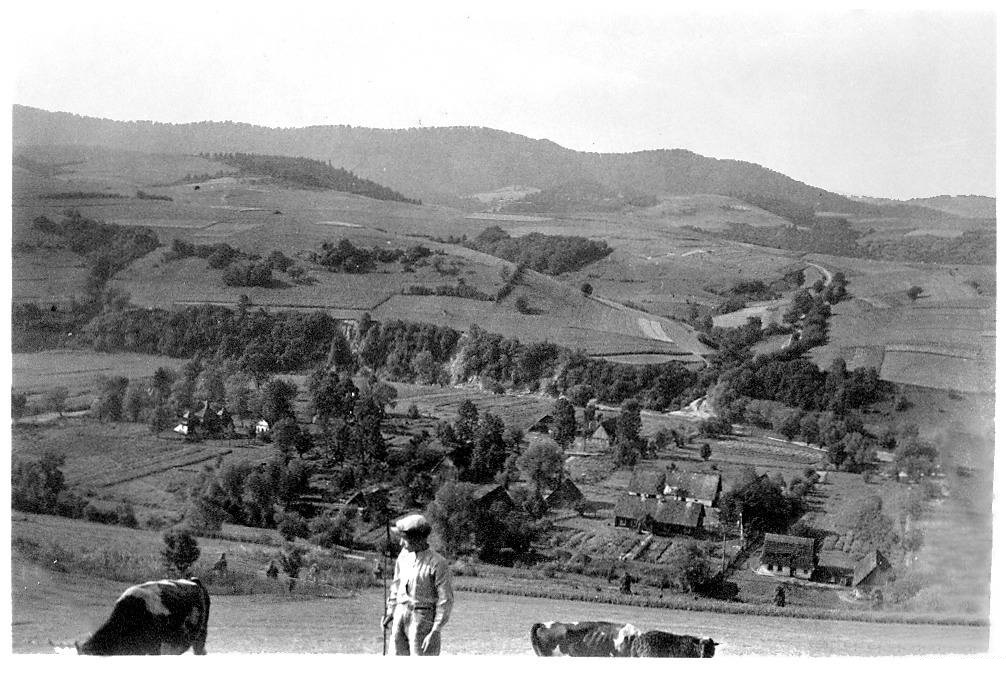

- Location within Poland
- Coordinates: 49°18′24″N 22°32′15″E
- Country: Poland
- Voivodeship: Subcarpathian
- County: Bieszczady
- Gmina: Czarna
- Population: 10

Chrewt [xrɛft] is a village in the administrative district of Gmina Czarna, within Bieszczady County, Subcarpathian Voivodeship, in south-eastern Poland, close to the border with Ukraine.
