= Tworylne =

- Village
- Location within Poland
- Coordinates: 49°16′4″N 22°28′38″E
- Country: Poland
- Voivodeship: Subcarpathian
- County: Bieszczady
- Gmina: Czarna
- Population: 0

Tworylne [tfɔˈrɨlnɛ] is a former village in the administrative district of Gmina Czarna, within Bieszczady County, Subcarpathian Voivodeship, in south-eastern Poland, close to the border with Ukraine.
