= Serednie Małe =

- Village
- Location within Poland
- Coordinates: 49°17′24″N 22°33′36″E
- Country: Poland
- Voivodeship: Subcarpathian
- County: Bieszczady
- Gmina: Czarna
- Population: 4

Serednie Małe [sɛˈrɛdɲɛ ˈmawɛ] is a village in the administrative district of Gmina Czarna, within Bieszczady County, Subcarpathian Voivodeship, in south-eastern Poland, close to the border with Ukraine.
