= Muczne massacre =

World War II crime in Poland

Coordinates: 49°07′43″N 22°44′39″E

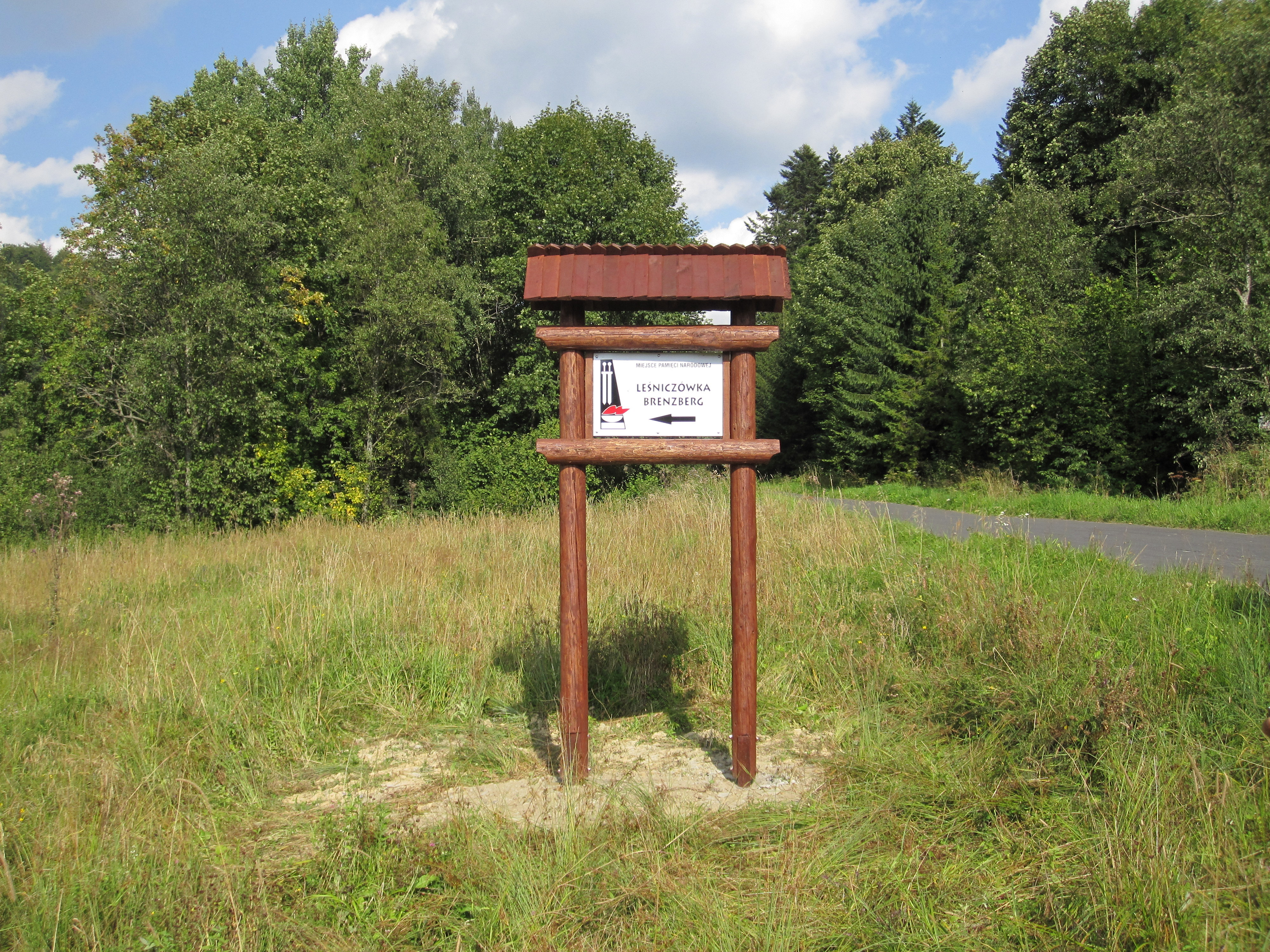
Muczne signpost leading to the forester's lodge "Brenzberg"

The Muczne massacre of 16 August 1944 was the massacre of Polish civilians committed by the Ukrainian Insurgent Army (UPA) in village Muczne located in Bieszczady County in Poland.

Among the Poles were mainly refugees after the repression of the population in Volhynia and retreating in front of - 70 Poles were murdered. They were residents of nearby villages such as foresters, priests and children. Members of the UPA murdered Poles with axes, pitchforks and scythes.

In place of the murder in 2010 the memorial and a wooden cross was erected.

== Sources ==
- Grzegorz Motyka, "Tak było w Bieszczadach. Walki polsko-ukraińskie w Polsce 1943-1948", Warszawa 1998
