= Gmina Czarna, Bieszczady County =

Gmina Czarna Czarna Commune
- Gmina
- Coat of arms
- Interactive map of Gmina Czarna
- Coordinates (Czarna): 49°19′27″N 22°40′3″E
- Country: Poland
- Voivodeship: Subcarpathian
- County: Bieszczady
- Seat: Czarna

Area
  - Total: 184.62 km^{2} (71.28 sq mi)

Population (2006)
  - Total: 2,393
  - Density: 12.96/km^{2} (33.57/sq mi)
- Website: http://www.czarna.pl/

Gmina Czarna is a rural gmina (administrative district) in Bieszczady County, Subcarpathian Voivodeship, in south-eastern Poland, on the border with Ukraine. Its seat is the village of Czarna, which lies approximately 14 kilometres (9 mi) south of Ustrzyki Dolne and 93 km (58 mi) south-east of the regional capital Rzeszów.

The gmina covers an area of 184.62 square kilometres (71.3 sq mi), and as of 2006 its total population is 2,393.

The gmina contains part of the protected area called San Valley Landscape Park.

== Villages ==
Gmina Czarna contains the villages and settlements of Bystre, Chrewt, Czarna, Czarna Dolna, Lipie, Michniowiec, Olchowiec, Paniszczów, Polana, Rabe, Rosochate, Rosolin, Serednie Małe, Sokołowa Wola, Tworylne, Wydrne and Żłobek.

== Neighbouring gminas ==
Gmina Czarna is bordered by the gminas of Cisna, Lutowiska, Solina and Ustrzyki Dolne. It also borders Ukraine.
