= Halyna Pahutiak =

Ukrainian writer

- Галина Пагутяк
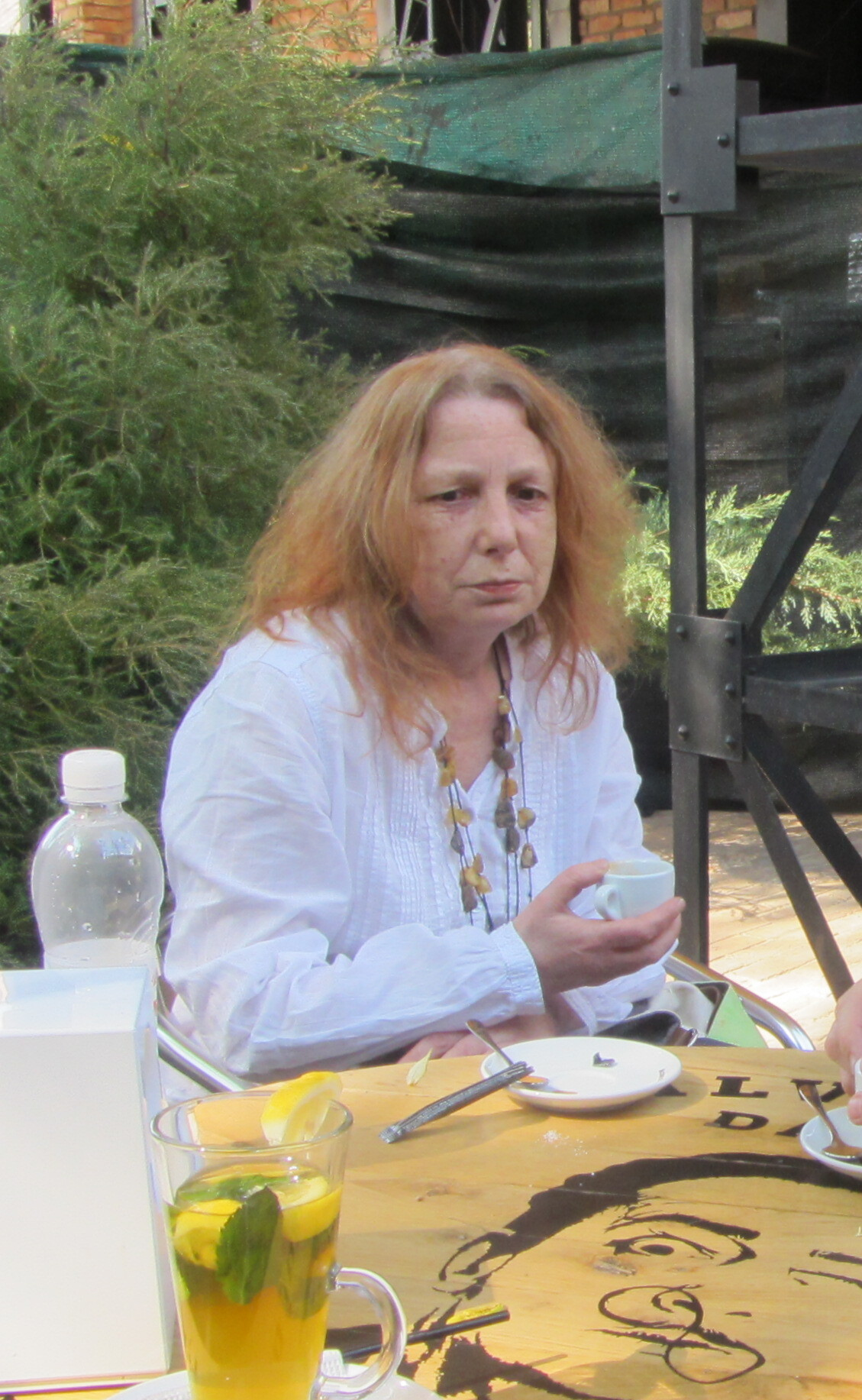
- Born: 26 July 1958 (age 68); Zalokot, Drohobych Oblast, Ukrainian SSR
- Occupations: novelist and short story writer
- Writing career
- Language: Ukrainian
- Notable awards: Shevchenko National Prize, 2010

Halyna Vasylivna Pahutiak (born 26 July 1958) is a Ukrainian writer known for her fantasy fiction. Combining "magic realism's hermetic style with popular genres and vampire themes", Pahutiak's stories employ "fantastic metamorphoses, maternal female visions, and infantile dreams". Her novel The Servant of Dobtomyl (2006) won the 2010 Shevchenko National Prize in literature nomination.

== Life ==
Pahutiak was born to a Boyko family in Zalokot, a village in the Drohobych region of Lviv Oblast in Western Ukraine. When she was a small child, her parents moved to Urizh, not far from the birthplace of the nineteenth-century Ukrainian writer Ivan Franko. After gaining a degree in Ukrainian philology from the Taras Shevchenko National University of Kyiv, she returned to her hometown and settled in Lviv. She published her first books during the Soviet era. She was very persistent and always went against the will of the publishers, not afraid to criticize Soviet customs. Nevertheless, the book "Master" (1986), published by the Kyiv publishing house "Soviet Writer", was published with a fantastic and for today's Ukraine circulation of 65 thousand copies.

The main character of Notes of a Little White Bird (1999) is a speechless woman, attuned to the plight of women whose children have died or a yet unborn, searching for a rapprochement between her self and language.

Pahutiak's story 'Avantiurkik z Urozha' (Adventurer from Urizh) deploys the genre of reconstruction reportage, opening with present-day experiences and memories before shifting smoothly to a seventeenth-century setting.

In 2015, an excerpt from the work of Halyna Pahutiak was used in the tasks of external independent evaluation (EIE) in the Ukrainian language without the author's permission. In five tasks (№ 29-33) it was necessary to analyze the philosophical text on the topic: "The small way is not for people…" and to give an answer to what the author wanted to say. In her open letter, Halyna Pahutiak called these tasks "absurd and an insult to the author's text."

== Critical reception ==
Pahutiak's vampire fiction has received particular critical attention.

== Works ==
=== Novels ===
- Hospodar. Roman, povist' . Kyiv: Radians'kyi pysmennyk, 1986.
- Potrapyty v sad. Roman, opovidannia. Kyiv: Molod', 1989.
- Zapysky biloho ptashka. Dva Romany ta povist' . [Notes of a Little White Bird], 1999.
- Scribe of the Eastern Gates Refuge. 2004.
- Sluha z Dobromylia [The Servant of Dobromyl]. 2006. Excerpt translated by Michael M. Naydan as 'The Minion From Dobromyl or The Vampire's Son', Metamorphoses 20: 1 (Spring 2012), pp. 218–237.
- Uriz’ka gityka [Urizh Gothic]. 2009.
- Zacharovani muzikanty [Enchanted Musicians]. 2010.

=== Short stories ===
- 'Avantiurkik z Urozha' [Adventurer from Urizh]
- 'To Find Yourself in a Garden', in Ed Hogan and Askold Melnyczuk, eds., From Three Worlds: New Ukrainian Writing. Zephyr Press, 1996.
- Ukradene misto [The Stolen Town], 2013. Inquire 3:2.
