= Rosolin =

- Village
- Location within Poland
- Coordinates: 49°18′54″N 22°35′18″E
- Country: Poland
- Voivodeship: Subcarpathian
- County: Bieszczady
- Gmina: Czarna
- Population: 0

Rosolin [rɔˈsɔlʲin] is a former village in the administrative district of Gmina Czarna, within Bieszczady County, Subcarpathian Voivodeship, in south-eastern Poland, close to the border with Ukraine.
