= Czarna, Bieszczady County =

Czarna
- Village
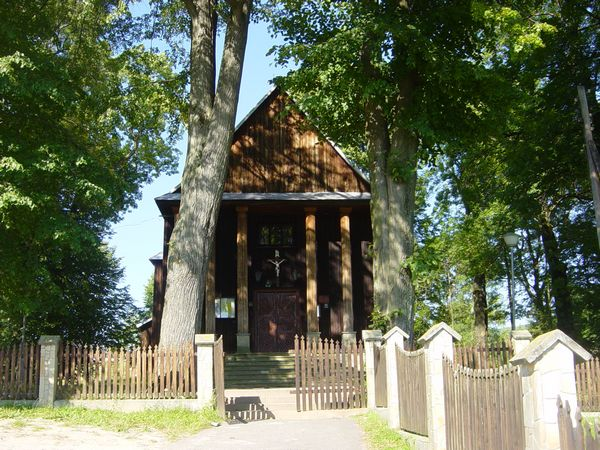
- Greek Catholic church of the Martyr Dymitr

- Coat of arms

- Location within Poland
- Coordinates: 49°19′27″N 22°40′3″E
- Country: Poland
- Voivodeship: Subcarpathian
- County: Bieszczady
- Gmina: Czarna
- Population: 1,300

Czarna [ˈt͡ʂarna] (Czarna Górna until 30 December 1999) is a village in Bieszczady County, Subcarpathian Voivodeship, in south-eastern Poland, close to the border with Ukraine. It is the seat of the gmina (administrative district) called Gmina Czarna.
