= Bieszczady County =

Bieszczady County Powiat bieszczadzki
- County
- Flag Coat of arms

- Location within the voivodeship
- Coordinates (Ustrzyki Dolne): 49°26′N 22°36′E
- Country: Poland
- Voivodeship: Subcarpathian
- Seat: Ustrzyki Dolne
- Gminas: Total 3: Gmina Czarna; Gmina Lutowiska; Gmina Ustrzyki Dolne

Area
  - Total: 1,138.17 km^{2} (439.45 sq mi)

Population (2019)
  - Total: 21,799
  - Density: 19.153/km^{2} (49.605/sq mi)
  - Urban: 9,097
  - Rural: 12,702
- Car plates: RBI
- Website: www.bieszczadzki.pl

Bieszczady County (Polish: powiat bieszczadzki) is a unit of territorial administration and local government (powiat) in Subcarpathian Voivodeship, in the extreme south-east of Poland, on the border with Ukraine. It takes its name from the Bieszczady mountain range. The county was created on January 1, 1999, as a result of the Polish local government reforms passed in 1998. In 2002 the western part of the county was split off to form Lesko County. The only town in Bieszczady County is now Ustrzyki Dolne, the county seat, which lies 80 kilometres (50 mi) south-east of the regional capital Rzeszów.

The county covers an area of 1,138.17 square kilometres (439.4 sq mi). As of 2019 its total population is 21,799, of which the population of Ustrzyki Dolne is 9,097, and the rural population is 12,702. Its average population density of 19.0 persons per square kilometre (49 persons/mi^{2}) makes it the least densely populated county in Poland.

The county includes the greater part of Bieszczady National Park (Bieszczadzki Park Narodowy), and is within the Polish part of the UNESCO-designated East Carpathian Biosphere Reserve.

== Neighbouring counties ==
Bieszczady County is bordered by Lesko County to the west and Przemyśl County to the north. It also borders Ukraine to the east and south.

== Administrative divisions ==
The county is subdivided into three gminas (one urban-rural and two rural). These are listed in the following table, in descending order of population.

| Gmina | Type | Area (km^{2}) | Population (2019) | Seat |
|---|---|---|---|---|
| Gmina Ustrzyki Dolne | urban-rural | 477.7 | 17,305 | Ustrzyki Dolne |
| Gmina Czarna | rural | 184.6 | 2,399 | Czarna |
| Gmina Lutowiska | rural | 475.9 | 2,095 | Lutowiska |

== Rural landscape pictures ==
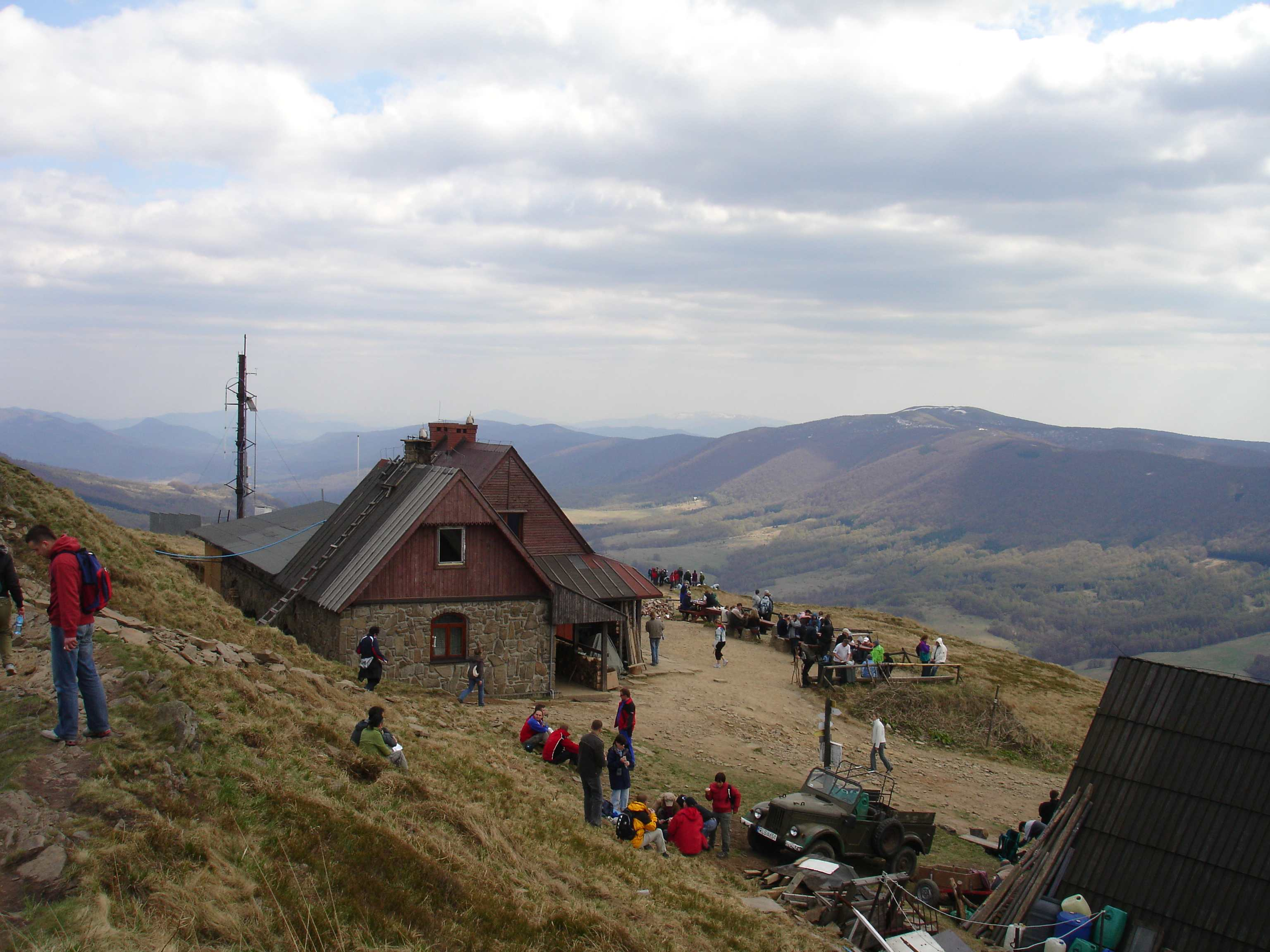

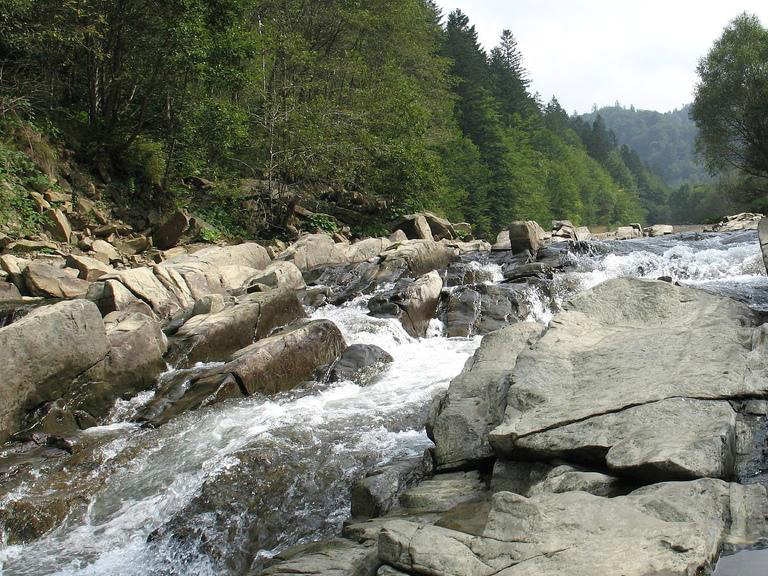

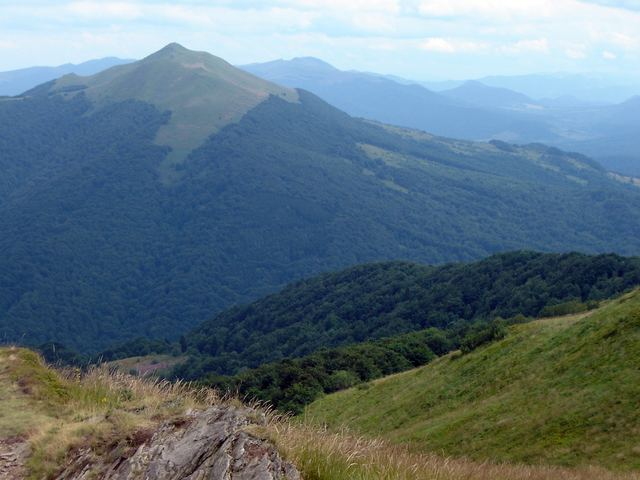

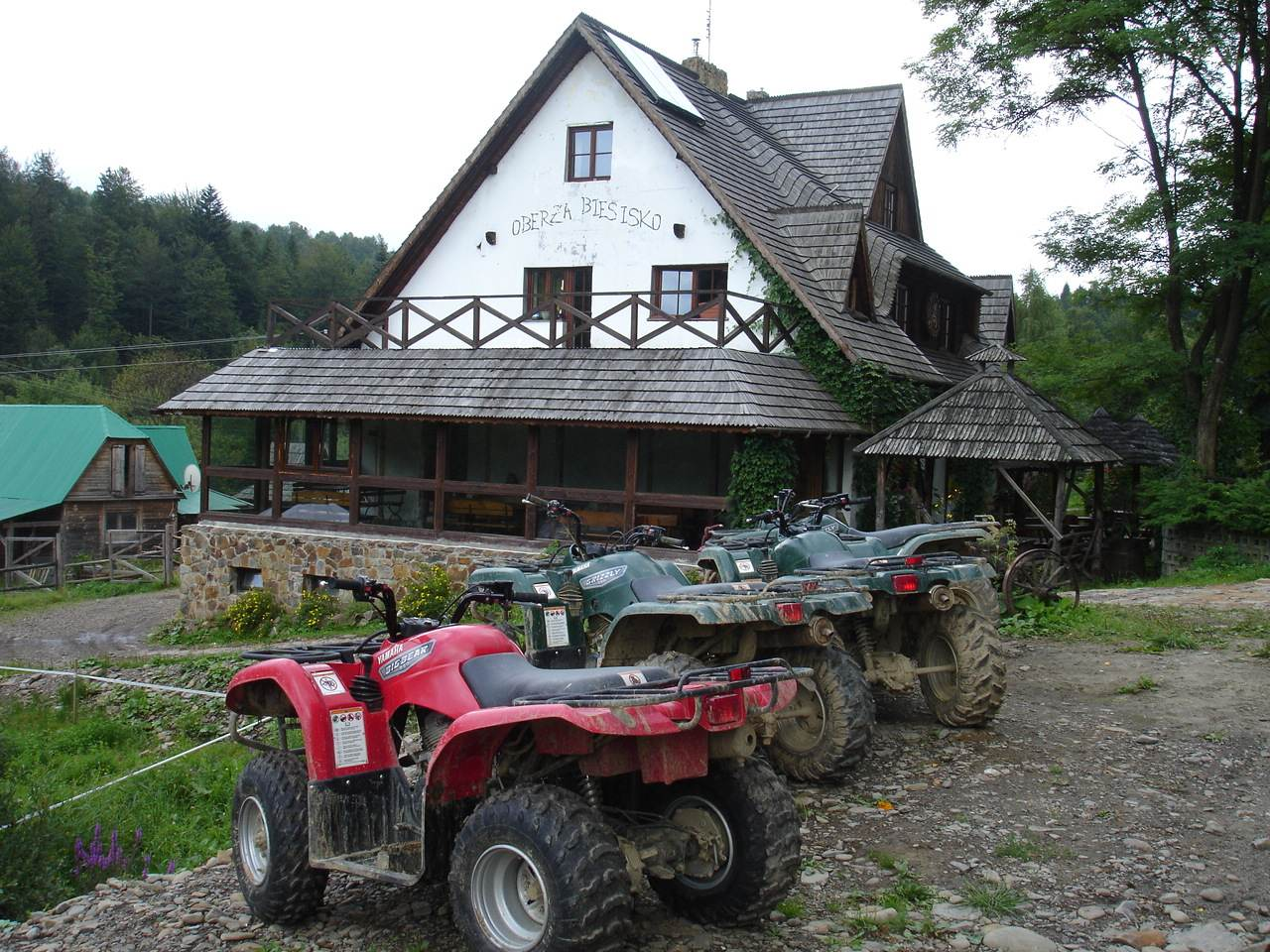

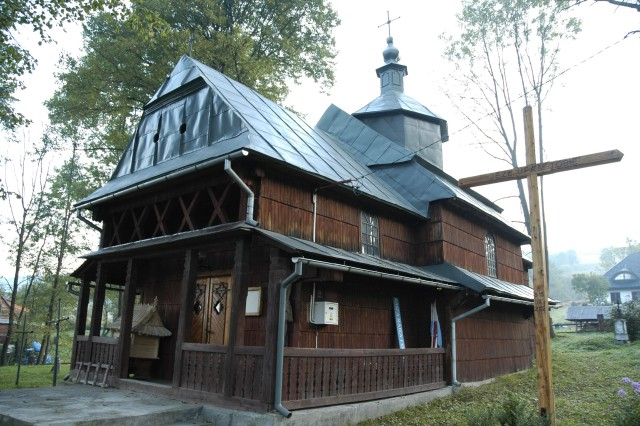

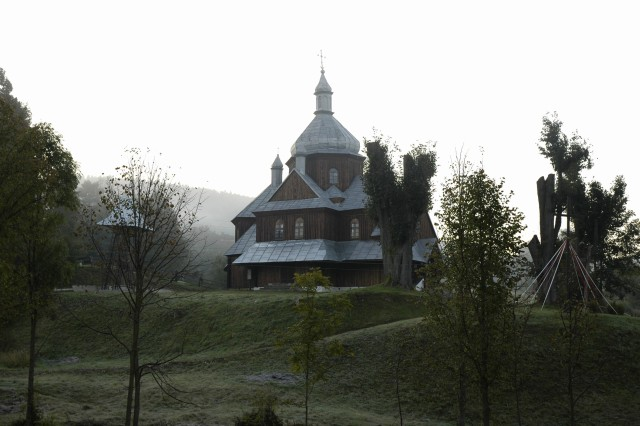

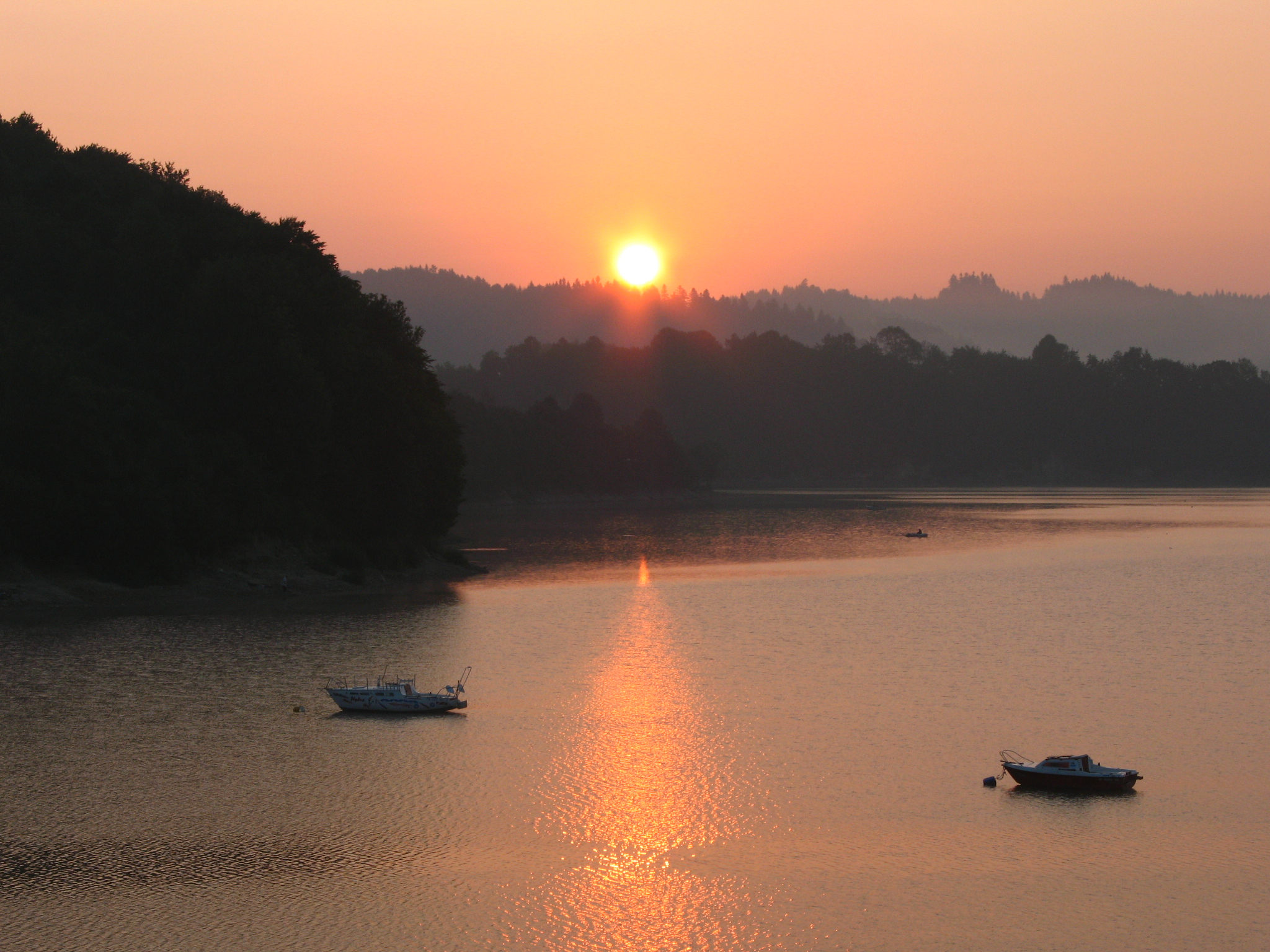

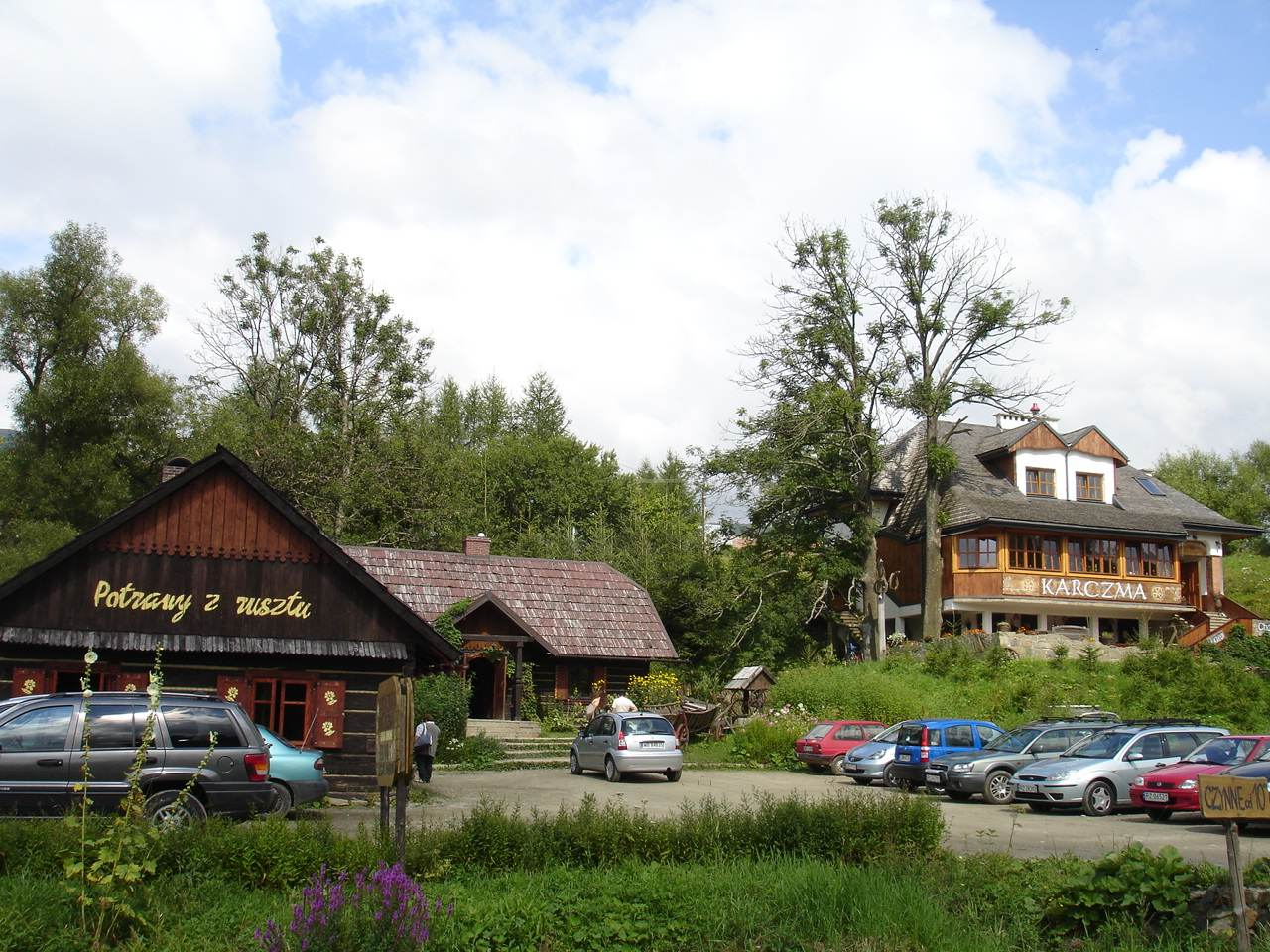

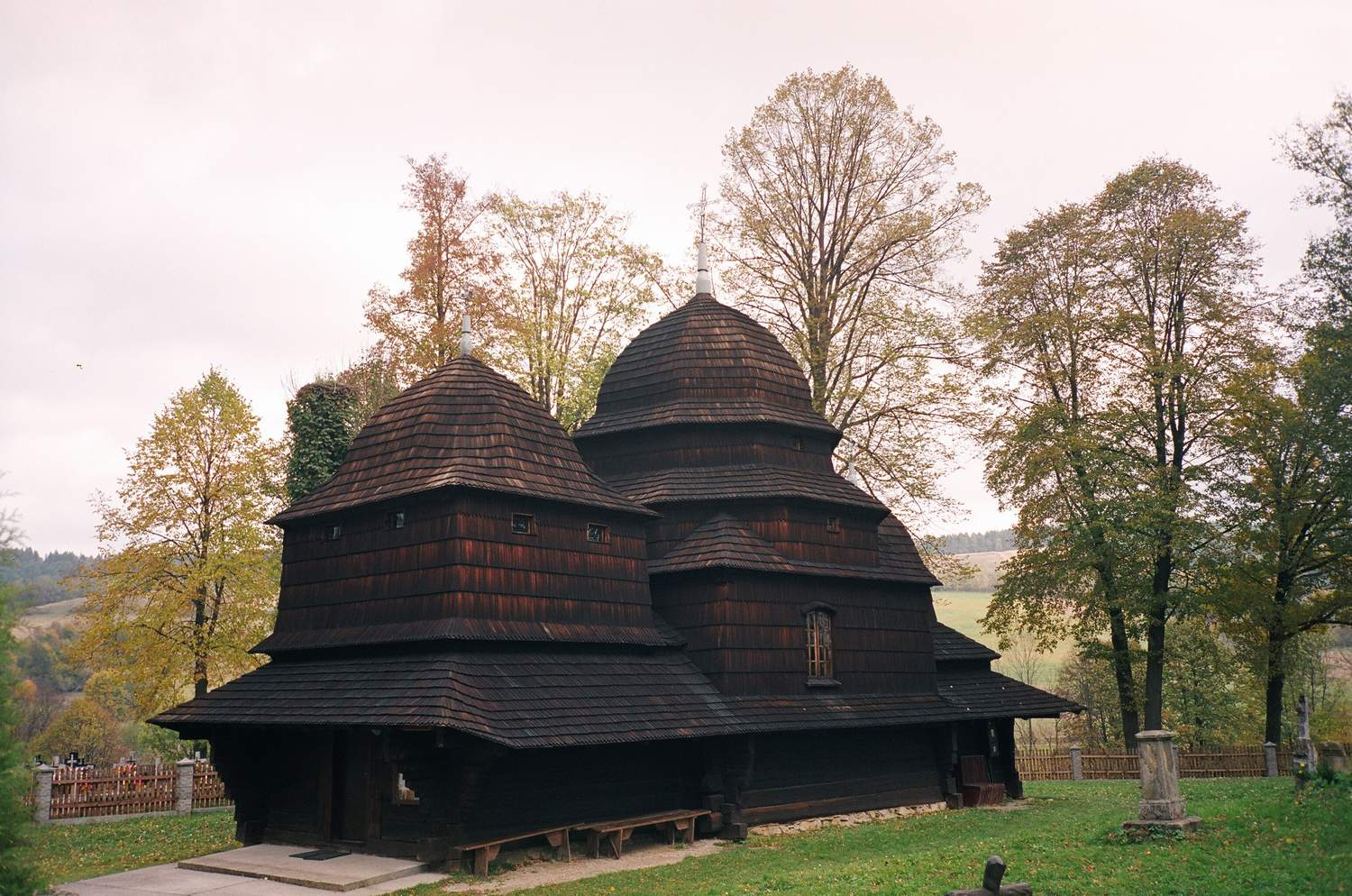

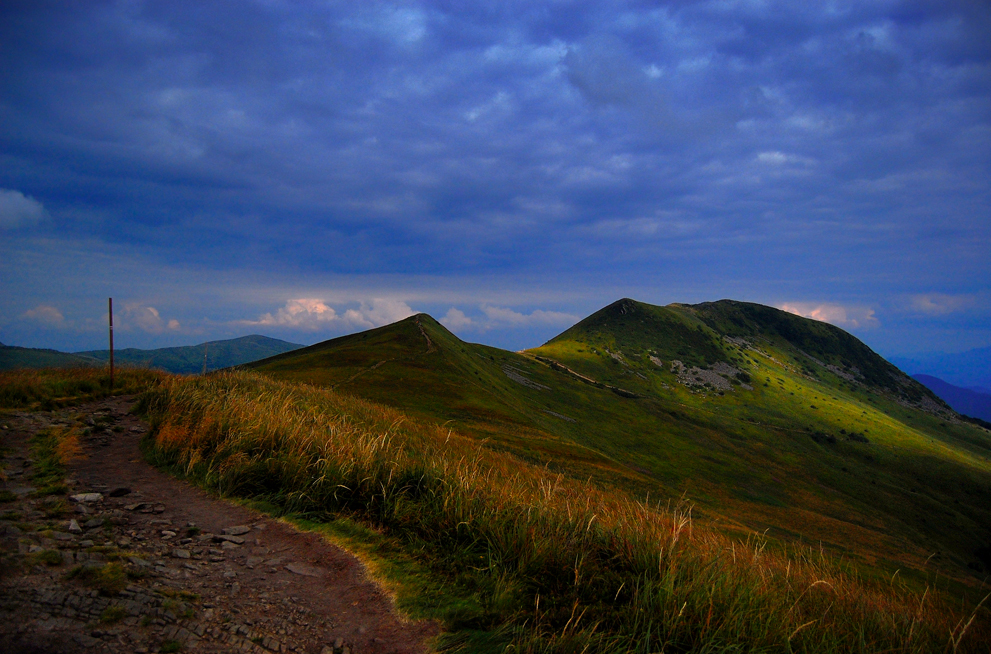

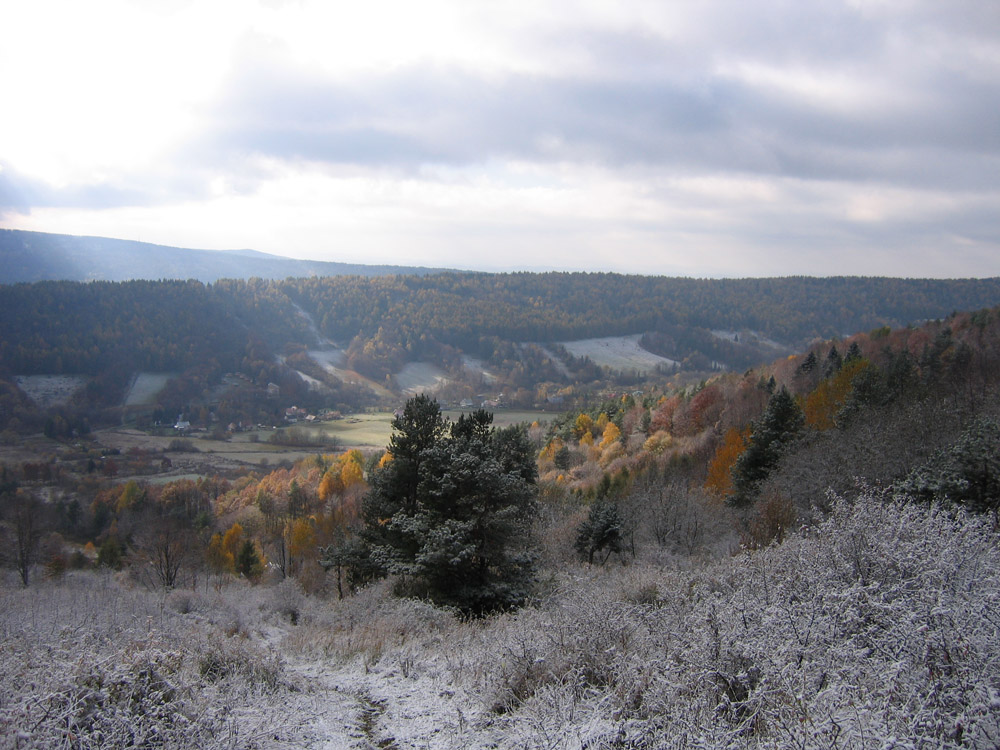

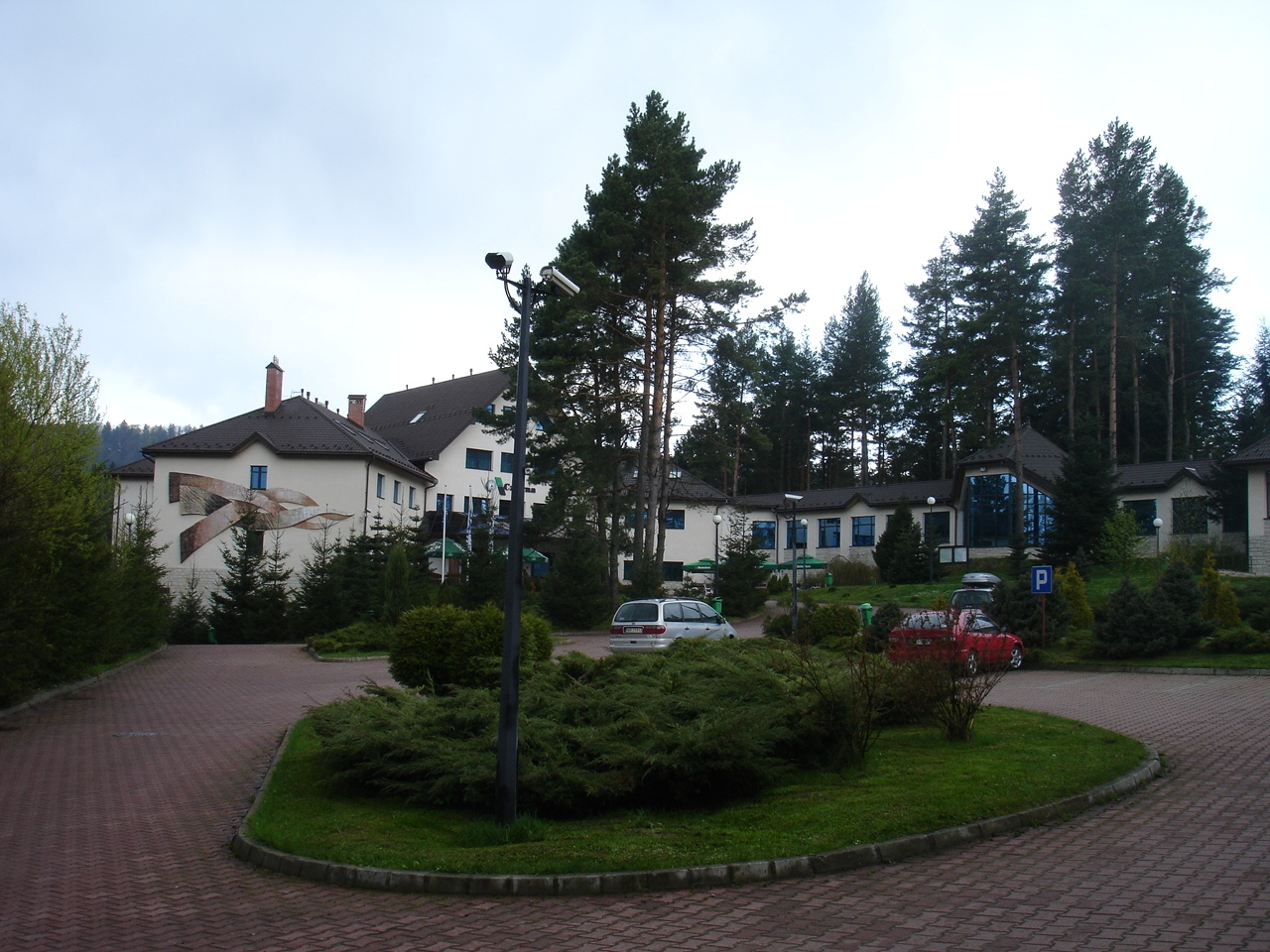
