= Sanok explosion =

Explosion of flammable liquids in Sanok, Poland

- Location: Sanok; Poland under German occupation
- Date: 2 August 1944; Afternoon
- Attack type: Explosion of flammable liquids
- Deaths: At least 22

On 2 August 1944, explosion of flammable liquids occurred in Sanok, Poland that resulted in fatalities of at least 22 people.

== Event ==
The incident took place during World War II in the final stages of the German occupation in the former Landkreis Sanok. In early August 1944, with the Eastern Front approaching and Red Army units advancing, the Germans were evacuating the area, demolishing the infrastructure of the Sanok Accumulator Factory in the Posada district and leaving nearby warehouses open. Before the war, during the Second Polish Republic, these warehouses belonged to the Sanok Rubber Company. During the occupation, they were used by a Ukrainian trading company, Weryka Kooperatywa Narodnej Torhiwli Soyuz, which supplied the local population (residents referred to the site as the "Soyuz warehouse"). As they retreated, the Germans reportedly encouraged locals to take goods from the warehouses.

On 2 August 1944, people from Sanok and nearby villages such as Stróże Wielkie, Olchowce, Zahutyń, Trepcza, and Niebieszczany were scavenging items from the warehouses, including scarce goods like food, lamp kerosene (the area was not yet electrified), and school supplies that attracted young people. In a two-story building near the fence by the San river, there were tanks whose contents were being checked, leading to spillage. People were transferring kerosene from large 200-liter barrels into smaller containers. One witness, then nearly 20-year-old Emil Buras, recounted that "kerosene was spilled everywhere, and people were wading in it up to their ankles". Alcohol was also present in the warehouses and consumed on-site. Other accounts noted that the area was covered with flammable liquids. It was later assumed that the explosion involved kerosene, oil, gasoline, alcohol, and possibly ammunition.

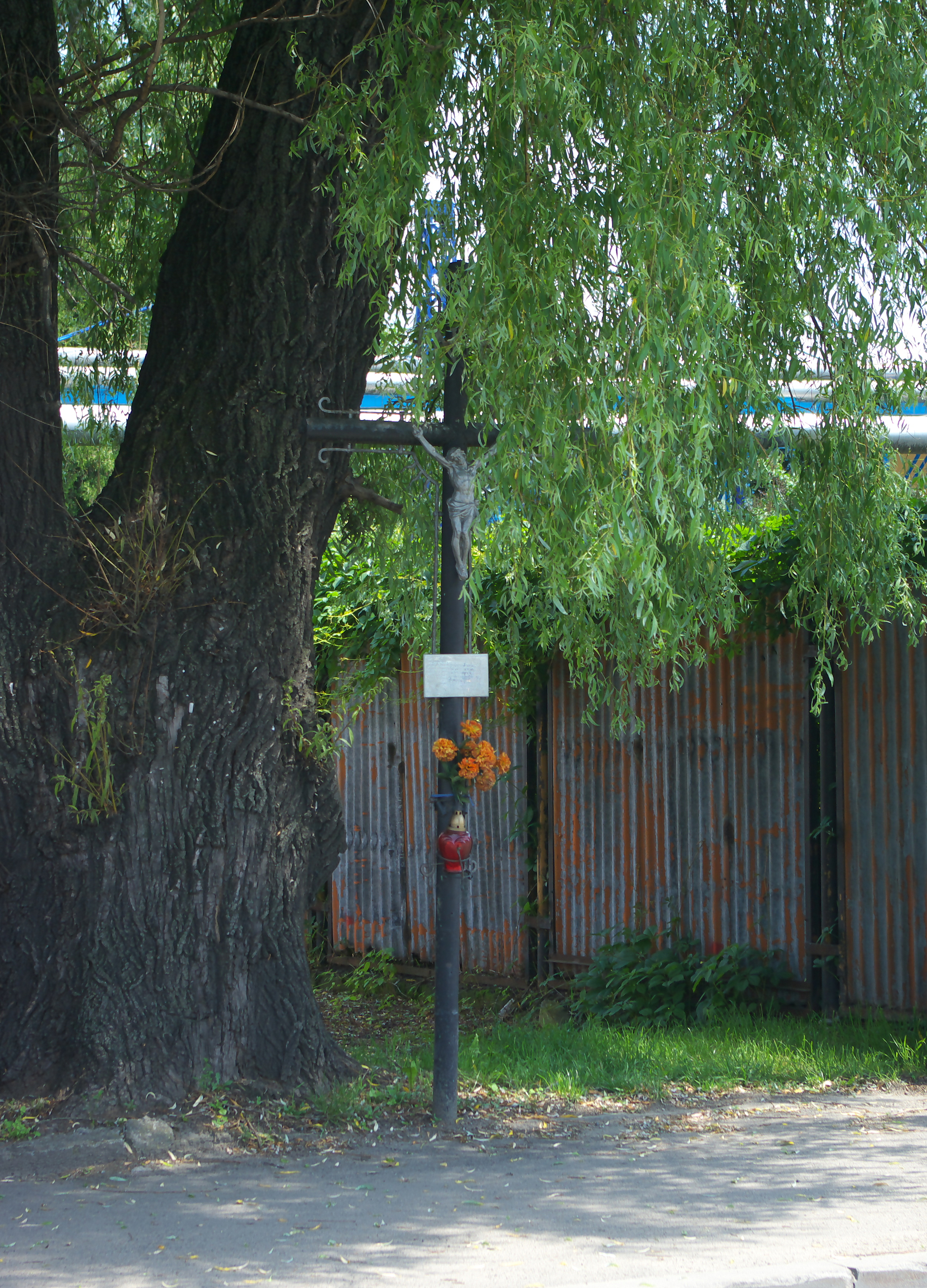
Memorial cross, until 2014 at Dworcowa Street

In the afternoon, likely after 3:00 PM and possibly around 5:00 PM, an explosion occurred due to the ignition of flammable materials accumulated on the ground. The exact cause of the explosion was never determined, with modern speculations suggesting a cigarette butt, an accidental spark, or even spontaneous combustion. The explosion was amplified by a subsequent blast in the former factory building by the San river, where other materials, possibly stored ammunition, detonated. Some victims were thrown dozens of meters into the air by the force of the explosion. Many died instantly. Survivors, engulfed in flames, ran instinctively toward the nearby San river, where some drowned due to the river's several-meter depth in that area and the effects of thermal shock. Others ran into nearby fields, attempting to extinguish the flames by rolling on the ground. Surviving burn victims received aid in nearby homes. The injured were taken to the Sanok hospital, where Dr. Marian Killar attempted to provide treatment. Despite efforts to save them, many victims succumbed to their burns.

The incident resulted in the deaths of dozens of people, with estimates suggesting up to 70 fatalities. Some victims from the Posada area were identified, but a complete list remains unknown, partly due to unidentified individuals from outside Sanok. Identifying those who died immediately was further complicated by the ongoing German-Soviet frontline battles in the Sanok region. The names of 22 fatalities were verified. Some families could not locate the bodies of their loved ones. One victim was 15-year-old Adam Żołnierczyk, whose body was taken home by his family but was later burned during Red Army shelling.

== Commemoration ==
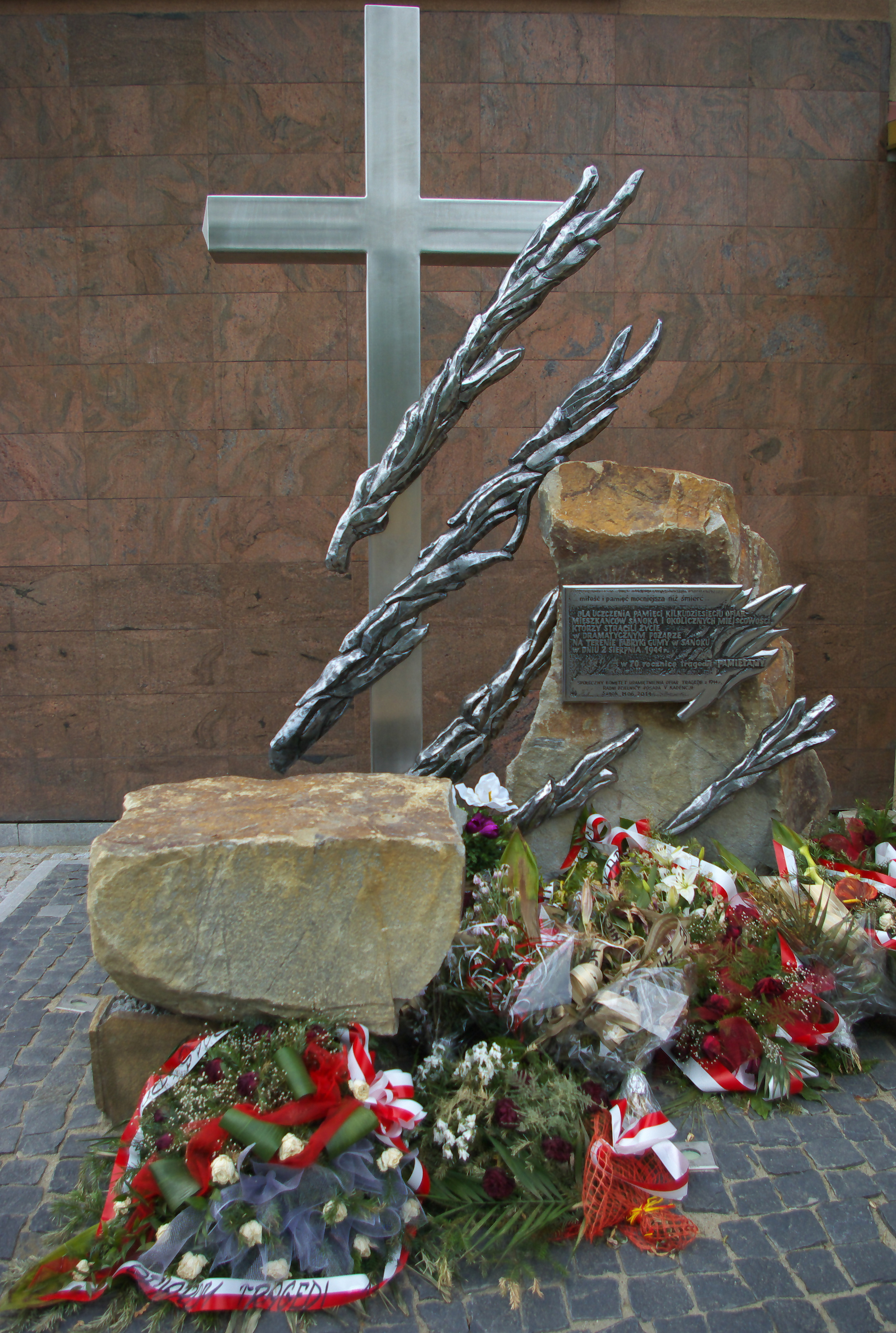
Monument since 2014

In August 1945, witness Józef Baszak, along with Jan Dyrkacz and Zdzisław Baszak, planted a willow tree at the site of the explosion. That same year, a metal cross was erected, initiated by Adam Baszak and Roman Bobala and crafted by blacksmith Andrzej Bar. On the 50th anniversary of the explosion in 1994, at the initiative of the Sanoczanie senior club, with support from Posada district residents and its council, a new commemorative cross was erected next to the willow tree. A plaque was attached with the inscription: "This cross was erected to commemorate the dozens of people who tragically died in flames as living torches due to the explosion of flammable materials at the rubber factory on 2 August 1944. Their memory will remain alive in our hearts. Residents of the Posada District" (some sources date this to 1994, while others suggest 2001).

On 12 November 2012, the Social Committee for Commemorating the Victims of the 1944 Tragedy in Sanok's Posada District was formed, consisting of district and city councilors from Posada, chaired by Zbigniew Czerwiński. The monument was designed by Adam Przybysz. Architectural work was handled by Krystyna Jurasińska and Mariola Sidor, with electrical aspects by Jan Kostka. On 14 June 2014, after a Mass at the Church of the Sacred Heart of Jesus, a new monument was unveiled near the existing cross at the intersection of Mateusz Beksiński and Dworcowa streets, by the wall of the Stomil East building and near the former Chemist's House. The ceremony was attended by figures including Podkarpackie Voivode Małgorzata Chomycz-Śmigielska, Sanok Mayor Wojciech Blecharczyk, and Sanok City Council Chairman Jan Oklejewicz. The monument was blessed by priests from three Sanok parishes: Father Piotr Buk, Father Bartosz Rakoczy, and Franciscan Father Józef Madura. The monument was unveiled by Ludmiła Domogała (representing the victims' families), Małgorzata Chomycz-Śmigielska, and Wojciech Blecharczyk, with Father Piotr Buk performing the blessing. The monument features a cross surrounded by flames. A commemorative plaque was placed on the granite monument. The inscription reads: "...love and memory stronger than death... In honor of the memory of dozens of victims – residents of Sanok and surrounding areas who lost their lives in the tragic fire at the Sanok Rubber Factory on 2 August 1944. On the 70th anniversary of the tragedy, we remember. Social Committee for Commemorating the Victims of the 1944 Tragedy. Posada District Councilors, 5th Term. Sanok, 14.06.2014".

After the 2014 monument was erected, the previous metal cross with its plaque was relocated to the Posada Cemetery. In 2014, on the 70th anniversary of the event, a publication titled Byli jak żywe pochodnie... W 70. rocznicę tragedii w dawnej fabryce gumy w Sanoku (They Were Like Living Torches... On the 70th Anniversary of the Tragedy at the Former Rubber Factory in Sanok) was released, authored by Waldemar Bałda.

== Bibliography ==
- Bałda, Waldemar (2014). Byli jak żywe pochodnie... W 70. rocznicę tragedii w dawnej fabryce gumy w Sanoku [They Were Like Living Torches... On the 70th Anniversary of the Tragedy at the Former Rubber Factory in Sanok] (in Polish). Sanok: Społeczny Komitet Budowy Pomnika Ofiar Tragedii z 1944 r. w Sanockiej Dzielnicy Posada. ISBN 978-83-934-513-8-8.
- Baszak, Józef; Romaniak, Andrzej; Zając, Edward (2020). "Okres II wojny światowej (1939–1944)" [World War II Period (1939–1944)]. Sanockie Zakłady Przemysłu Gumowego "Stomil" w Sanoku 1931–1991 [Sanok Rubber Industry Plants "Stomil" in Sanok 1931–1991] (in Polish). Sanok: Muzeum Historyczne w Sanoku. ISBN 978-83-60380-45-1.
