= Czerteż =

- Village
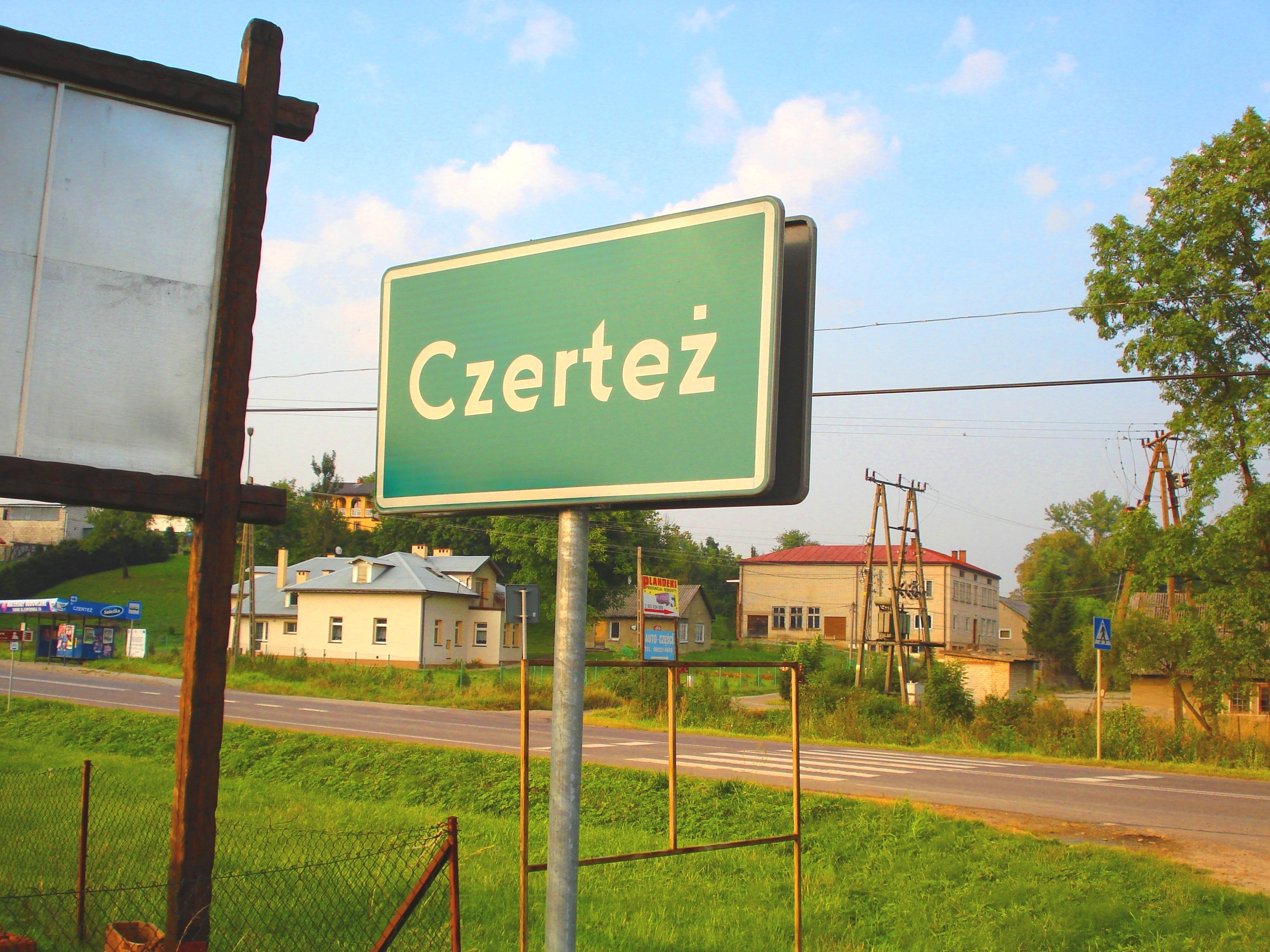
- Czerteż road sign

- Location within Poland
- Coordinates: 49°35′00″N 22°10′00″E
- Country: Poland
- Voivodeship: Subcarpathian
- County: Sanok
- Gmina: Sanok
- Founded: 1339

Area
  - Land: 3.36 km^{2} (1.30 sq mi)
- Elevation: 346 m (1,135 ft)

Population
  - Total: 720

Czerteż [ˈt͡ʂɛrtɛs] is a village in East Małopolska in the Lesser Beskid mountains, in the district called Gmina Sanok. It is situated below the main watershed at the foot of the Słonne Mountains, and has an elevation of 346 metres. Situated in the Subcarpathian Voivodship (since 1999), previously in Krosno Voivodship (1975–1998) and Sanok district, Sanok subdistrict (7 km (4 mi) west of Sanok), parish Kostarowce. In Czerteż is The Agricultural Production Cooperative "Unity"

== History ==
Czerteż was founded in 1339 by prince Bolesław Jerzy II of Mazovia, and was originally named Czerteznyki ( en. Handicrafts ).

In 966–1018, 1340–1772 (Ruthenian Voivodeship) and 1918–1939 Czertez was part of Poland. Between 1772 and 1918 it belonged to Austrian empire, later Austrian-Hungarian empire when double monarchy was introduced in Austria. It is the oldest settlement in the Sanoczek river-basin.

== Religion ==
In the center of the village there is a wooden Greek-Catholic church of the Transfiguration of Our Lord dating to 1742. It was renovated in 1877 and 1924. It is an excellent examples of Boyko architecture.
