= Srogów =

Srogów may refer to the following places in Poland:

- Srogów Dolny
- Srogów Górny
