= Pakoszówka =

- Village
- Location within Poland
- Coordinates: 49°38′N 22°6′E
- Country: Poland
- Voivodeship: Subcarpathian
- County: Sanok
- Gmina: Sanok

Pakoszówka [pakɔˈʂufka] is a village in the administrative district of Gmina Sanok, within Sanok County, Subcarpathian Voivodeship, in south-eastern Poland.

== Geography ==
The village Pakoszówka is under the mountain Wroczen (498 metres (1,630 ft)), which is located between the villages Pakoszówka and Lalin.

== History ==
Of the Earth Pakoszówka have been already populated by ancient dukes of Kievan Rus. According to information from the historical village was founded in 1348 by Nicholas Pakosz.

The area around Pakoszówka was settled as early as the end of the 3rd Century BC by the Przeworsk culture and lasted to around the 5th century AD. There have also been sites found to include artifacts from the Roman period.
Bronze bracelet from the 3rd century BC, fragments of pottery, a fragment of glass bracelet and a gold coin has been discovered in Pakoszówka near Sanok (Subcarpathian province). This ornament is one of the most valuable objects associated with the Celts discovered in the region. The Celts were the pioneers of the use of iron in Europe.

== Famous residents ==
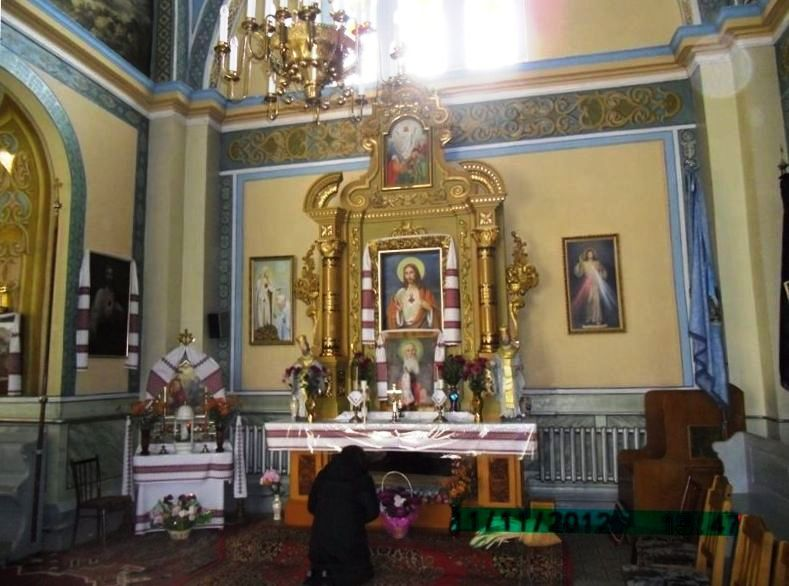
Stryi. The relics of the blessed of Josaphat Kotsylovsky.

- Josaphat Kotsylovsky (1876, Pakoszówka – 1947, Kiev) – a Ukrainian Greek Catholic bishop and martyr. He was born in the village of Pakoszowka.
- Hryhorii Kosar (1867, Pakoszówka - 1918, Buzhok), cousin by Josaphat Kotsylovsky – true pastor Ukrainian Greek Catholic Church. Gathering of material about his sacrificial life engaged in mission Postulation Center for the Beatification and Canonization of Saints of the UGCC.

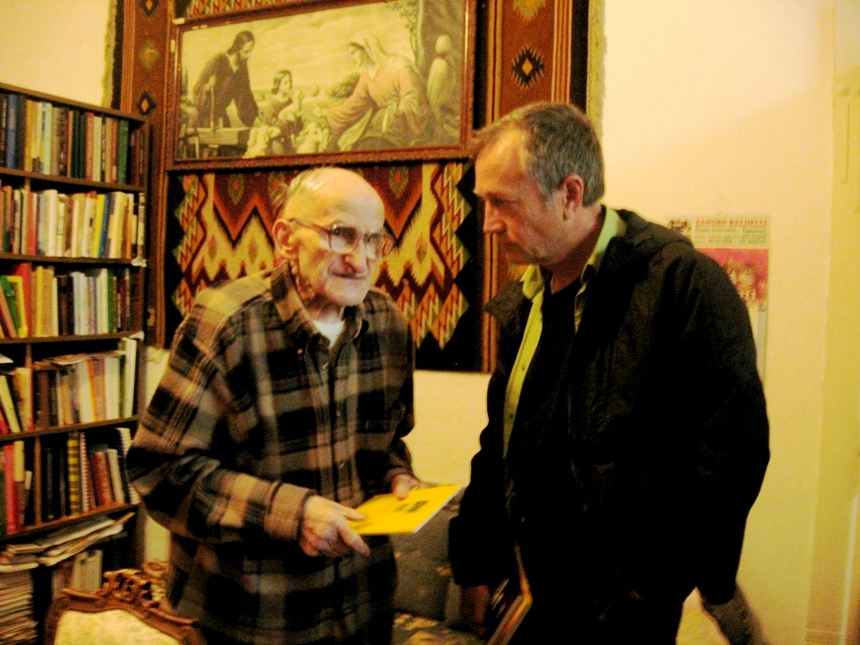
Sanok. Vladimir Martszak and Taras Kosar. 28 June 2011.

- Volodymyr Marczak (b. 1922, Pakoszówka – October 16, 2016, Sanok) – Polish writer and poet of Ukrainian origin. He is especially known for the “Ukrainiec w Polsce” series of books talking about his experiences as an ethnic Ukrainian growing up in a religiously sanitized Poland after World War II.
