= Markowce =

- Village
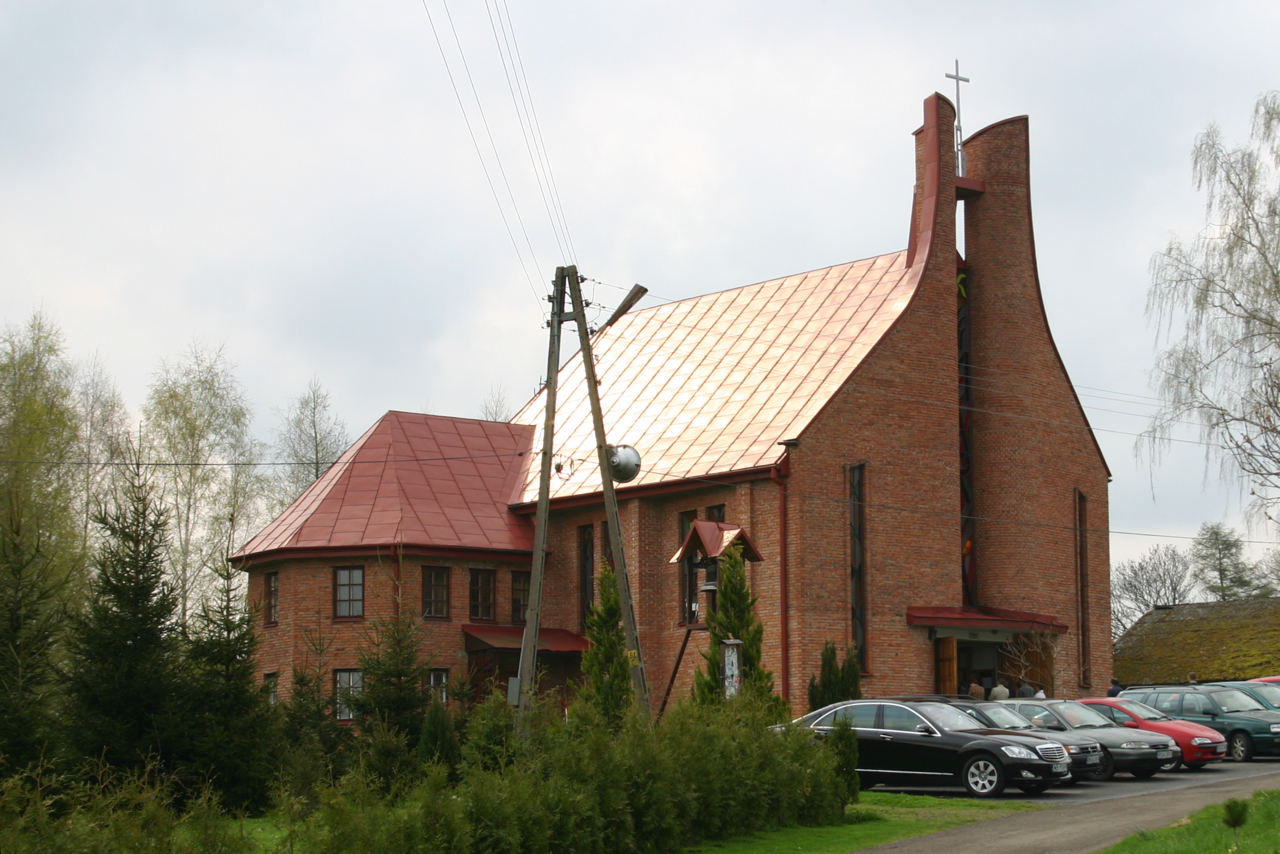

- Location within Poland
- Coordinates: 49°33′N 22°7′E
- Country: Poland
- Voivodeship: Subcarpathian
- County: Sanok
- Gmina: Sanok
- Population: 510

Markowce [marˈkɔft͡sɛ] is a village in the administrative district of Gmina Sanok, within Sanok County, Subcarpathian Voivodeship, in south-eastern Poland.
