= Zabłotce, Sanok County =

Zabłotce
- Village
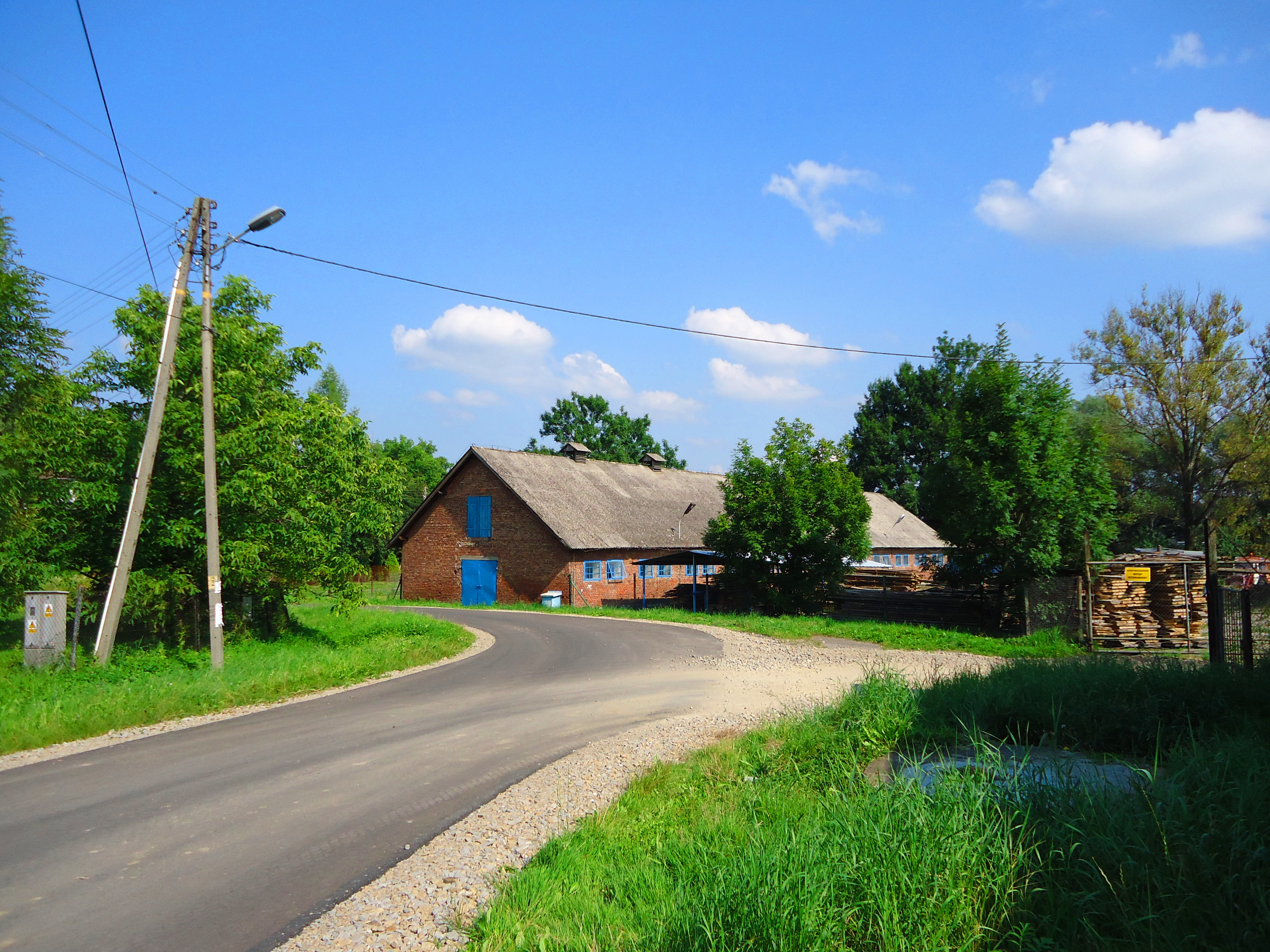
- Farm in the Village Zablotce

- Location within Poland
- Coordinates: 49°34′18″N 22°09′11″E
- Country: Poland
- Voivodeship: Subcarpathian
- County: Sanok
- Gmina: Sanok
- Population: 400

Zabłotce [zaˈbwɔt͡sːɛ] is a village in the administrative district of Gmina Sanok, within Sanok County, Subcarpathian Voivodeship, in south-eastern Poland.
