= Olchowce =

District of Sanok, Poland

- District
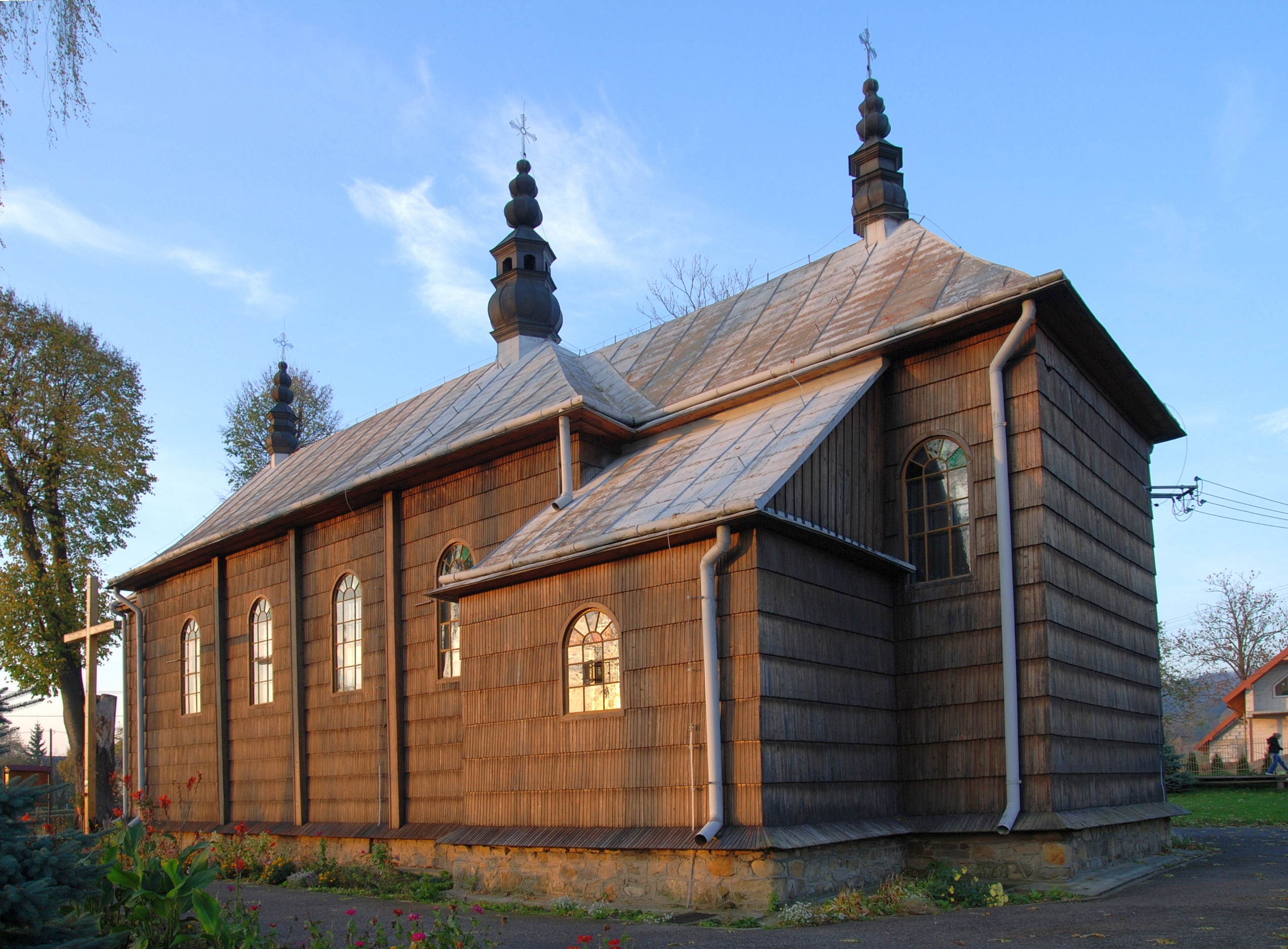
- Historic former Orthodox church

- Location within Poland
- Coordinates: 49°33′14″N 22°14′02″E
- Country: Poland
- Voivodeship: Subcarpathian Voivodeship
- County: Sanok County
- City: Sanok
- Established: 15th century
- Incorporated into Sanok: 1 November 1972
- Postal code: 38-500
- Vehicle registration: RSA

Olchowce is a district of Sanok, located along National Road 28. Once an independent village, it was incorporated into Sanok on 1 November 1972.

== History ==
Olchowce was first documented on 18 August 1444, when King Władysław III of Poland, also King of Hungary, granted Piotr Czeszyk of Rytarowce an empty lan in the royal village of Olchowce, located in the Sanok Land. This land, previously cultivated by the Sanok starosta for the castle's needs, was occupied by peasants Subal and Szymko. Olchowce likely served as a royal village supporting the Sanok castle. By 1699, it was referred to as "Posada Olchowska", a term still used informally today.

Situated in the Sanok Land of the Ruthenian Voivodeship during the late 16th and early 17th centuries, Olchowce, then spelled Olchowcze, was part of the Zarszyn estate under the Krosno starosta in the mid-17th century.

In 1812, Austrian authorities established a horse breeding and remount department in Olchowce, which was relocated to Drohobych in 1822. On 31 October 1851, during his journey through Galicia, Emperor Franz Joseph I of Austria visited the Olchowce stud farm, led by Captain Kaspar Müller. Crossing a hastily built bridge over the San river, he inspected the herd and performed several equestrian maneuvers before continuing to Sanok.

In the mid-19th century (1850s and 1860s), the tabular estates (former noble lands) of Olchowce, including Międzybrodzie and Posada Olchowce, were government-owned. By the 1870s and 1880s, these estates were owned by Sanok bankers Abisch and Sosie (or Zofia) Kanner. An 1886 record describes an estate in Olchowce with an unfinished manor, outbuildings, stables, barns, and granaries. On 9 August 1889, brothers Józef and Stanisław Nowak purchased the Olchowce estate, spanning 5,000 morgens, for 350,000 PLN. By the 1890s, Józef Nowak was listed as the sole owner. After his death in 1901, his heirs, including sons Tadeusz and Eugeniusz, inherited the estate. By 1911, Tadeusz and Eugeniusz were recorded as co-owners, and the estate remained with Józef's heirs through 1918. In the Second Polish Republic, the estate was owned by Józef and Antoni Nowak before 1930, and by Roman Nowak by 1939.

In 1910, a post office opened in Olchowce. By the early 1910s, Olchowce was considered a summer resort, with rental homes offered by Karol Niedzielski from Krosno.

After 1914, a horse stud (K.k. Hengsten Depot) operated in Posada for the uhlan garrison. During the Second Polish Republic, Olchowce hosted branches of the Riflemen's Association, the National Unity Camp, and a Kaczkowski reading room.

From September 1939 to June 1941, Olchowce was under Soviet occupation, separated from Sanok by the Molotov Line. After the German invasion of the Soviet Union in June 1941, the Nazis established a POW camp for Soviet prisoners in the local military barracks, operating until July 1944 and holding about 20,000 prisoners.

In spring 1946, Olchowce was burned by the Ukrainian Insurgent Army. A resident recalled hearing gunfire and grenade explosions, with no aid from local military or security forces. Today, a Soviet Prisoners of War Cemetery exists among residential buildings.

Post-war, the former stud and barracks housed a Polish People's Army tank unit (26th Medium Tank Regiment). From 8 February 1990, the barracks were repurposed for the Military Recruitment Center at 1 Przemyska Street, and since 2006, the county police headquarters at Witkiewicza Street.

In 1972, Olchowce was incorporated into the city of Sanok.

On 21 August 1993, a homeless shelter, consecrated by Archbishop Józef Michalik, opened at 11 Hetmańska Street under the auspices of the Sanok branch of the Saint Brother Albert Aid Society.
