= Łodzina =

- Village
- Location within Poland
- Coordinates: 49°39′08″N 22°16′35″E
- Country: Poland
- Voivodeship: Subcarpathian
- County: Sanok
- Gmina: Sanok
- Population: 280

Łodzina [wɔˈd͡ʑina] is a village in the administrative district of Gmina Sanok, within Sanok County, Subcarpathian Voivodeship, in south-eastern Poland.
