= Liszna, Sanok County =

Liszna
- Village
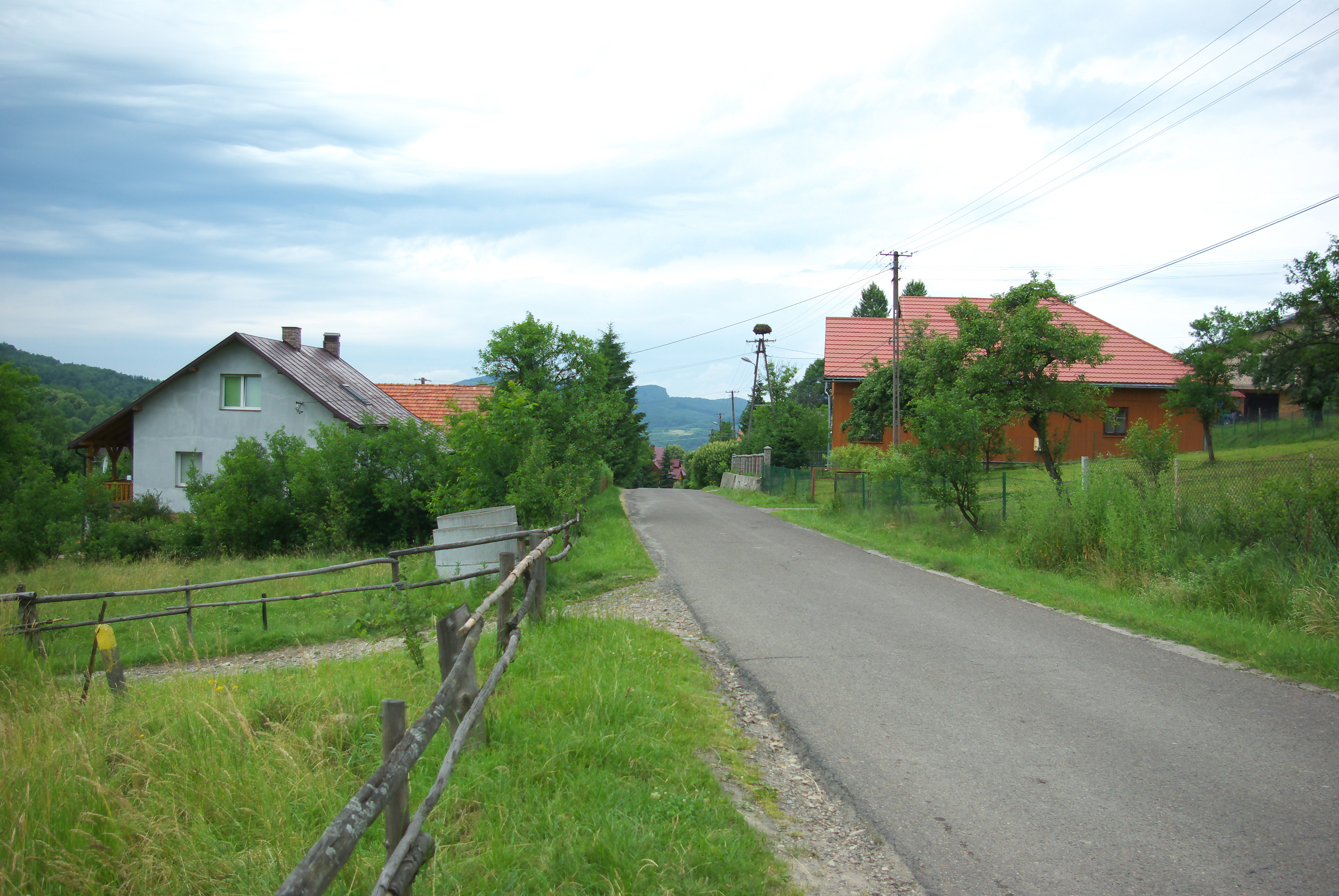

- Location within Poland
- Coordinates: 49°33′N 22°13′E
- Country: Poland
- Voivodeship: Subcarpathian
- County: Sanok
- Gmina: Sanok
- Elevation: 564 m (1,850 ft)
- Population: 340

Liszna [ˈlʲiʂna] is a village in the administrative district of Gmina Sanok, within Sanok County, Subcarpathian Voivodeship, in south-eastern Poland.
