= Gmina Sanok =

Gmina Sanok Sanok Commune
- Gmina
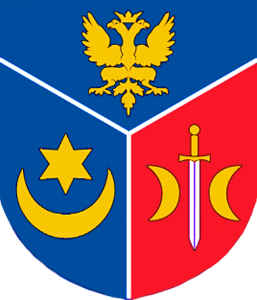
- Flag Coat of arms
- Interactive map of Gmina Sanok
- Coordinates (Sanok): 49°33′N 22°13′E
- Country: Poland
- Voivodeship: Subcarpathian
- County: Sanok
- Seat: Sanok

Area
  - Total: 231.38 km^{2} (89.34 sq mi)

Population (2006)
  - Total: 16,802
  - Density: 72.616/km^{2} (188.08/sq mi)
- Website: http://www.gmina.sanok.com.pl

Gmina Sanok is a rural gmina (administrative district) in Sanok County, Subcarpathian Voivodeship, in south-eastern Poland. Its seat is the town of Sanok, although the town is not part of the territory of the gmina.

The gmina covers an area of 231.38 square kilometres (89.3 sq mi), and as of 2006 its total population is 16,802.

The gmina contains part of the protected area called Słonne Mountains Landscape Park.

== Villages ==
Gmina Sanok contains the villages and settlements of Bykowce, Czerteż, Dębna, Dobra, Falejówka, Hłomcza, Jędruszkowce, Jurowce, Kostarowce, Lalin, Liszna, Łodzina, Markowce, Międzybrodzie, Mrzygłód, Niebieszczany, Pakoszówka, Pisarowce, Płowce, Prusiek, Raczkowa, Sanoczek, Srogów Dolny, Srogów Górny, Strachocina, Stróże Małe, Stróże Wielkie, Trepcza, Tyrawa Solna, Wujskie, Zabłotce and Załuż.

== Neighbouring gminas ==
Gmina Sanok is bordered by the gminas of Bircza, Brzozów, Bukowsko, Dydnia, Lesko, Tyrawa Wołoska, Zagórz and Zarszyn.

== Rural landscape picture ==
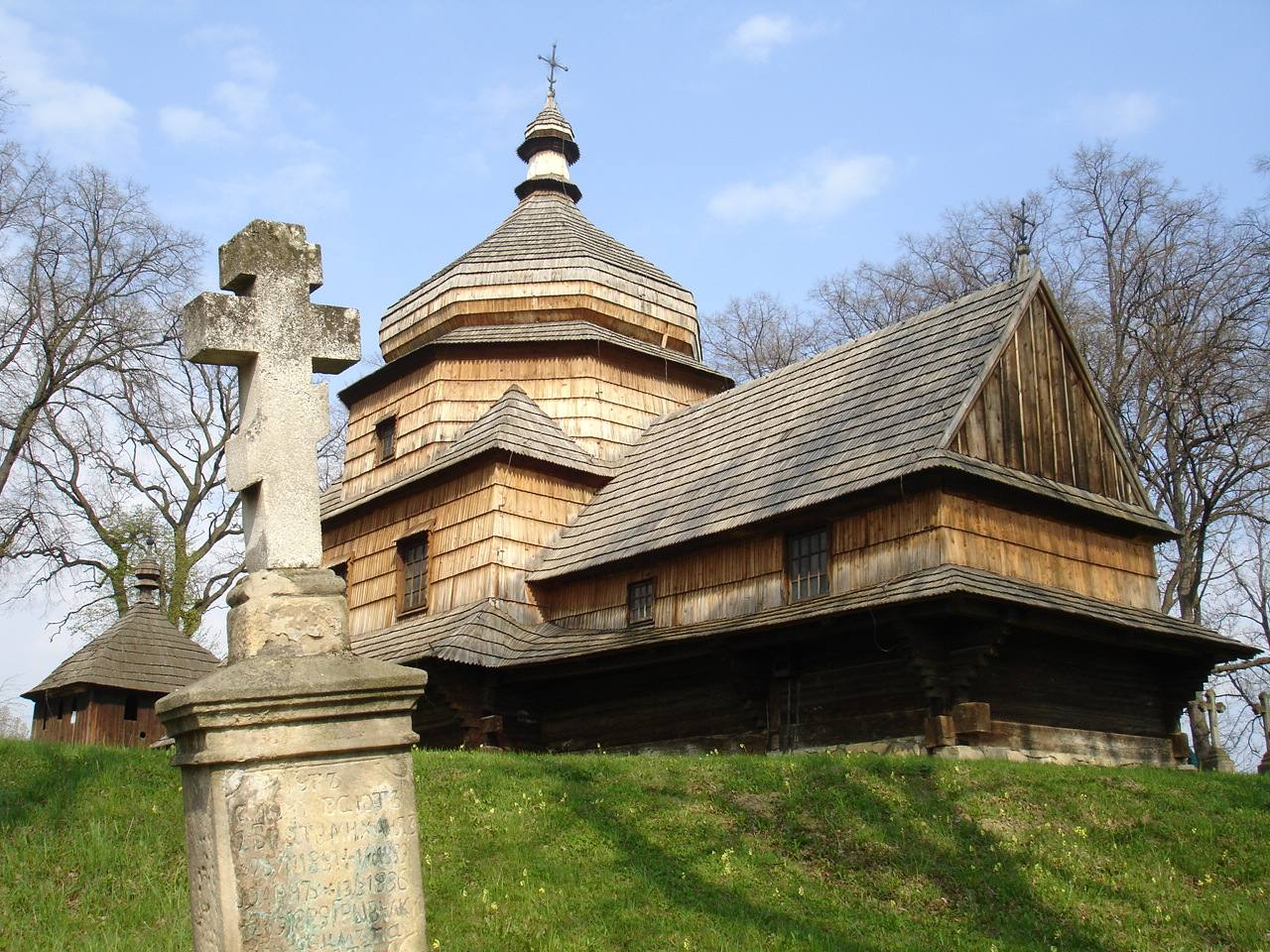

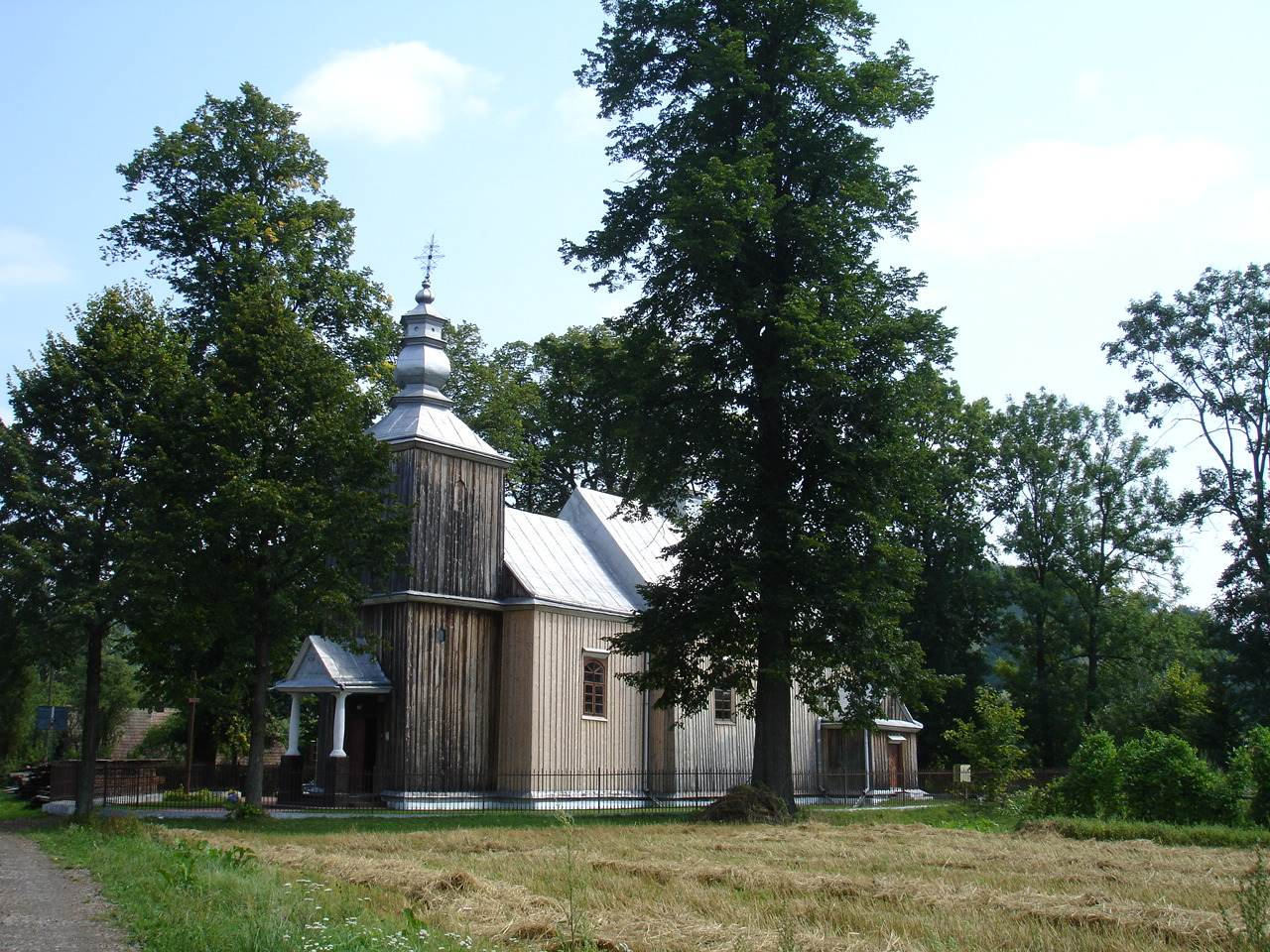

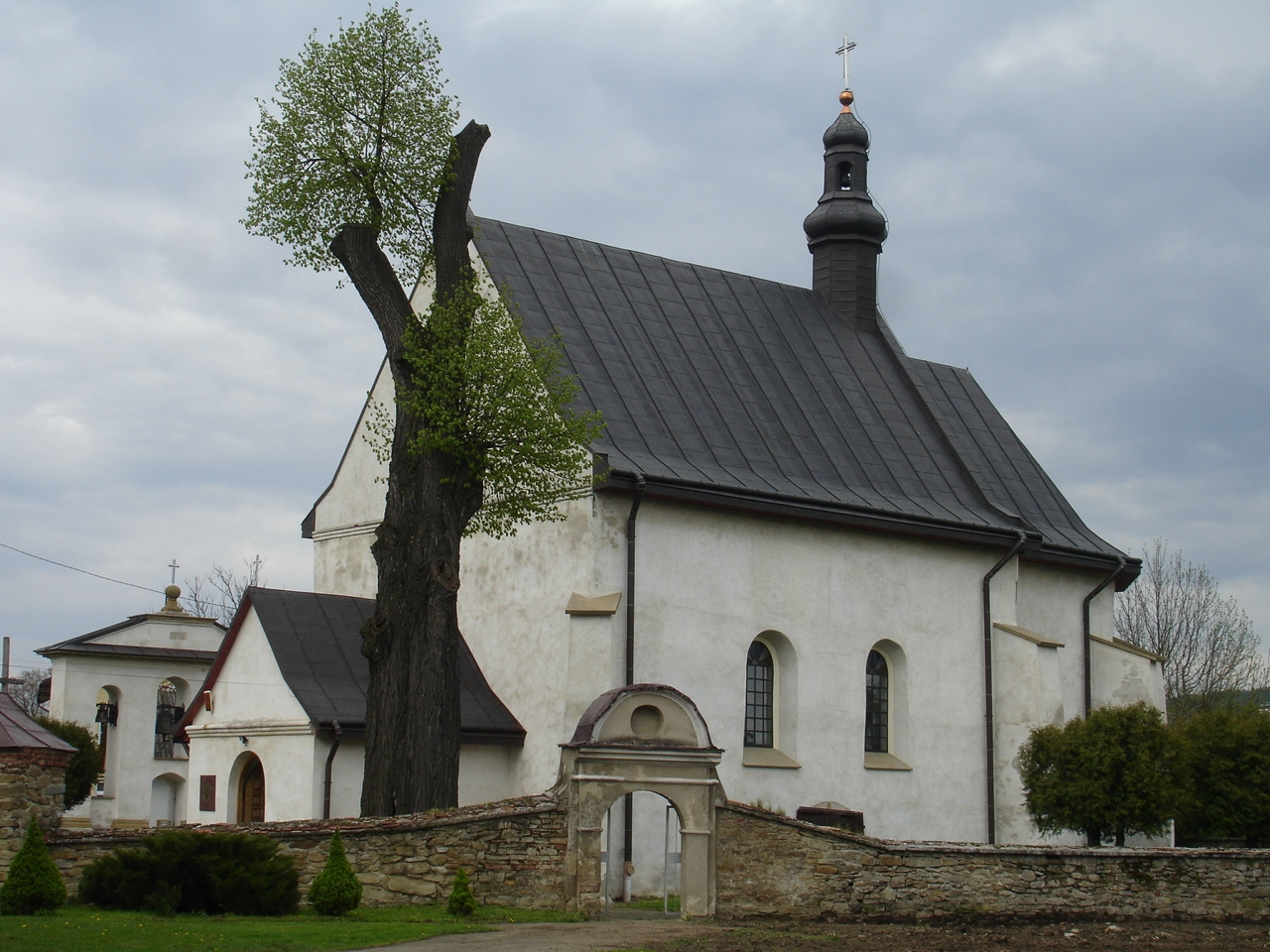

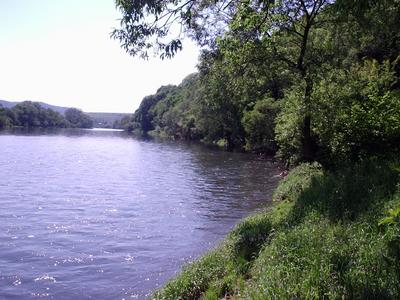

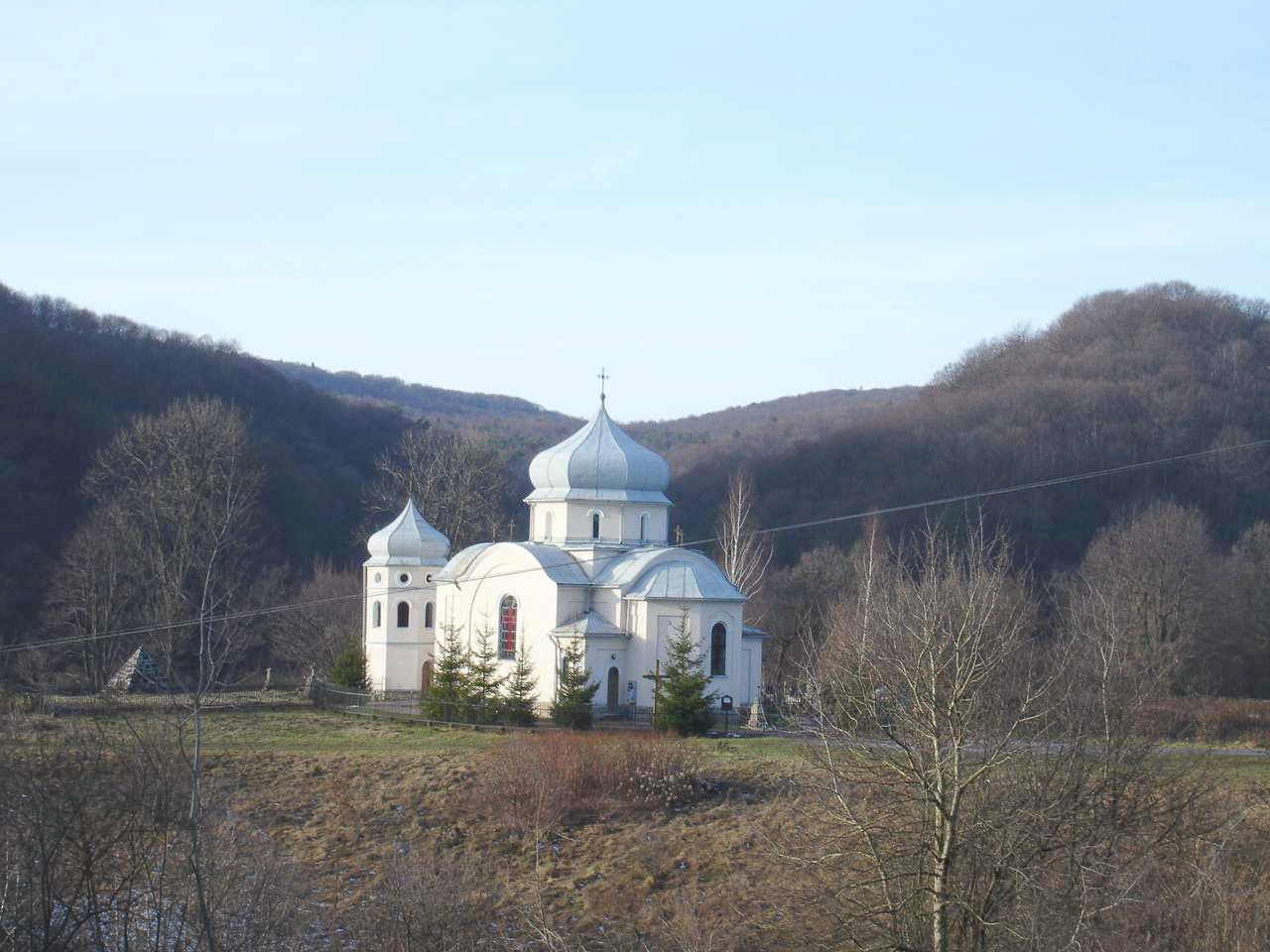

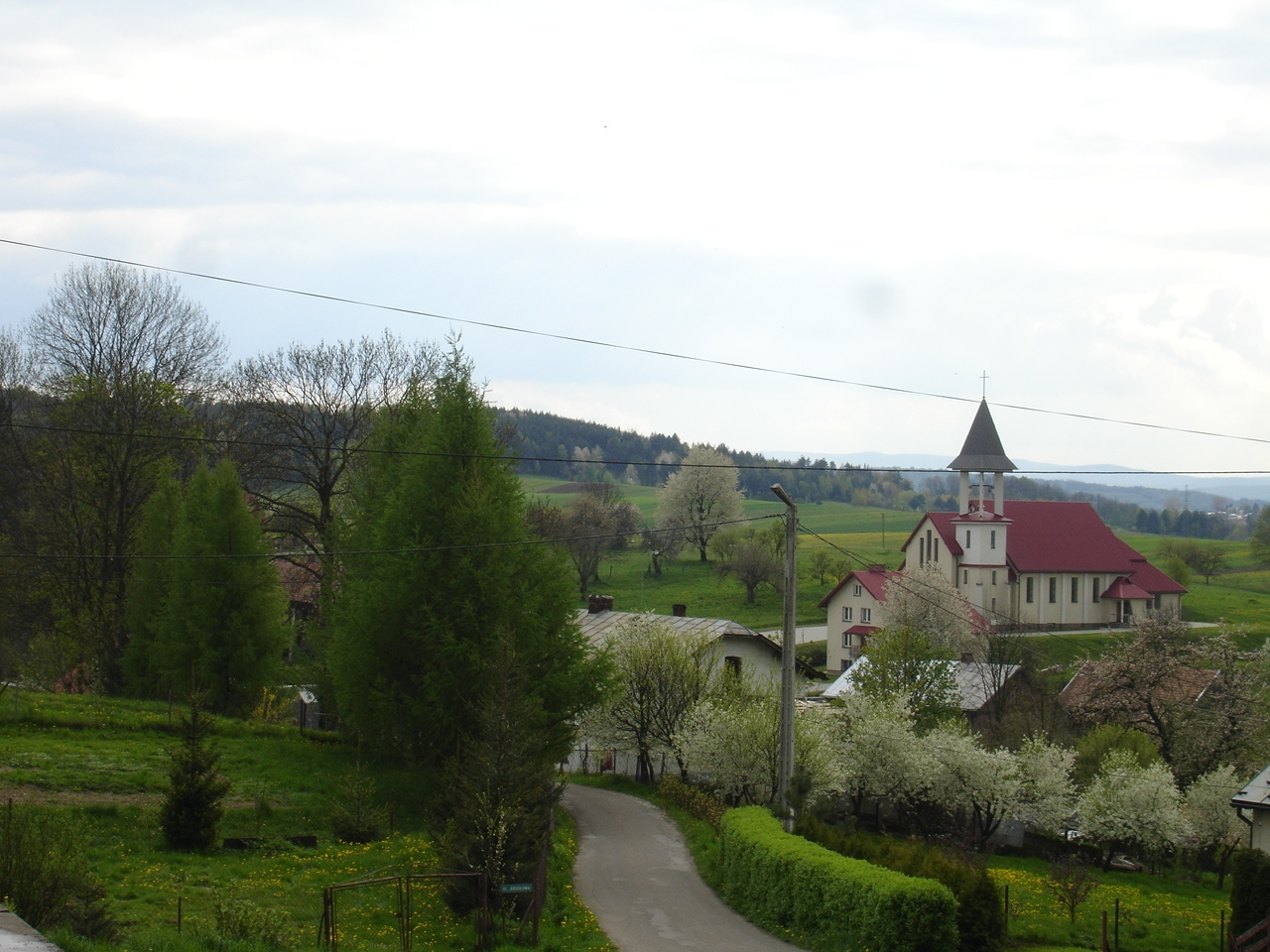

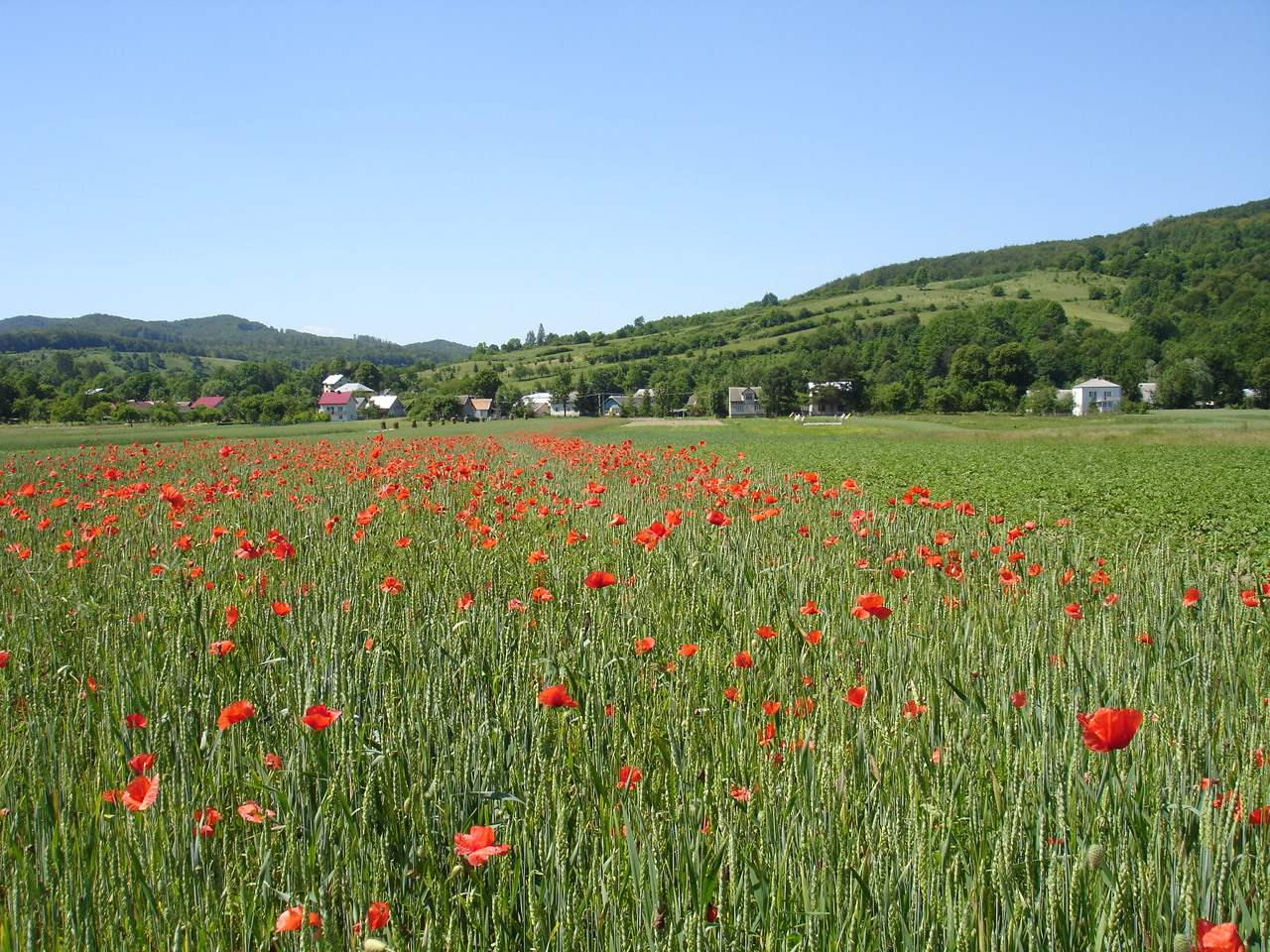

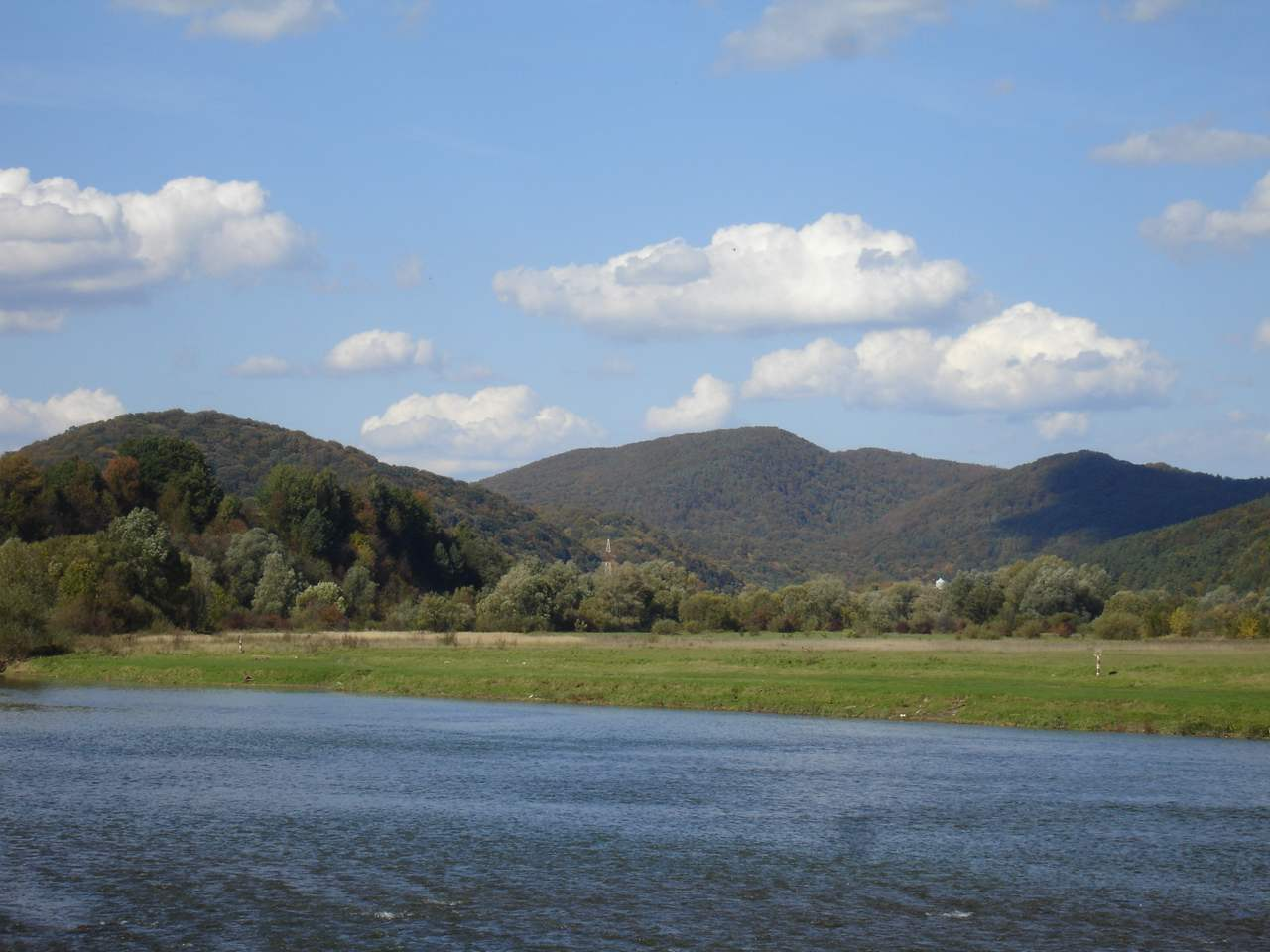

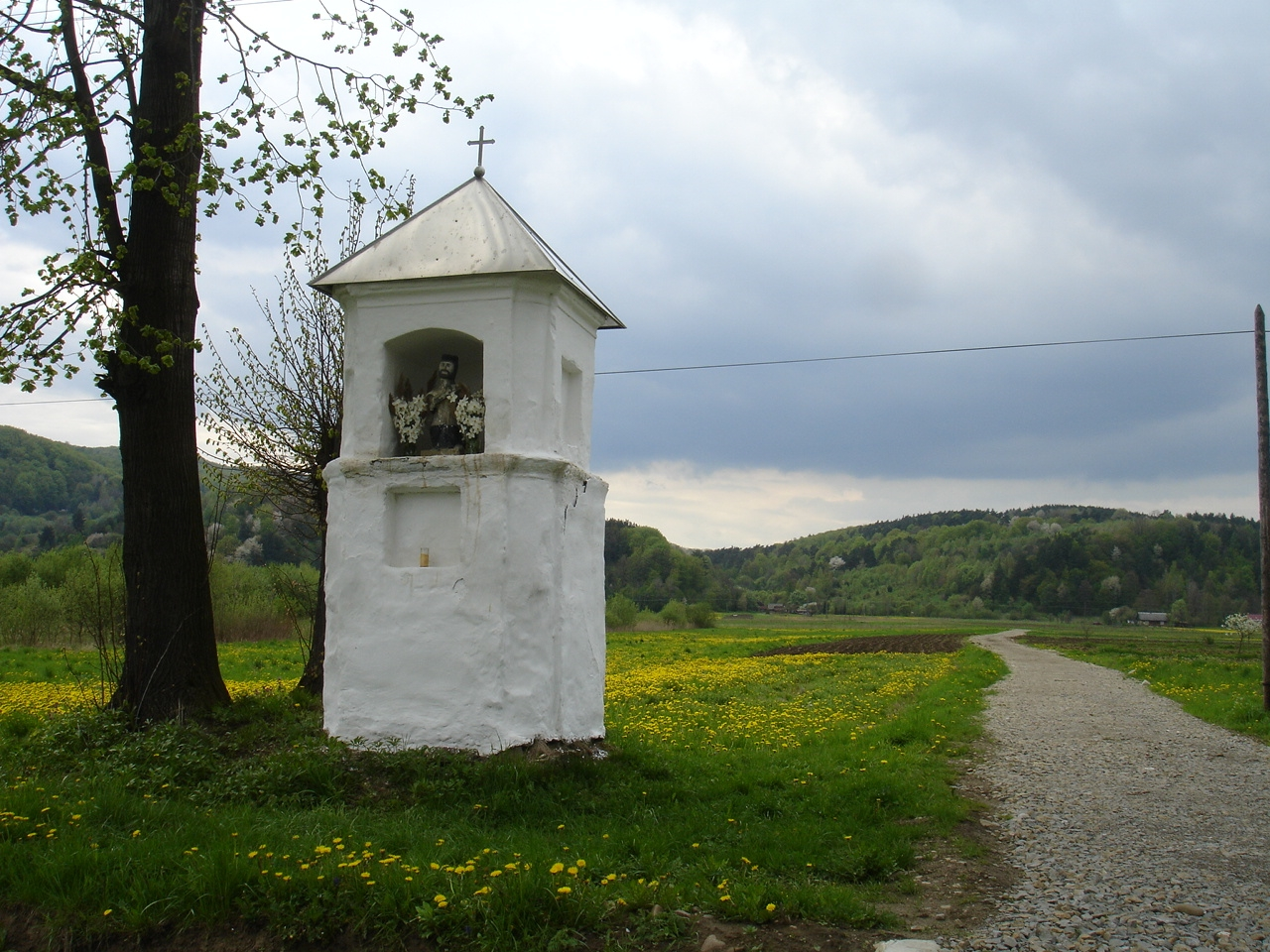

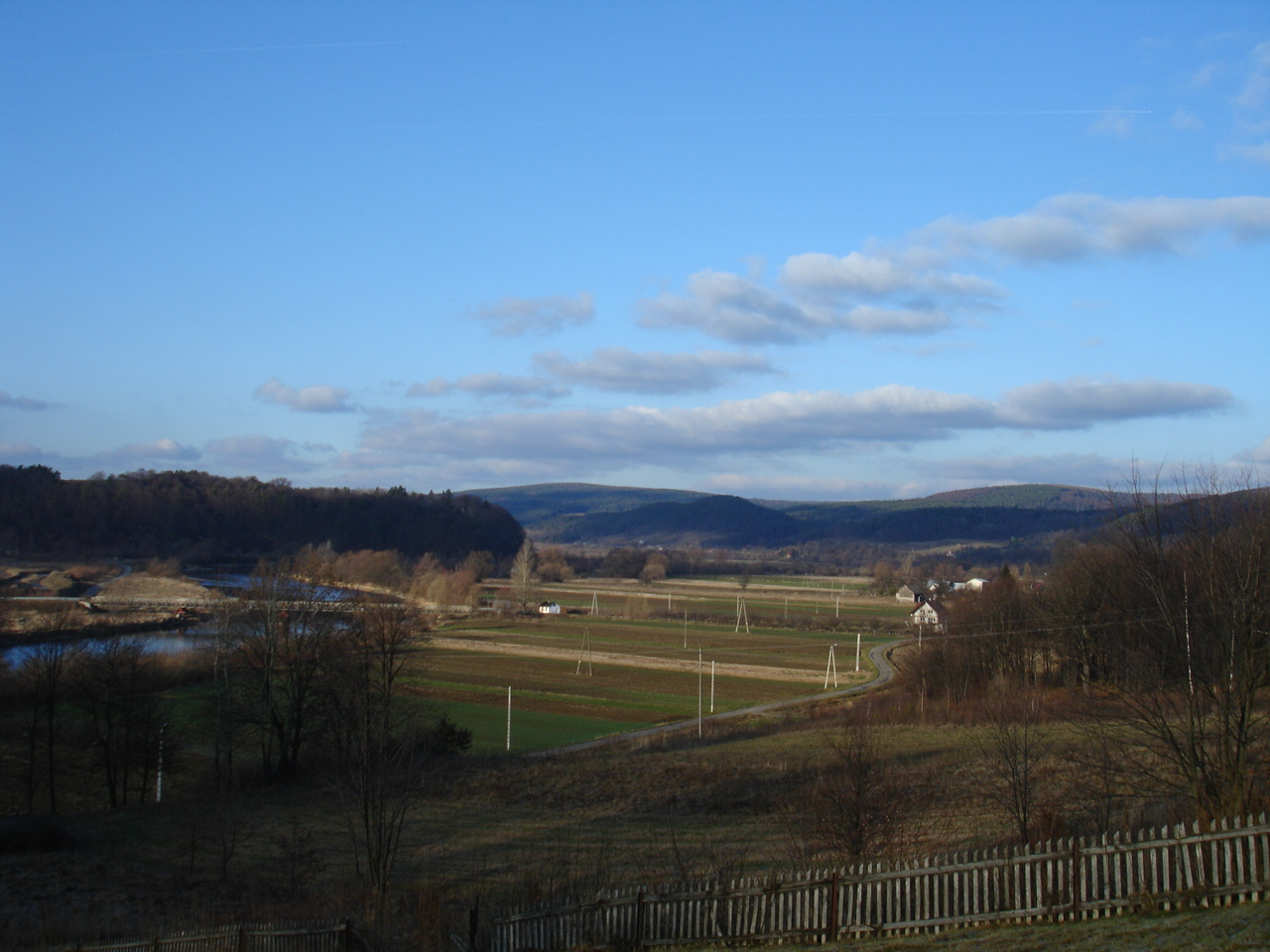
