= Jędruszkowce =

- Village
- Location within Poland
- Coordinates: 49°34′N 22°5′E
- Country: Poland
- Voivodeship: Subcarpathian
- County: Sanok
- Gmina: Sanok
- Population: 210

Jędruszkowce [jɛndruʂˈkɔft͡sɛ] is a village in the administrative district of Gmina Sanok, within Sanok County, Subcarpathian Voivodeship, in south-eastern Poland.
