= Jurowce, Podkarpackie Voivodeship =

Jurowce
- Village
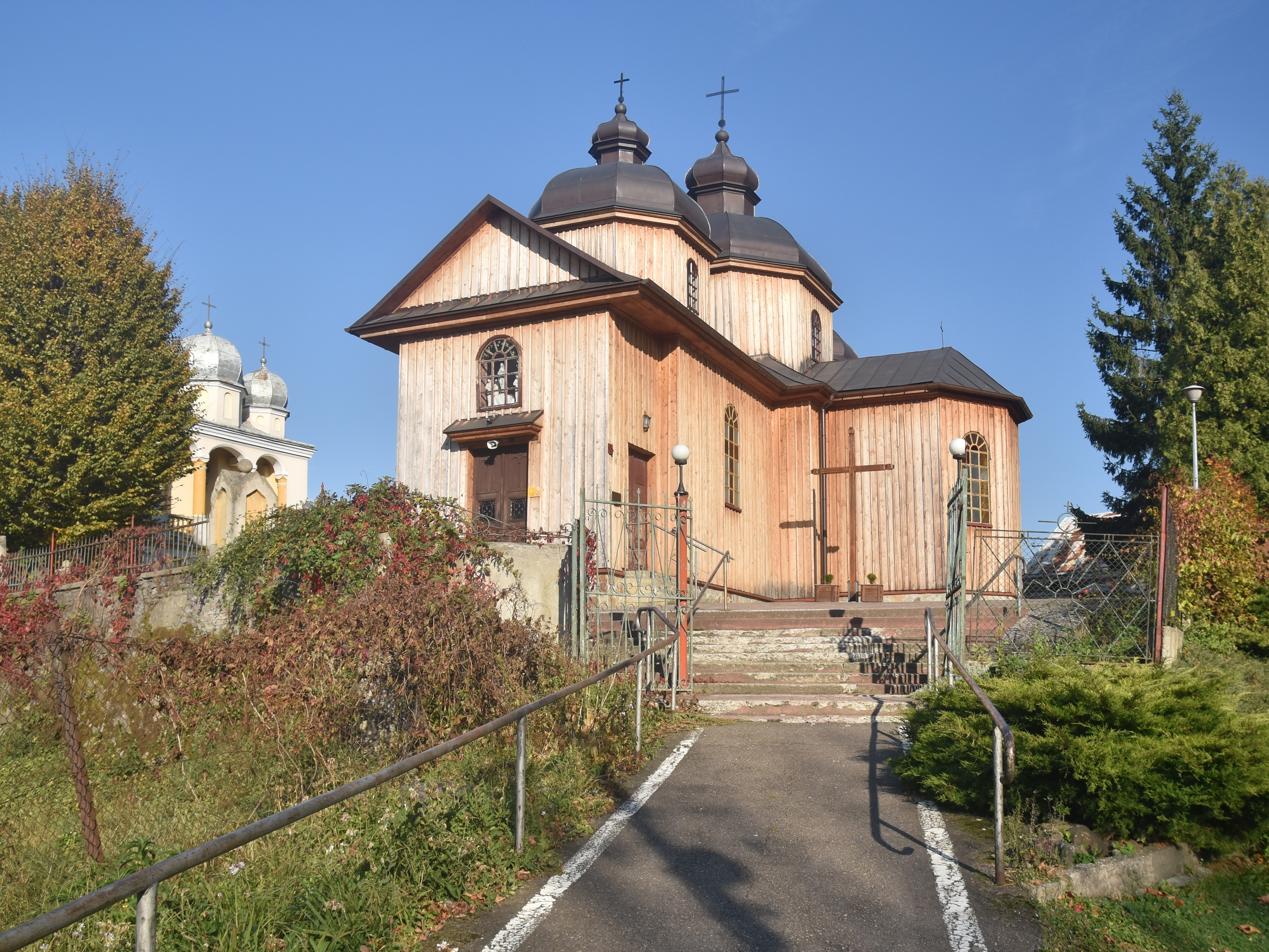
- Church of Saints Peter and Paul

- Location within Poland
- Coordinates: 49°35′52″N 22°8′9″E
- Country: Poland
- Voivodeship: Subcarpathian
- County: Sanok
- Gmina: Sanok

Population
  - Total: 420

Jurowce [juˈrɔft͡sɛ] is a village in the administrative district of Gmina Sanok, within Sanok County, Subcarpathian Voivodeship, in south-eastern Poland.
