= Josaphat Kotsylovsky =

Ukrainian Greek Catholic bishop and martyr

Blessed Josaphat Kotsylovsky OSBM
- Eparch of Przemyśl
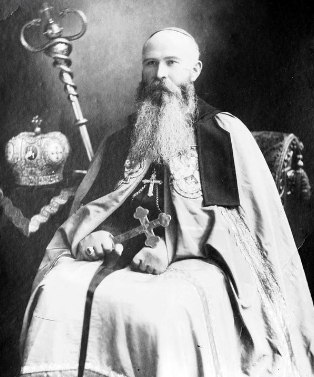
- Church: Ukrainian Greek Catholic
- Appointed: 29 January 1917
- Term ended: 17 November 1947
- Predecessor: Konstantyn Chekhovych
- Successor: Ivan Choma (in exile)

Orders
- Ordination: 9 October 1907 (priest)
- Consecration: 23 September 1917 (bishop) by Andrey Sheptytsky, Hryhoriy Khomyshyn, and Dionyz Njaradi

Personal details
- Born: 3 March 1876 Pakoszowka, Kingdom of Galicia and Lodomeria, Austria-Hungary
- Died: 17 November 1947 (aged 71) near Kiev, Ukrainian SSR, Soviet Union

Sainthood
- Beatified: 27 June 2001 by Pope John Paul II

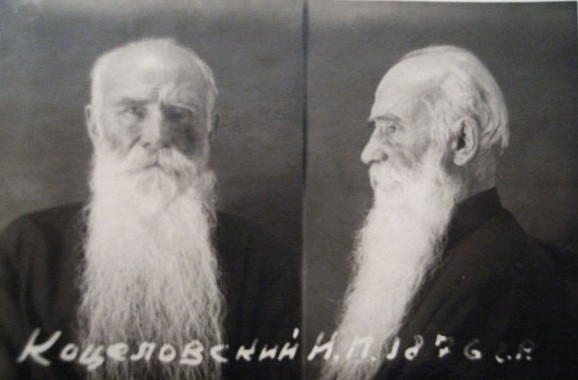
Josaphat Kotsylovsky after arrest by NKVD 1946

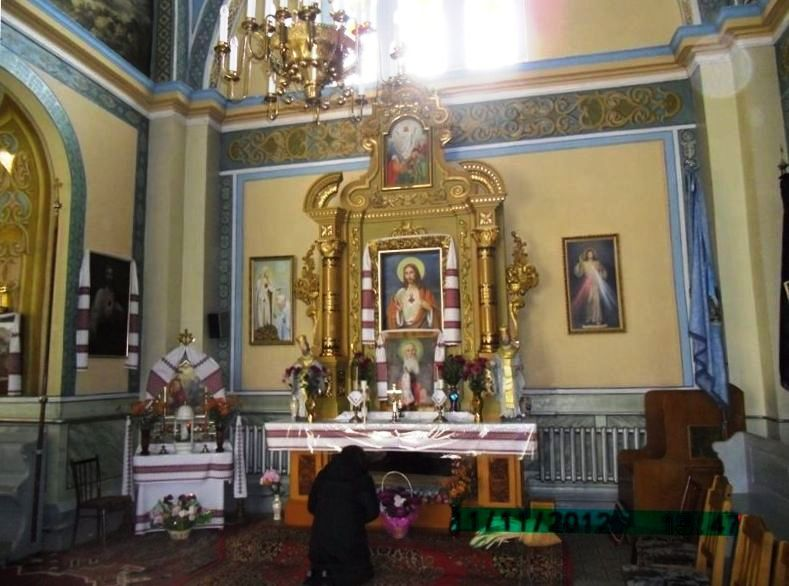
Stryi. The relics of the blessed of Josaphat Kotsylovsky.

Josaphat Joseph Kotsylovsky OSBM (Ukrainian: Йосафат Йосиф Коциловський; 3 March 1876 – 17 November 1947) was a bishop and martyr of the Ukrainian Greek Catholic Church. He was the bishop of the Ukrainian Catholic Archeparchy of Przemyśl–Warsaw from 1917 to 1947.

== Biography ==
Kotsylovsky was born 3 March 1876 in the village of Pakoszowka (then Austria-Hungary, now Poland), of the Lemko Region, Sianok district. Kotsylovsky was of Lemko origin, and Ukrainian national orientation.

After graduating from the elementary folk school in Lesko he studied at the Sanok and Sambir gymnasia. From 1896 he studied at the law department of Lviv University. Soon he interrupted the studies and graduated from the school of artillery in Vienna, and in 1900 he was sent to serve in the Lviv garrison. After leaving the military service, and with the assistance of the Przemysl Bishop Kostyantyn Chekhovych, he began the philosophical and theological studies in Rome. He studied theology in Rome and graduated in 1907, later that year on 9 October he was ordained to the priesthood. Soon after, he was made vice-rector and professor of theology at the Greek-Catholic seminary in Stanislaviv.

On 2 October 1911 he entered the Order of Saint Basil the Great. Kotsylovsky became a professed member on 16 May 1913 and took his solemn vows on 13 June 1916. On 23 September 1917 Kotsylovsky was ordained bishop in Przemyśl (Poland) by Andrey Sheptytsky. As bishop, he worked to improve the church's educational system and supported monastic orders. He also took steps to combat the rising Russophile movement by appointing Ukrainian priests and funding Ukrainian language journals.

On 10 July 1941 he welcomed the Wehrmacht forces entering Przemyśl. On 4 July 1943 Kotsylovsky led a Mass in the name of the volunteers entering the 14th SS Division.

At the end of World War II, Communist Poland assisted the Soviet Union with the liquidation of the Ukrainian Greek Catholic Church. In September 1945 the Polish security service arrested Kotsylovsky, then released him and arrested him again in 1946. They then handed him over to the Soviet security service. He died on 17 November 1947 in a prison camp near Kyiv.

He was beatified by Pope John Paul II on 27 June 2001.

The relics of Josaphat Kotsylovsky are kept in the church of the Annunciation of the Blessed Virgin Mary in Stryi.

=== Testimony of Father Josaphat Kavatsiv ===
Josaphat Kavatsiv states a second hand account of Bishop Josaphat Kotsylovskyi martyrdom as following:

"I came to the Protection Monastery and the hegumena [prioress] told me the story. When Bishop Kotsylovskyi was arrested, their Orthodox bishop of Kyiv was arrested at the same time. When they brought a package to Chapaievka, the Orthodox bishop said: 'Uniate Bishop Josaphat Kotsylovskyi is confined in the same camp with me.' And he asked these nuns, if they could, to bring a package to Bishop Josaphat as well. So they brought packages- one for each of the bishops... Once when she brought a package, the bishop said that Kotsylovskyi had died. And he asked her, because the dead were all thrown into one hole, if they could borrow some money or get some money somewhere. He asked her 'to bury him in a separate grave, because this was a holy man.'"

== See also ==
- Йосафат (Коциловський)
