= Niebieszczany =

- Village
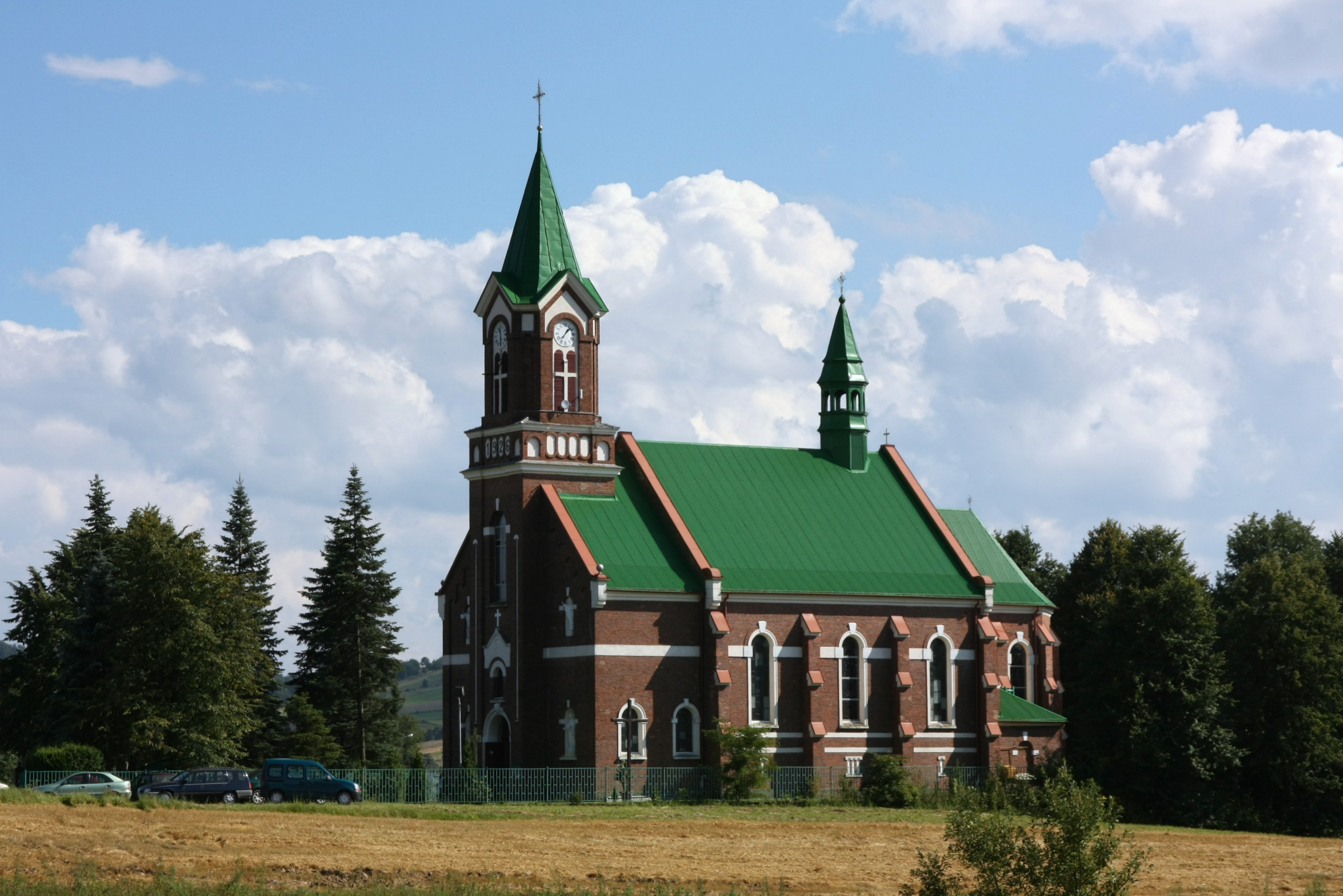
- Saint Nicholas church

- Location within Poland
- Coordinates: 49°30′24″N 22°09′13″E
- Country: Poland
- Voivodeship: Subcarpathian
- County: Sanok
- Gmina: Sanok
- Population: 2,100

Niebieszczany [ɲɛbʲɛʂˈt͡ʂanɨ] is a village in the administrative district of Gmina Sanok, within Sanok County, Subcarpathian Voivodeship, in south-eastern Poland.

In 2006 the village had 2,500 inhabitants and 491 houses.

Integral parts of the village of Niebiesczcany
SIMC	Name	Type
0359445	Dwór/Court	part of the village
0359451	Łazy/Łazy	part of the village
0359468	Pod Dębiną/Under the Oak Tree	part of the village

== History ==
A village in the Bukowskie Foothills, mentioned as early as 1376 as Najna or Nana, was then granted a royal charter under Magdeburg Law in 1430 by Frederick of Meissen. About 1440 a wooden church was built, and in 1445 a parish was established. The first owner of the village was Frederick Myssnar of Meissen. In 1460, a church was founded by Frederick Jaćmirski Myssnar of Meissen, a sword-bearer of Sanok and owner of Jaćmierz and Niebieszczany. He was followed by his sons Mikołaj, Jan (a Lviv steward), and Leonard (of Pobiedno, a Sanok soldier), who used the Niebieszczany surname. In 1461, Jan Myssnar Jaćmirski, owner of the local fortified manor, endowed the parish in Niebieszczany with further grants.

After the Jaćmirskis, the village was owned by the Drohojowski family, Protestants, who converted the church into a Calvinist congregation in the second half of the 16th century. The church in Niebiesczcany survived until 1621, when, by a royal court judgment in Lublin, the Drohojowski family was forced to give the church back to the Catholics.

In 1712, a second wooden church was built, consecrated by the Bishop of Przemyśl, Wacław Hiernim Sierakowski., in 1745. In 1895 the church underwent renovations, and was demolished in 1926, after the current brick church, built in the neo-Gothic style, was consecrated. The church features a 17th-century main altar, which was transferred from the old wooden church and renovated in 1972 by Stanisław Filip and Maciej Kauczyński. The church also contains 18th-century side altars and a 15th-century stone baptismal font. Other surviving artifacts from the old church include a crucifix from the second quarter of the 15th-century and late Baroque sculptures.

Throughout the 19th century, until 1939, the majority of the land belonged to the Truskolaski and Wiktor families.

In the winter of 1846 the village took an active part in the Galician massacre.

In the summer of 1885, the Niebieszczany estate was purchased by Józef Wiktor for 145,000 zlotys from Kornel and Eleonora Dauksz. At the end of the 19th century, the tabular owner of the estate in the village was his wife Adela Wiktor. in 1905, their son Kazimierz Wiktor owned an area of 599.7 ha in the village.

In the Second Polish Republic, a village in Sanok County, Lviv Voivodeship. During World War II, the 5th Home Army Outpost operated in Niebieszczany, part of the Sanok District. Its commander, until his arrest in June 1944, was Seargeant Władysław Szelka, codename "Czajka (Lapwing)," "Borsuk (Badger)," and later Jerzy Jasiński, codename "Kadłubek (Hull)." On the night of October 20–21, 1946, Ukrainian nationalists from the OUN-UPA murdered six Poles here. Two Polish Army soldiers died defending the civilian population.

In the period 1945-1946, Niebieszczany housed the headquarters of the anti-communist Independent Operational Battalion of the National Armed Forces, codenamed "Zuch (Brave)," subordinated to Department III, District Command VII (Kraków), whose commander was Captain Antoni Żubryd.

One of the oldest rural housewives' associations has been operating continuously since 1926.

During the Administrative Division of Poland from 1975-1998, the town administratively belonged to the Krosno Voivodeship.

From 1954-1972, the village was the seat of the Gmina Niebieszczany. Between February 1 and April 1, 1977, it was a part of the Gmina Zagórz.

There is currently a primary school in the village attended by approximately 400 students.

In 2010-2011, a 4.8 km deep exporation well for hydrocarbons, called Niebieszczany-1, was drilled in Niebiesczcany.

== Archeology ==
On the former Morawski estate are the remains of earthworks (ramparts and bastions) of an unknown fortress and the remains of a 19th century manor house. Archaeological research conducted here in 1972 unearthed objects dating back to the 16th-17th centuries.

== Population ==
- In 1900, the village had 1,782 inhabitants, with a total area of 1,328 hectares.
- In 1937, the parish had 2,243 Roman Catholics (including: Niebieszczany – 1,896, Prusiek – 343), 470 Greek Catholics, and 8 Jews. [Information taken from Parish of St. Nicholas the Bishop in Niebieszczany]
- In March, 2021 the population is listed at 2,170.

== Religion ==
- Parish of St. Nicholas in Niebieszczany

=== Parish Priests ===
- 1786-1806: Priest Józef Ćwiąkalski.
- 1807-1812: Priest Clement Brant.
- 1812-1815: Priest Jakub Banasiewicz.
- 1815-1820: Priest Antoni Żeromski.
- 1820-1822: Priest Mikołaj Guzikowski.
- 1822-1824: Prince Wawrzyniec Umański. [Sic.] [Information taken from Parish of St. Nicholas the Bishop in Niebieszczany Possibly a translation error.]
- 1824-1837: Priest Marcin Kaliński.
- 1837-1855: Father Andrzej Weni.
- 1855-1895: Priest Karol Biber.
- 1895-1906: Priest Stanisław Malinowski.
- 1906: Father Bronisław Stasicki (ex currendo administrator)
- 1907-1912: Priest Roman Bauer.
- 1912-1926: Father Antoni Dożyński.
- 1926-1945: Father Jan Biały.
- 1945-1970: Father Władysław Orzechowski
- 1970-2000: Priest Edward Bojda
- 2000-2012: Father Henryk Dobosz.
- 2012-2016: Father Jacek Szular.
- 2016–present: Father Janusz Dudziak.

== Other Source Information ==
- Przemysław Dąbkowski . Church Relations in the Sanok Region in the 15th Century. Lviv 1922.
- Przemysław Dąbkowski. Fryderyk Jaćmirski, sword-bearer of Sanok. Lviv 1922
- Adam Fastnacht . Historical and Geographical Dictionary of the Sanok Region in the Middle Ages
