= Raczkowa, Podkarpackie Voivodeship =

Raczkowa
- Village
- Location within Poland
- Coordinates: 49°39′N 22°11′E
- Country: Poland
- Voivodeship: Subcarpathian
- County: Sanok
- Gmina: Sanok

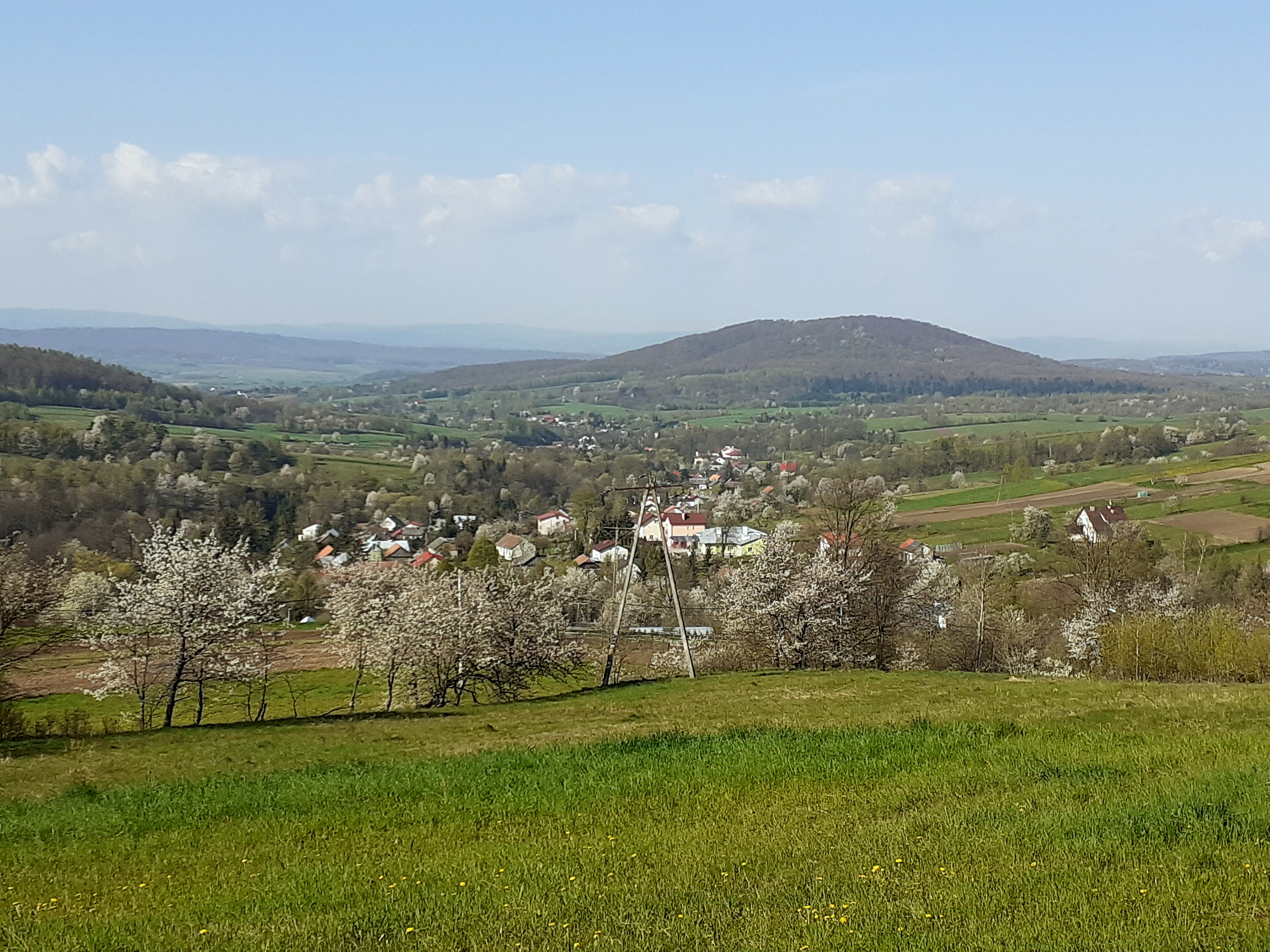
Raczkowa, Poland

Raczkowa [rat͡ʂˈkɔva] is a village in the administrative district of Gmina Sanok, within Sanok County, Subcarpathian Voivodeship, in south-eastern Poland.
