= Falejówka =

- Village
- Location within Poland
- Coordinates: 49°38′N 22°10′E
- Country: Poland
- Voivodeship: Subcarpathian
- County: Sanok
- Gmina: Sanok
- Population: 600
- Website: http://falejowka.pl/

Falejówka [falɛˈjufka] is a village in the administrative district of Gmina Sanok, within Sanok County, Subcarpathian Voivodeship, in south-eastern Poland.
