= Hłomcza =

- Village
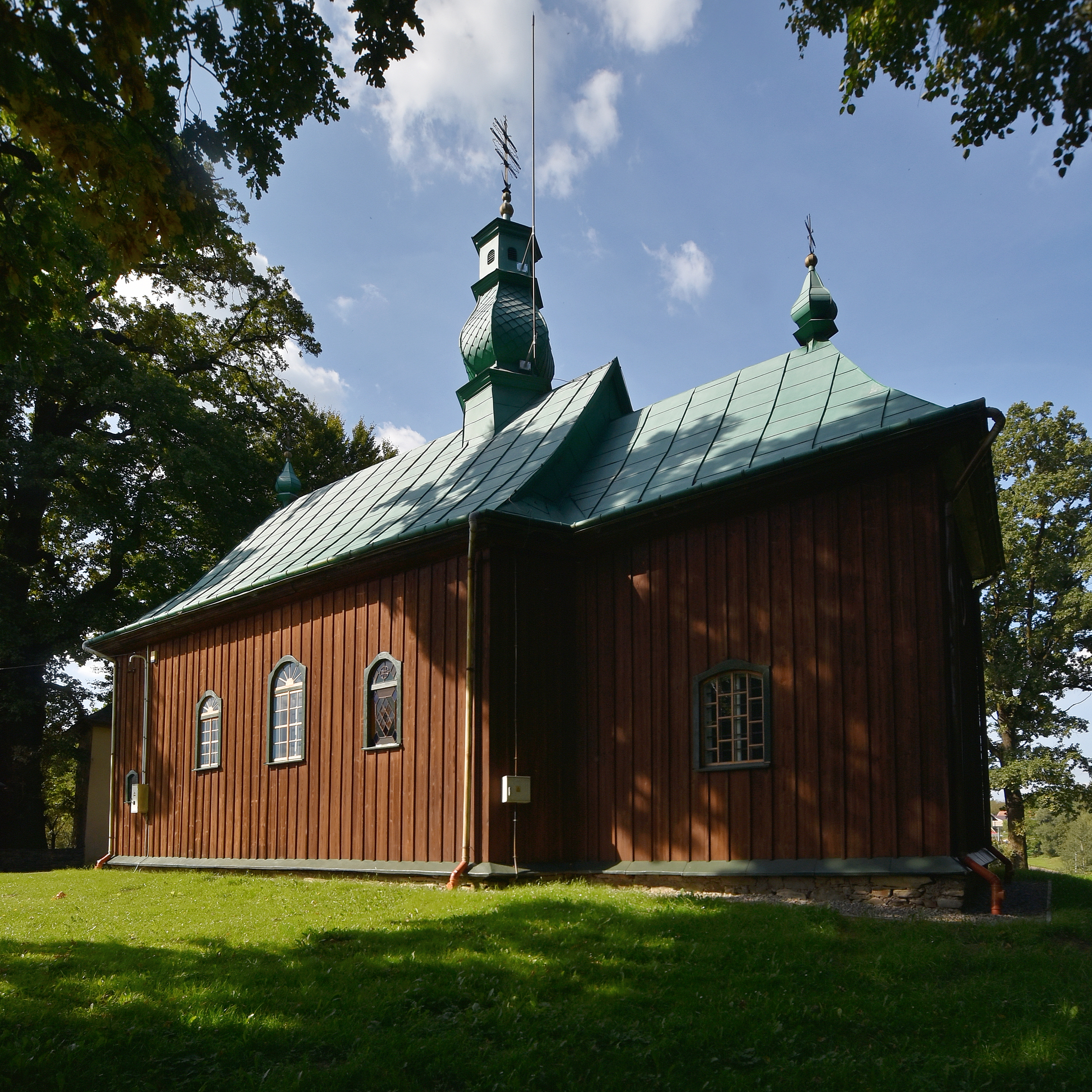
- Greek Catholic church

- Location within Poland
- Coordinates: 49°38′7″N 22°16′44″E
- Country: Poland
- Voivodeship: Subcarpathian
- County: Sanok
- Gmina: Sanok

Population
  - Total: 310

Hłomcza [ˈxwɔmt͡ʂa] is a village in the administrative district of Gmina Sanok, within Sanok County, Subcarpathian Voivodeship, in south-eastern Poland.
