= Płowce, Podkarpackie Voivodeship =

Płowce
- Village
- Location within Poland
- Coordinates: 49°32′42″N 22°10′17″E
- Country: Poland
- Voivodeship: Subcarpathian
- County: Sanok
- Gmina: Sanok

Płowce [ˈpwɔft͡sɛ] is a village in the administrative district of Gmina Sanok, within Sanok County, Subcarpathian Voivodeship, in south-eastern Poland.
