= Mrzygłód =

- Village
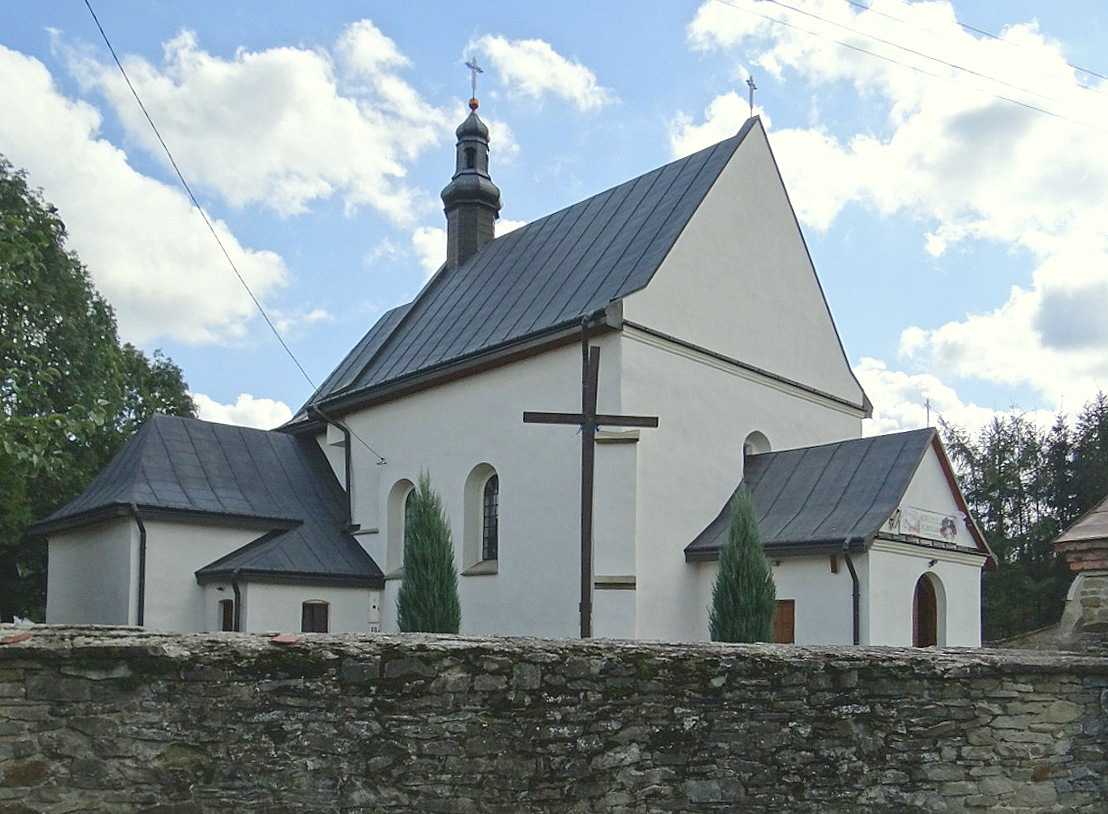
- Church of the Mission of the Saint Apostles

- Location within Poland
- Coordinates: 49°37′09″N 22°16′21″E
- Country: Poland
- Voivodeship: Subcarpathian
- County: Sanok
- Gmina: Sanok

Population
  - Total: 412

Mrzygłód is a village in the administrative district of Gmina Sanok, within Sanok County, Subcarpathian Voivodeship, in south-eastern Poland.

Mrzygłód obtained town status in 1428, but it was downgraded before 1919.

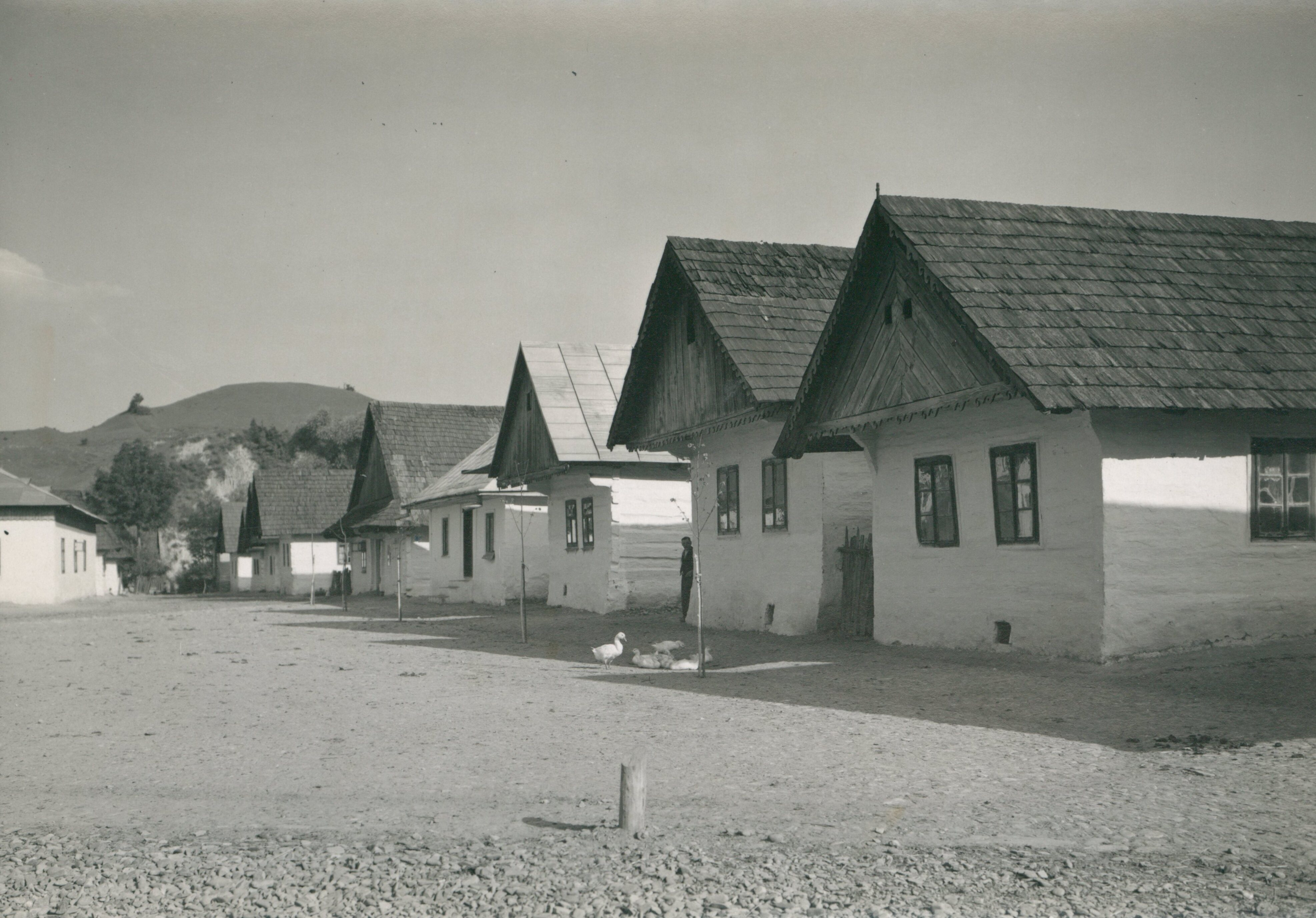
Houses at the market square in the 1930s
