= Bykowce =

- Village
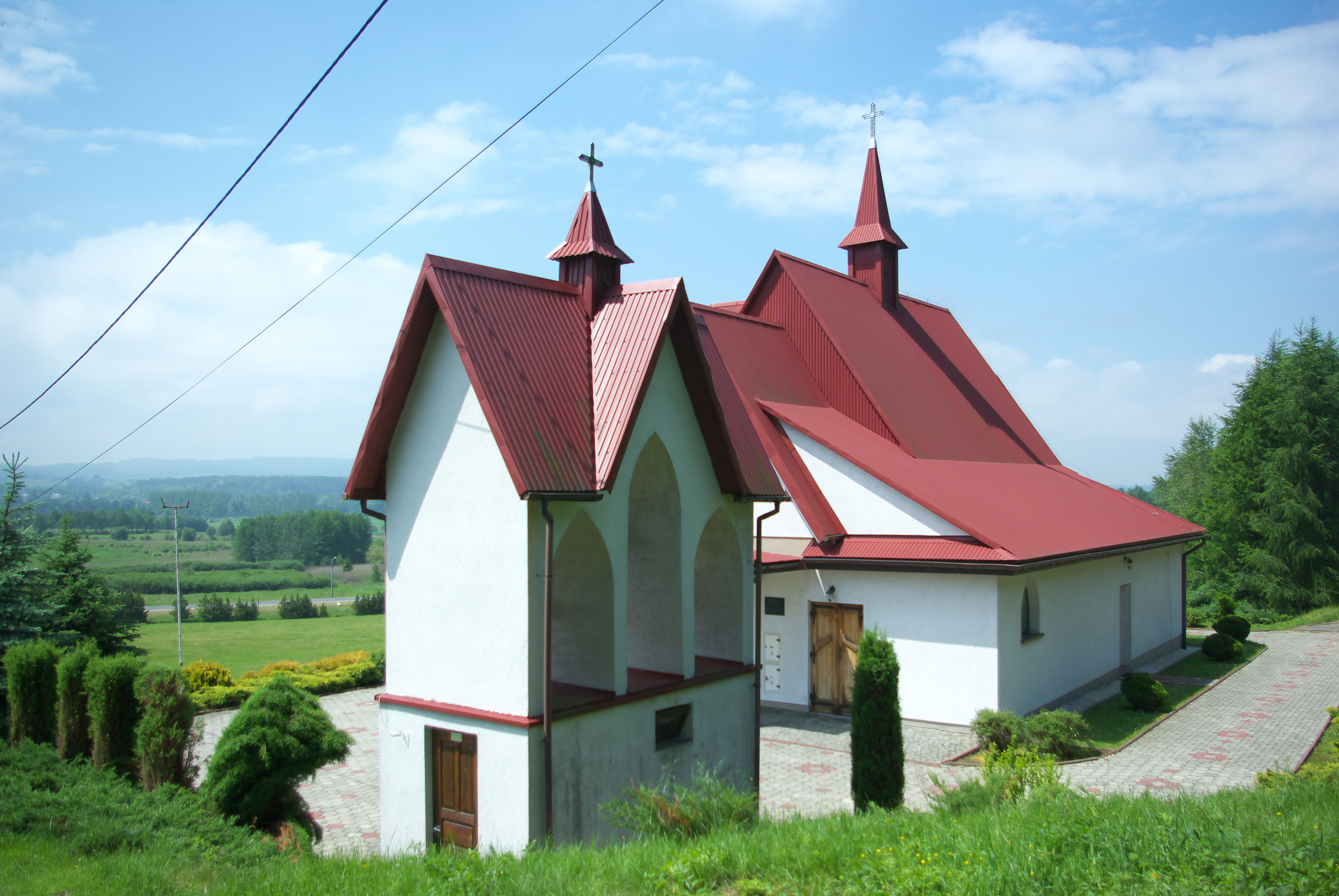
- Church of the Immaculate Heart of the Virgin Mary

- Location within Poland
- Coordinates: 49°32′37″N 22°16′32″E
- Country: Poland
- Voivodeship: Subcarpathian
- County: Sanok
- Gmina: Sanok

Population
  - Total: 470
- Time zone: UTC+1 (CET)
  - Summer (DST): UTC+2 (CEST)
- Vehicle registration: RSA
- Website: http://www.bykowce.pl

Bykowce [bɨˈkɔft͡sɛ] is a village in the administrative district of Gmina Sanok, within Sanok County, Subcarpathian Voivodeship, in south-eastern Poland.

Five Polish citizens were murdered by Nazi Germany in the village during World War II.
