= Kostarowce =

- Village
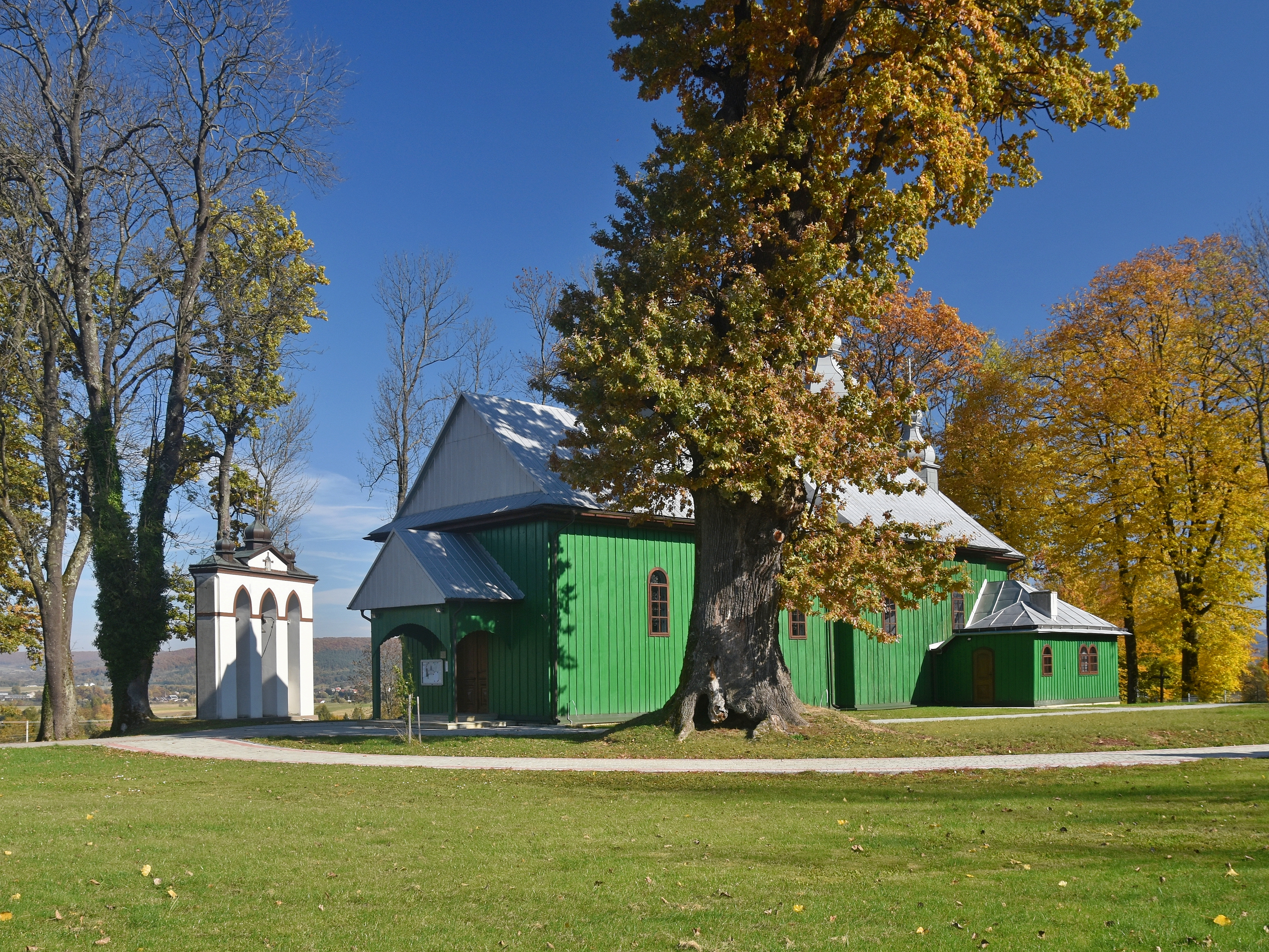
- Church of the Nativity of the Virgin Mary

- Location within Poland
- Coordinates: 49°35′N 22°6′E
- Country: Poland
- Voivodeship: Subcarpathian
- County: Sanok
- Gmina: Sanok
- Elevation: 346 m (1,135 ft)

Population
  - Total: 720

Kostarowce [kɔstaˈrɔft͡sɛ] is a village in the administrative district of Gmina Sanok, within Sanok County, Subcarpathian Voivodeship, in south-eastern Poland.
