= Słonne Mountains Landscape Park =

Protected area in Subcarpathian Voivodeship, Poland

Coordinates: 49°37′N 22°14′E

- Park Krajobrazowy Gór Słonnych
- IUCN category V (protected landscape/seascape)
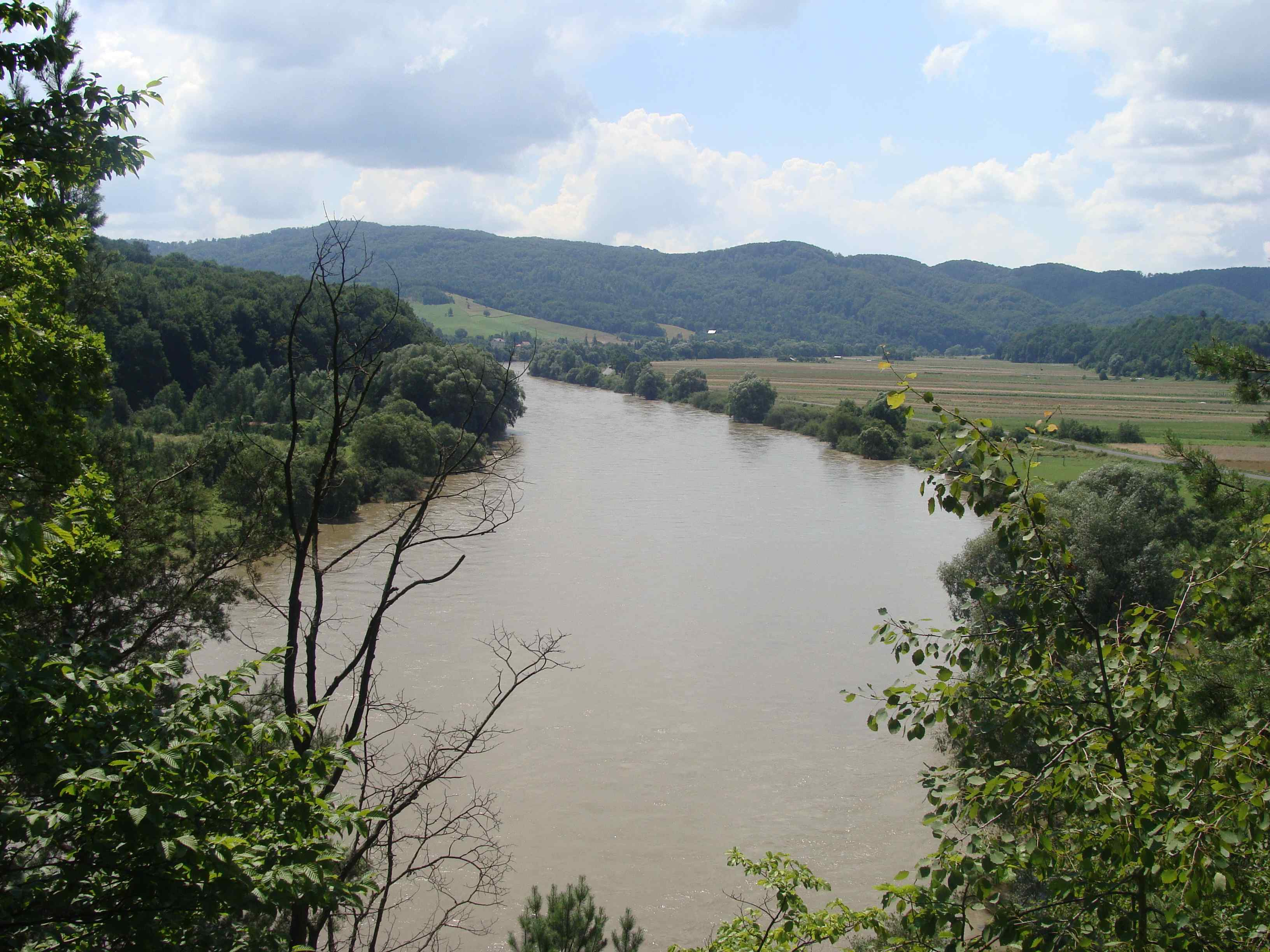
- Slonne Mountain Valley View near Sanok as seen from Dębna
- Interactive map of Słonne Mountains Landscape Park
- Location: Subcarpathian Voivodeship
- Area: 513.92 km^{2} (198.43 sq mi)
- Established: 1992

Słonne Mountains Landscape Park (Park Krajobrazowy Gór Słonnych) is a protected area (Landscape Park) in south-eastern Poland, established in 1992, covering an area of 513.92 square kilometres (198.43 sq mi). It lies in the Słonne Mountains (Polish: Góry Słonne, literally "salt (brine) mountains") in the Eastern Carpathians (Carpathian Plateau).

Administratively the Park is within Subcarpathian Voivodeship: in Bieszczady County (Gmina Ustrzyki Dolne), Lesko County (Gmina Lesko, Gmina Olszanica) and Sanok County (Gmina Sanok, Gmina Tyrawa Wołoska).

Within the Landscape Park are nine nature reserves.
