= Prusiek =

- Village
- Location within Poland
- Coordinates: 49°32′N 22°8′E
- Country: Poland
- Voivodeship: Subcarpathian
- County: Sanok
- Gmina: Sanok
- Population: 700

Prusiek [ˈpruɕɛk] is a village in the administrative district of Gmina Sanok, within Sanok County, Subcarpathian Voivodeship, in south-eastern Poland.
