= Międzybrodzie =

- Village
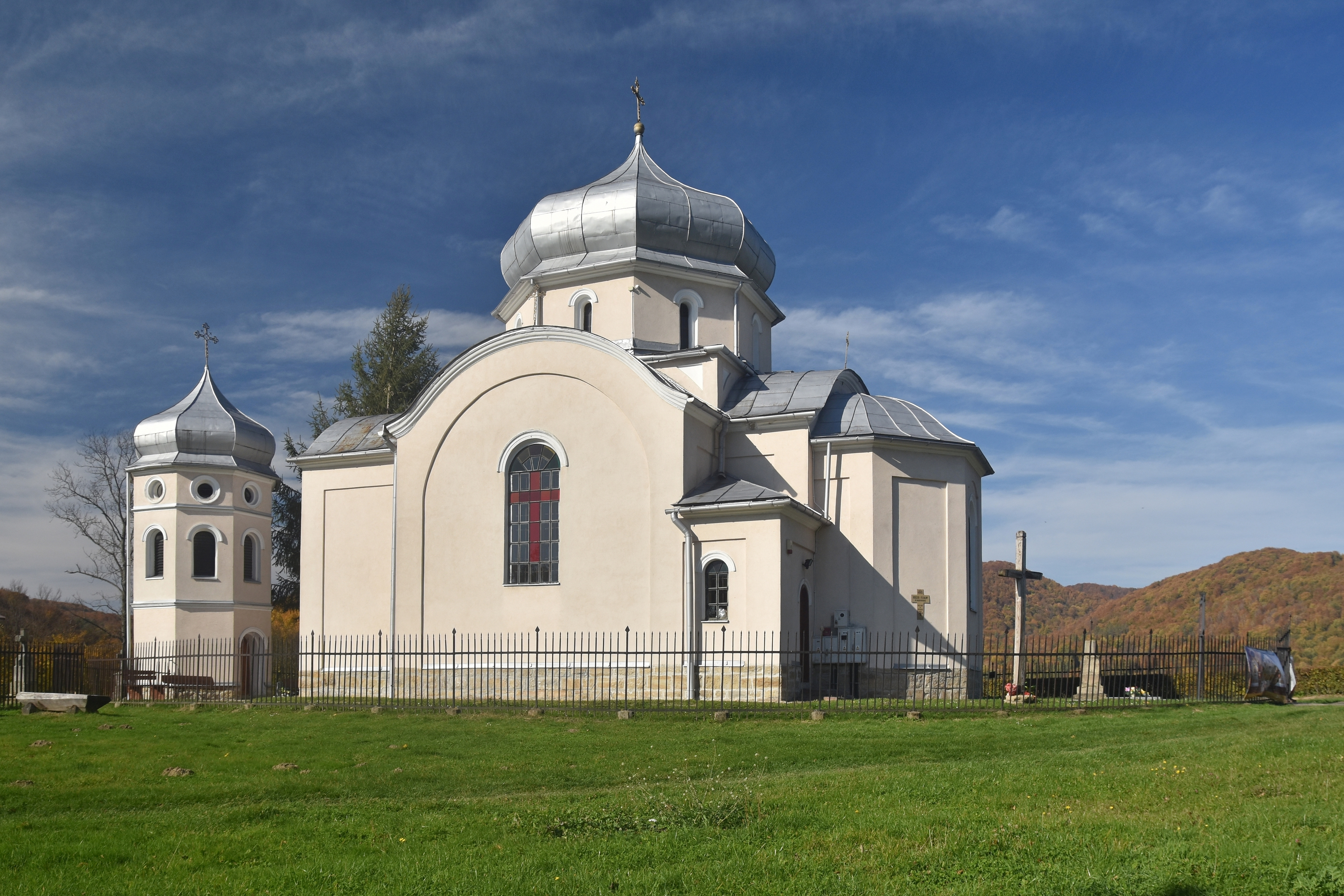
- Church of Holy Trinity

- Location within Poland
- Coordinates: 49°36′N 22°11′E
- Country: Poland
- Voivodeship: Subcarpathian
- County: Sanok
- Gmina: Sanok

Population
  - Total: 100

Międzybrodzie [mʲɛnd͡zɨˈbrɔd͡ʑɛ] is a village in the administrative district of Gmina Sanok, within Sanok County, Subcarpathian Voivodeship, in south-eastern Poland.
