= Sanoczek, Podkarpackie Voivodeship =

Sanoczek
- Village
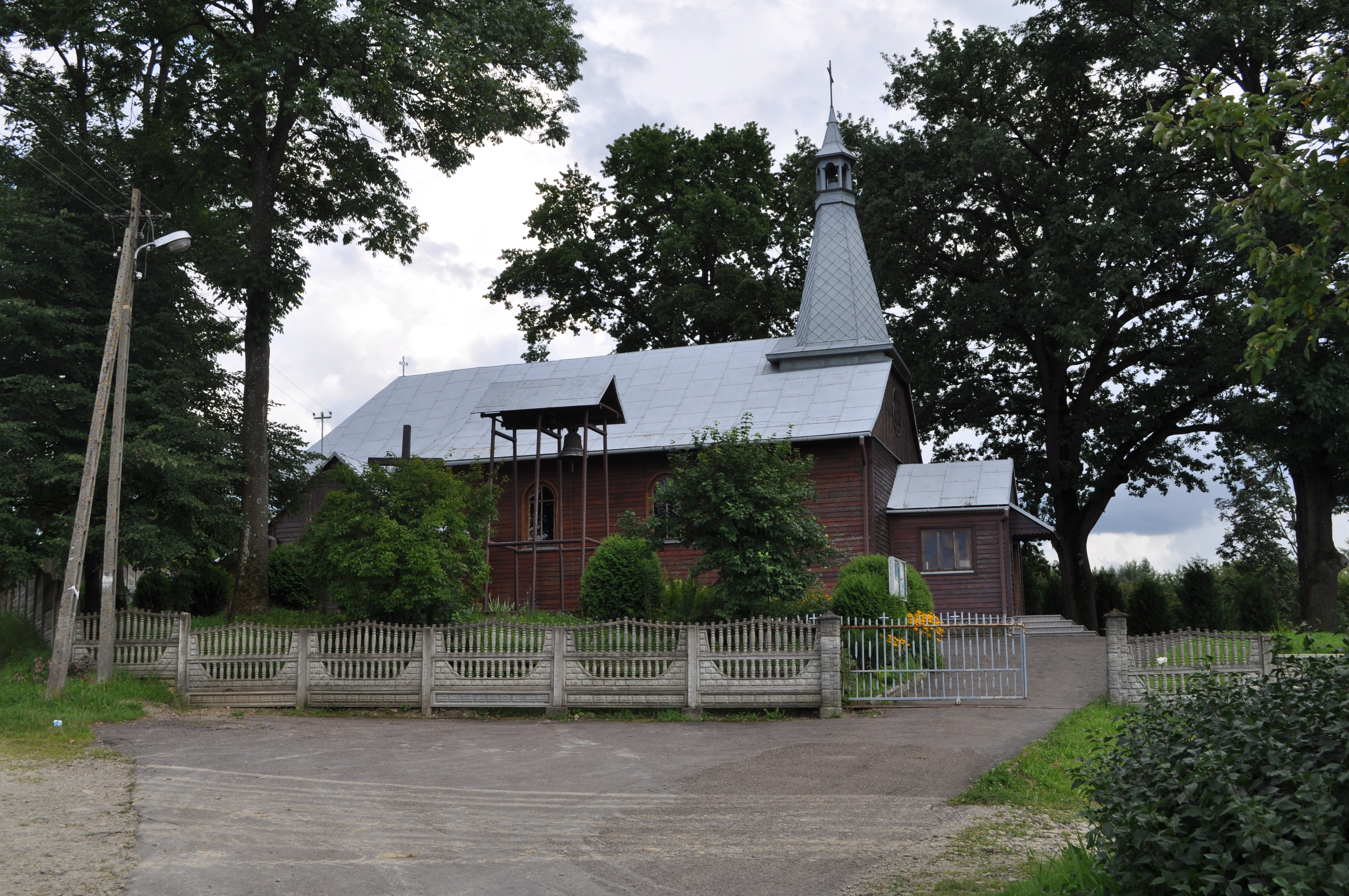
- Church in Sanoczek

- Location within Poland
- Coordinates: 49°33′N 22°9′E
- Country: Poland
- Voivodeship: Subcarpathian
- County: Sanok
- Gmina: Sanok
- Population (2024): 889

Sanoczek [saˈnɔt͡ʂɛk] is a village in the administrative district of Gmina Sanok, within Sanok County, Subcarpathian Voivodeship, in south-eastern Poland.
