= Trepcza =

- Village
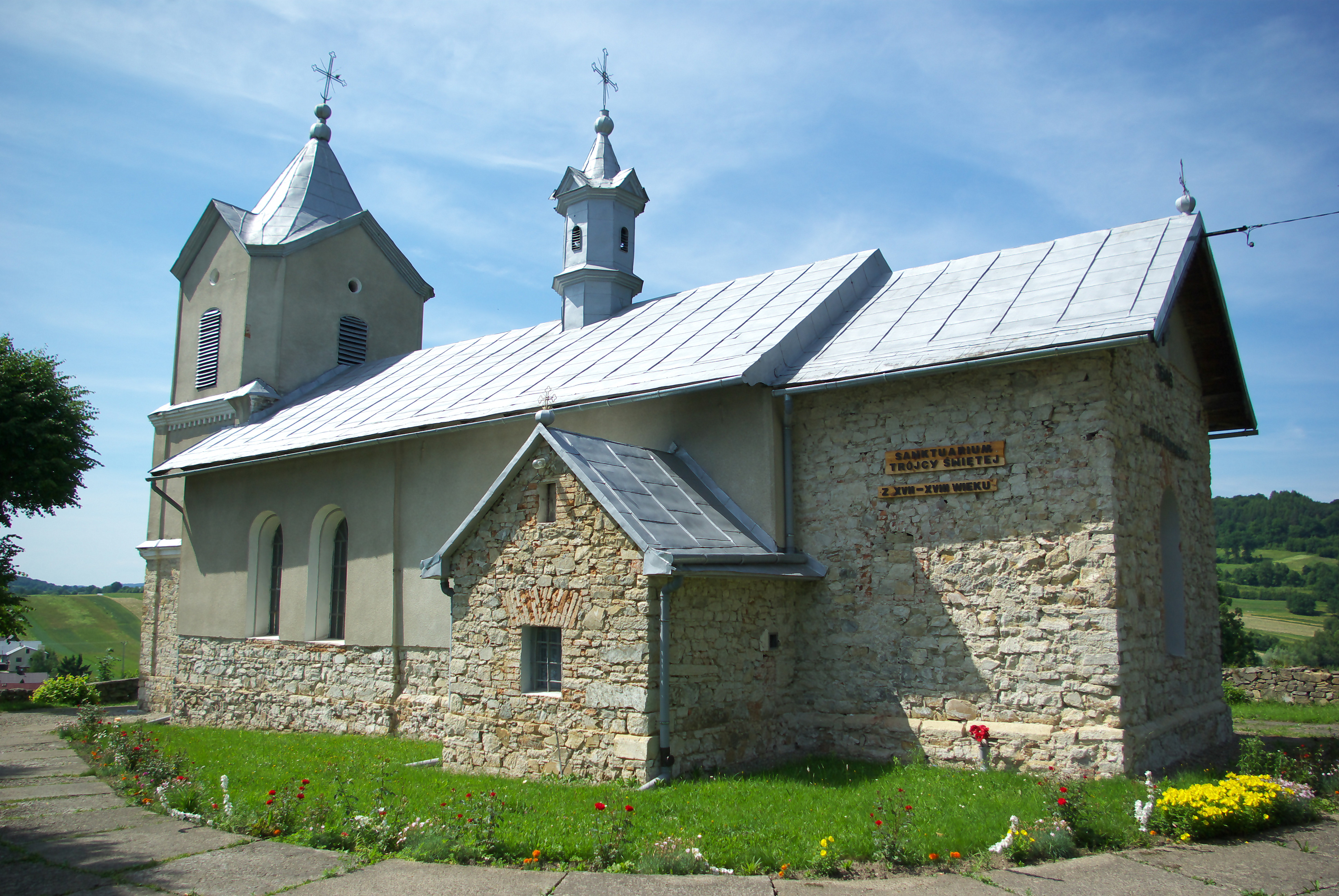
- Church of the Dormition

- Location within Poland
- Coordinates: 49°35′N 22°12′E
- Country: Poland
- Voivodeship: Subcarpathian
- County: Sanok
- Gmina: Sanok

Population
  - Total: 800

Trepcza [ˈtrɛpt͡ʂa] is a village in the administrative district of Gmina Sanok, within Sanok County, Subcarpathian Voivodeship, in south-eastern Poland.

There was once a hilltop monastery of the Order of Saint Basil the Great, but it fell to ruin some time ago, and of it only rubble remains.

== See also ==
- Walddeutsche
