= Lalin, Poland =

Lalin
- Village
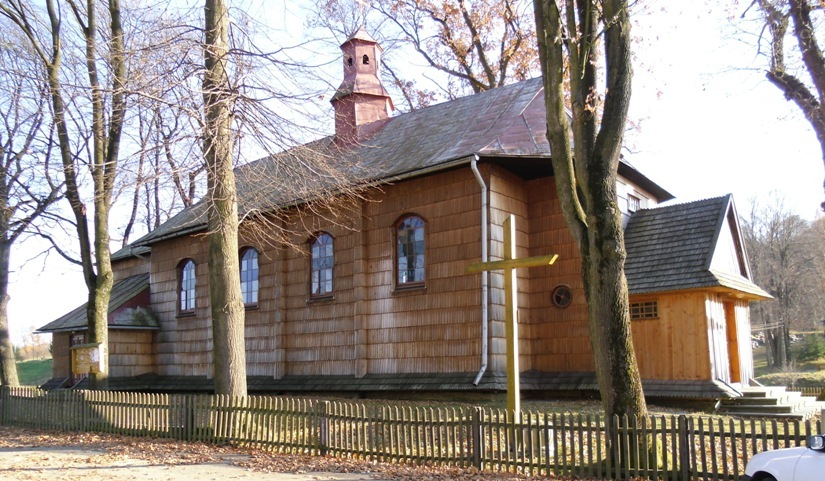
- Formerly Greek Catholic St. George church of St. George, currently Roman Catholic

- Location within Poland
- Coordinates: 49°38′N 22°6′E
- Country: Poland
- Voivodeship: Subcarpathian
- County: Sanok
- Gmina: Sanok
- Population: 300

Lalin [ˈlalʲin] is a village in the administrative district of Gmina Sanok, within Sanok County, Subcarpathian Voivodeship, in south-eastern Poland.

== History ==
Village in the Middle Ages was subdivided into two parts, Ruthenian and German. The village is located in the Lemko region, where for centuries resided ethnographic group of Ukrainian highlanders that until 1947 was living on both sides of the Carpathian Mountains and frontiers.

Among the various ethnic groups of the Ukrainian ethnos (Boikos, Hutsuls, Podolian Volhynians, et al.) especially best preserved are ethnographic groups of mountain dwellers Ukrainian Carpathians, namely Boikos, Hutsuls and Lemkos.

=== After World War II ===
In 1946, after the relocation of the indigenous Ukrainian population into the western Poland (Polish: Ziemie Odzyskane) and Ukraine (Operation Vistula), Poles have settled in the village.

Lemkos were afterwards forbidden to express their identity, to read Lemko literature, to practice Lemko traditions, to wear anything that might identify them as Lemko. Getting caught doing so meant punishment or even death.
