= Srogów Górny =

- Village
- Location within Poland
- Coordinates: 49°36′25″N 22°08′36″E
- Country: Poland
- Voivodeship: Podkarpackie
- County: Sanok
- Gmina: Sanok

Srogów Górny [ˈsrɔɡuf ˈɡurnɨ] is a village in the administrative district of Gmina Sanok, within Sanok County, Podkarpackie Voivodeship, in south-eastern Poland.
