= Church of St. Michael the Archangel, Sanok =

Former Roman Catholic parish church in Sanok, Poland

Church of St. Michael the Archangel
- Kościół św. Michała Archanioła (Polish)
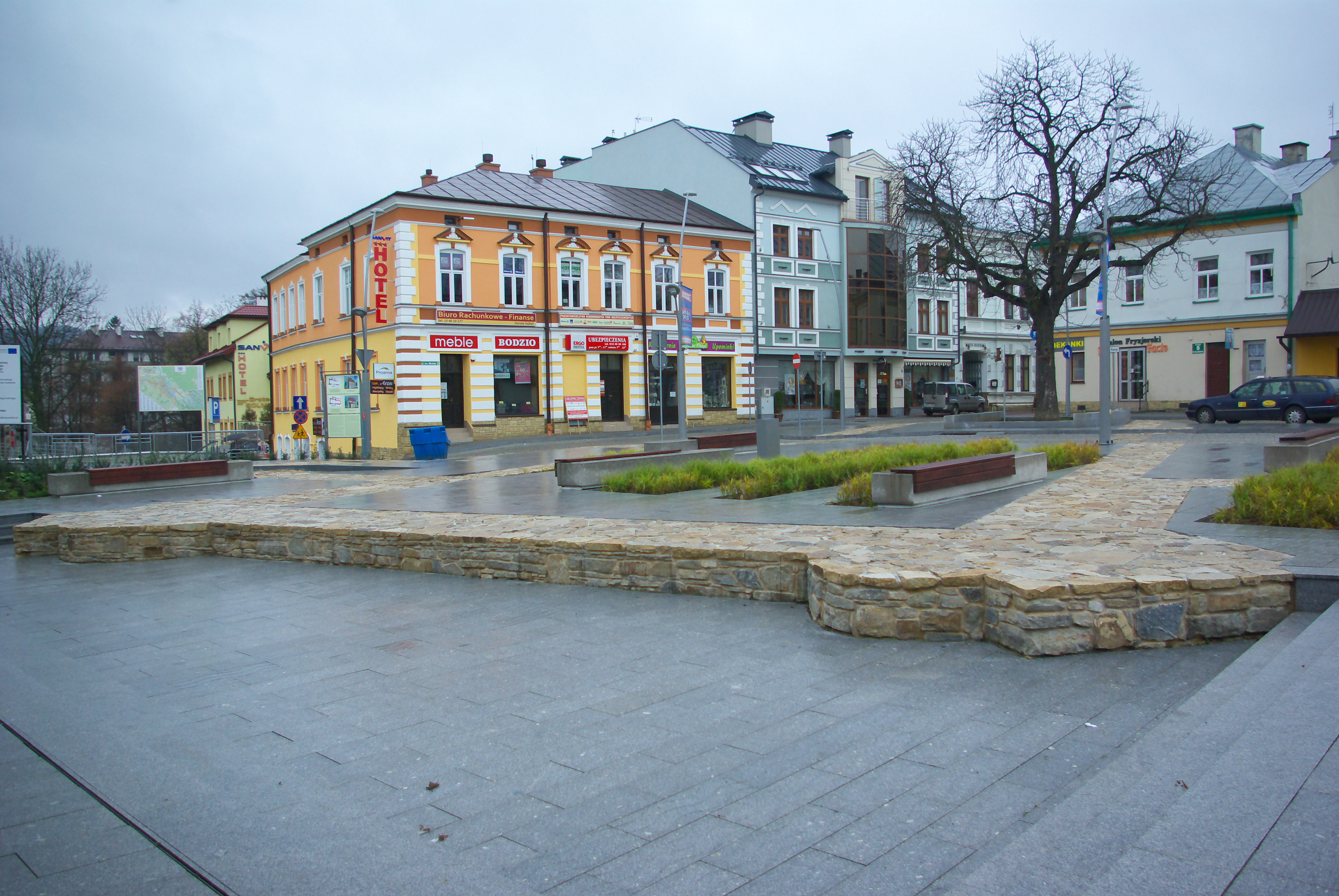
- Outline of the walls of the church at St. Michael's Square after the 2013 revitalization
- Interactive map of the Church of St. Michael the Archangel area

General information
- Type: Church
- Architectural style: Gothic
- Location: Sanok, Poland, St. Michael's Square
- Coordinates: 49°33′39.5″N 22°12′19.4″E
- Construction started: 14th century
- Renovated: 1710
- Demolished: 1784
- Owner: Diocese of Przemyśl

The Church of St. Michael the Archangel (Lat.: ecclesia parochialis Sancti Michaelis Archangeli in Sanok) was a Roman Catholic parish church in Sanok, Poland. The structure was destroyed by fire in 1680 and again in 1782, with its ruins finally demolished in 1788. In its place, the Church of the Transfiguration was built in 1879.

== History ==
The church was located on what was known as the "small market", now St. Michael's Square. Its origins date back to the reign of Duke Yuri II Boleslav. The church, dedicated to Saint Michael the Archangel, was founded by Casimir III the Great. The significant non-Ruthenian population in Sanok during the second half of the 14th century likely contributed to the establishment of Catholic churches at that time.

A subsequent church was funded by Władysław II Jagiełło, who married Elizabeth Granowska there on 2 May 1417. A parish school is documented as early as 1380, possibly led by "Marcus rector scholae". In 1485, a hospital for the poor was established in the suburbs with its own brick Church of Our Lady.

Among its parsons was the composer Sebastian of Felsztyn (1536–1543). The parish school educated notable figures such as Bishop Gregory of Sanok and Jan Grodek, rector of the Jagiellonian University. After the death of Sigismund I, Queen Bona Sforza resided in Sanok, renovating and embellishing the parish church. The church was destroyed by a city fire in 1680 but was restored by parson Franciszek Goźliński in 1705. In 1724, the Collegium Mansionariorum was established.

A medieval burial cemetery was located outside the church's walls, with traces uncovered during archaeological work in April 2012.

From 1723, the church held the status of a prepository church, with Father Franciszek Goźliński serving as prepositus.

On 30 September 1782, the church was destroyed by fire again. Austrian authorities ordered the demolition of its walls and transferred all services to the Franciscan Church, although the parish administration remained separate from the Franciscan friars. The ruins were demolished in 1788, and the parish was relocated to the Church of the Exaltation of the Holy Cross for over a century. The church was reportedly the burial place of Domaradzki, chamberlain of Sandomierz, son of Gabriel of the Gryf coat of arms.

According to the 1745 visitation records of Bishop Wacław Hieronim Sierakowski, the church, dedicated to Saint Michael the Archangel, was "built of cut stone, becoming increasingly grand over time through renovations or better endowments". It housed seven altars: the main altar dedicated to Saint Michael the Archangel, and others to the Assumption of the Blessed Virgin Mary, Saint Hedwig, Our Lady of the Rosary, Saint Stephen, Saint Adalbert, and Our Lady of Grace. The church hosted the Confraternity of the Blessed Virgin Mary, approved by papal legate Zachariasz in 1521, as well as the Rosary and Priestly Confraternities.

In 1792, a circular mandate abolished the mansionary house – located west of the church – and its property, including a parcel near St. Michael's Square and Stróżnia Hill (now Park Hill). In addition to typical vicarial duties, mansionaries were responsible for daily singing of the "Office of the Blessed Virgin Mary" and celebrating votive Masses for the souls of the founder and his family.

From April to September 2012, archaeological excavations were conducted at St. Michael's Square to verify historical records. The work was led by Sanok archaeologists under the supervision of the Polish Conservation Workshops in Rzeszów, Krosno branch, with oversight from Mayor Wojciech Blecharczyk. Expert opinions were provided by professors Zbigniew Pianowski and Tomasz Węcławowicz.

In August 2013, human remains excavated from the church site and other Sanok locations were collectively buried at the Southern Cemetery in Sanok.

== Gallery ==
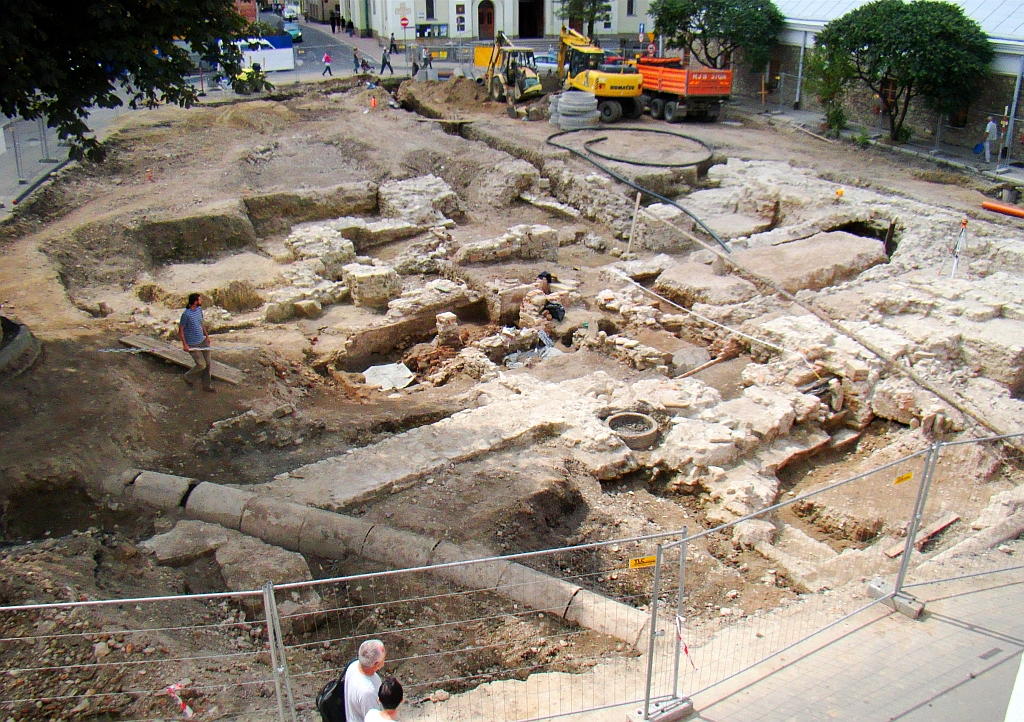
Archaeological excavations at St. Michael's Square, revealing the foundation outline of the church

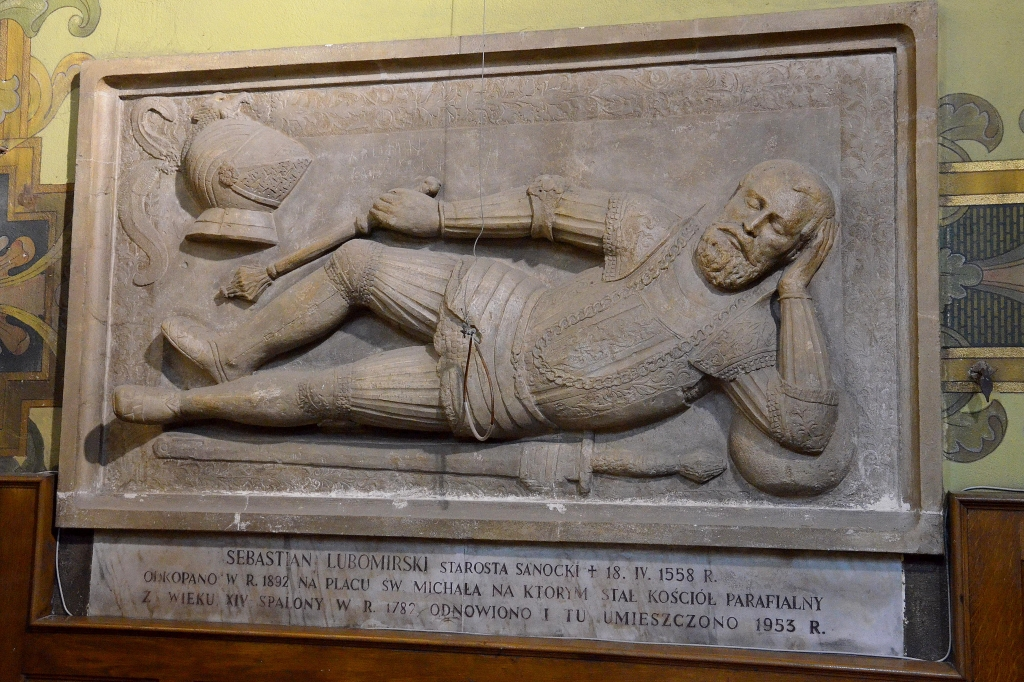
Epitaph of Sebastian Lubomirski

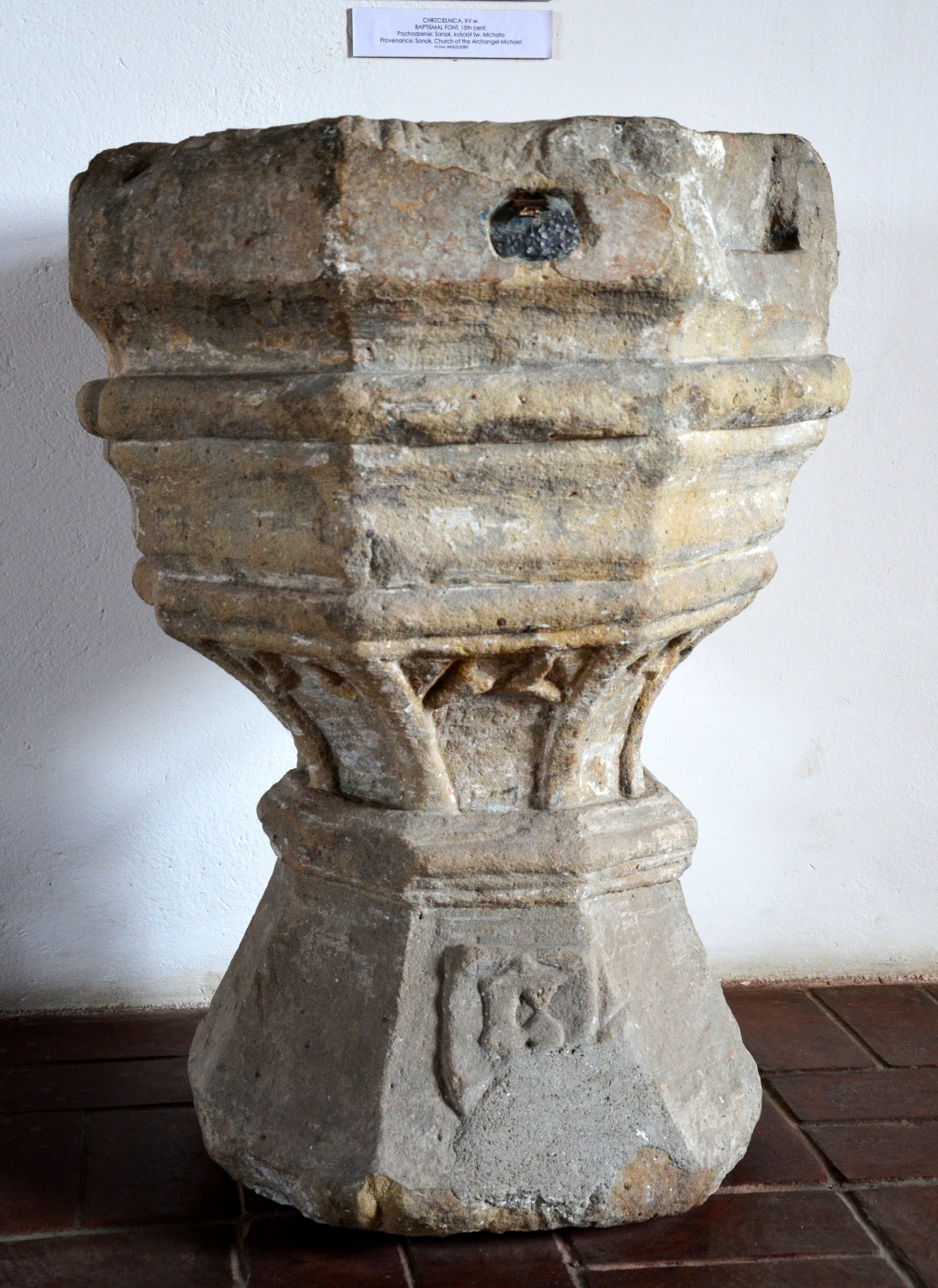
Gothic baptismal font from the church, now in the Sanok Historical Museum

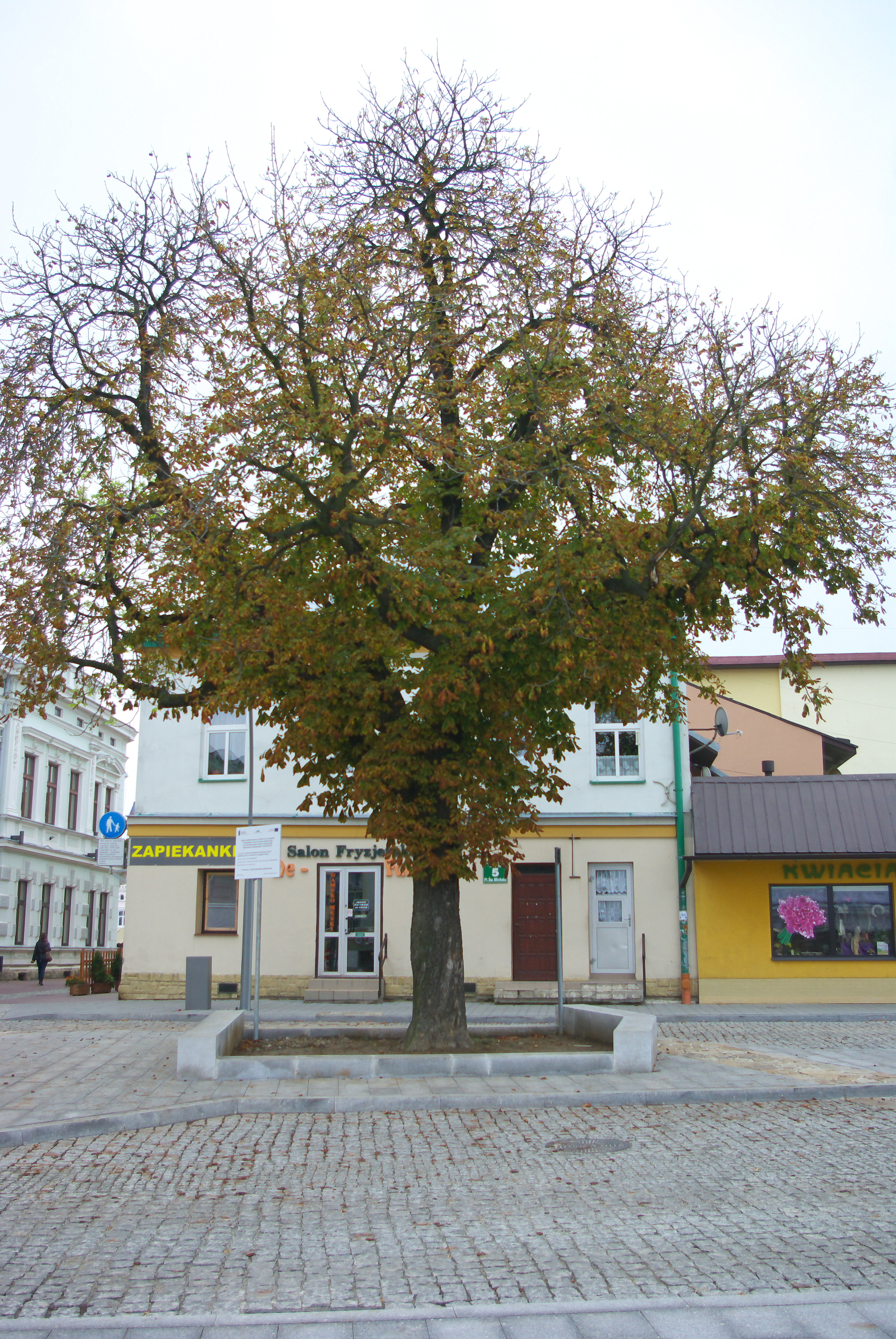
Horse chestnut tree growing where the church's chancel once stood

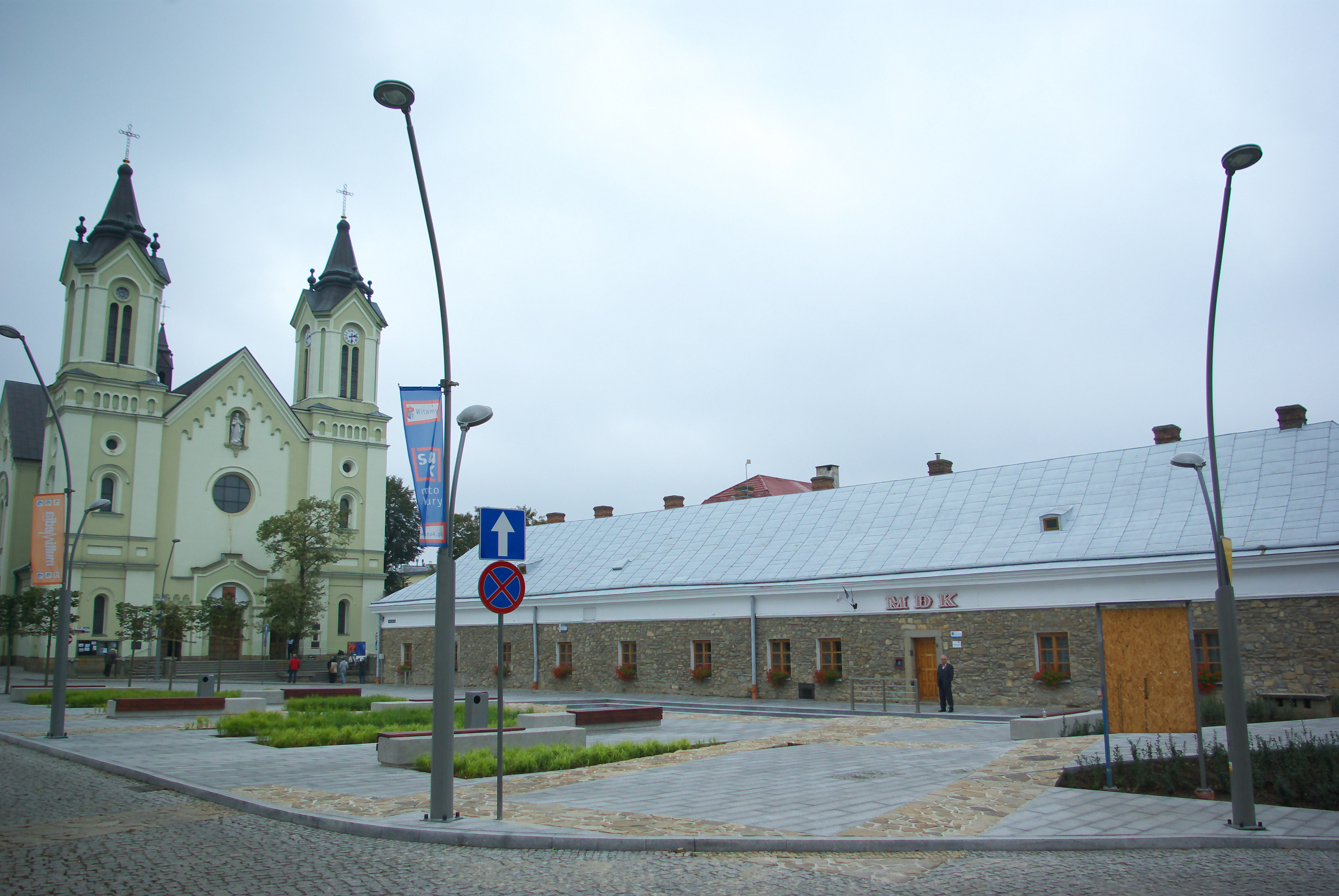
Current view of St. Michael's Square at the former church site
