= Franciscan Church and monastery, Sanok =

Roman Catholic church and monastery in Sanok, Poland

Franciscan Church in Sanok
- Kościół Franciszkanów w Sanoku (Polish)
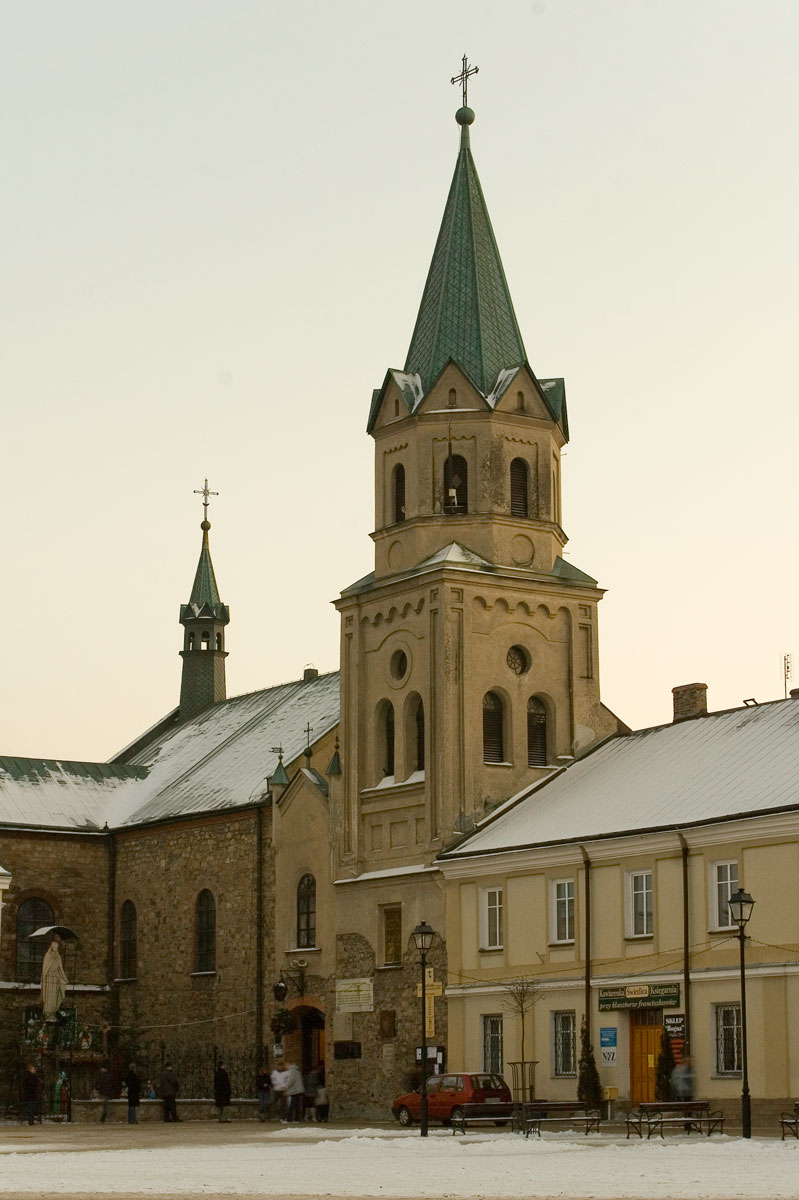
- Franciscan Church (view from the Market Square)
- Franciscan Church in Sanok
- 49°33′37.39″N 22°12′26.81″E
- Location: Sanok, Poland
- Denomination: Catholic Church
- Tradition: Roman Catholic

Architecture
- Architectural type: Romanesque Revival
- Completed: 1640

Specifications
- Materials: Stone

Franciscan monastery in Sanok
- Klasztor Franciszkanów w Sanoku (Polish)
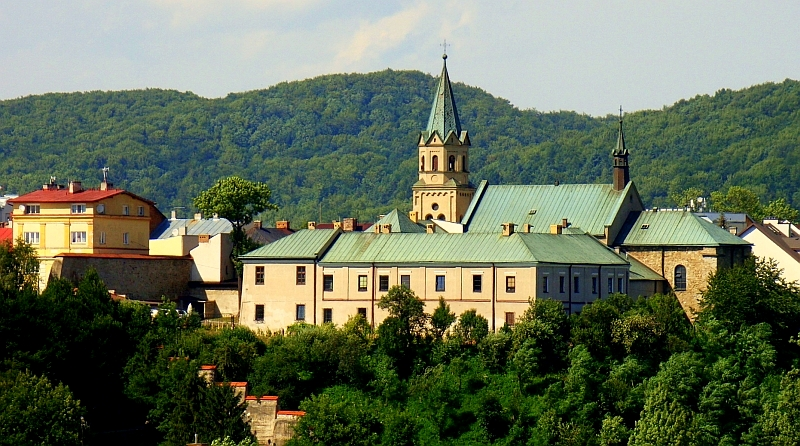
- Monastery buildings (view from the southeast)
- Interactive map of Franciscan monastery in Sanok

Monastery information
- Order: Franciscans
- Denomination: Catholic Church
- Established: 1377

Architecture
- Completion date: 1640

Site
- Location: 7 Franciszkańska Street, Sanok
- Country: Poland
- Website: sanok.franciszkanie.pl

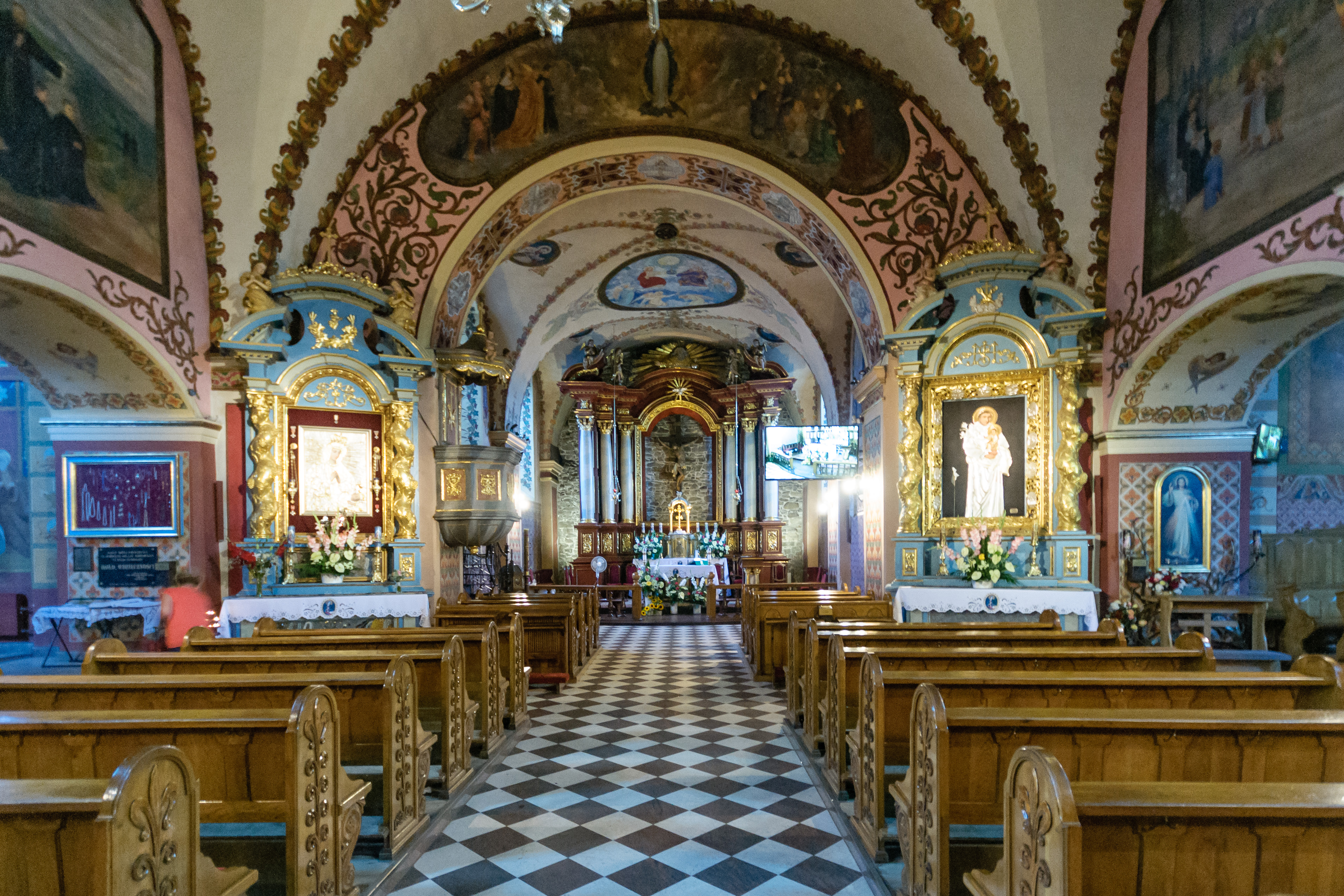
Main nave. On the left, the painting of Our Lady of Consolation; on the right, the painting of St. Anthony

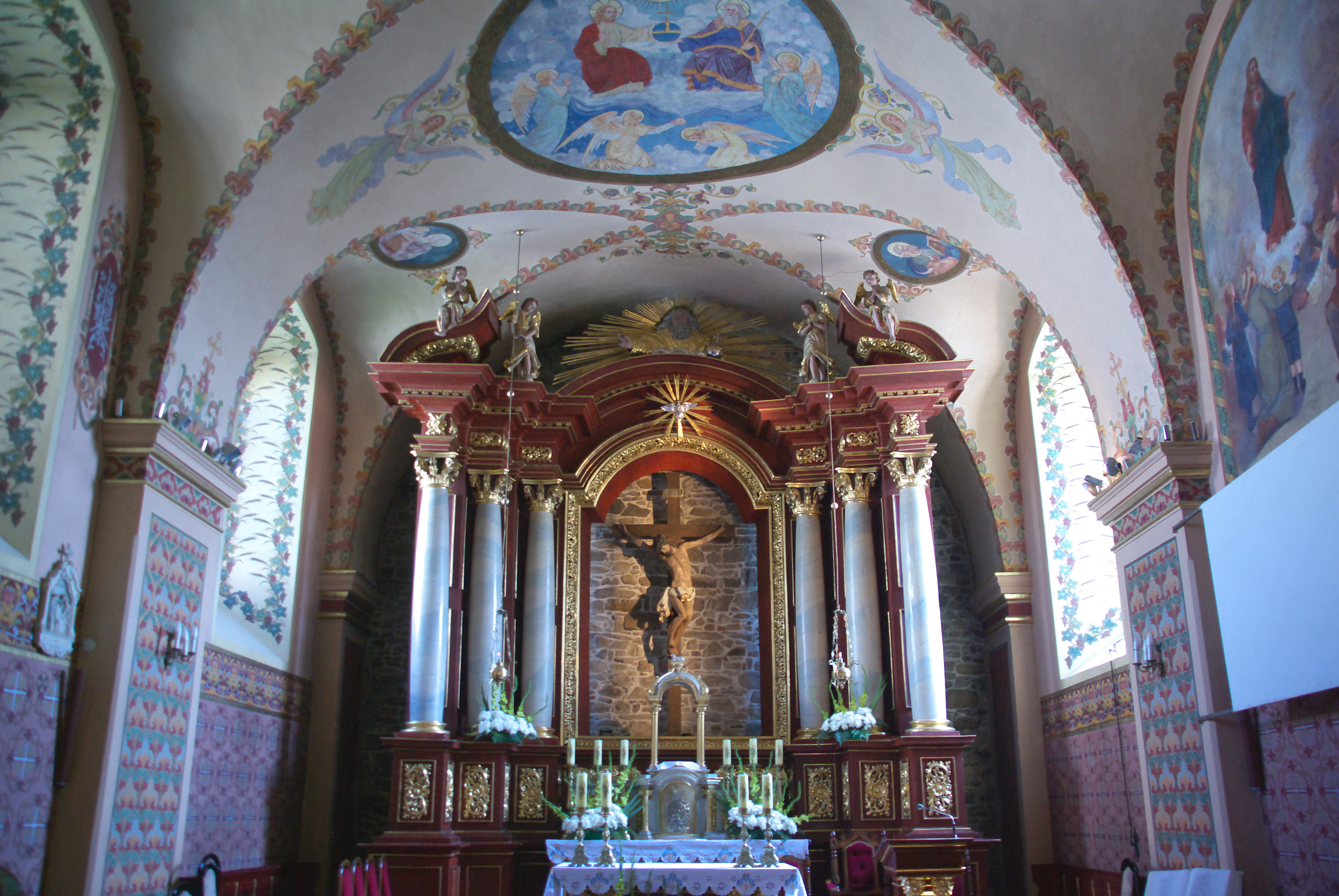
Main altar in the chancel

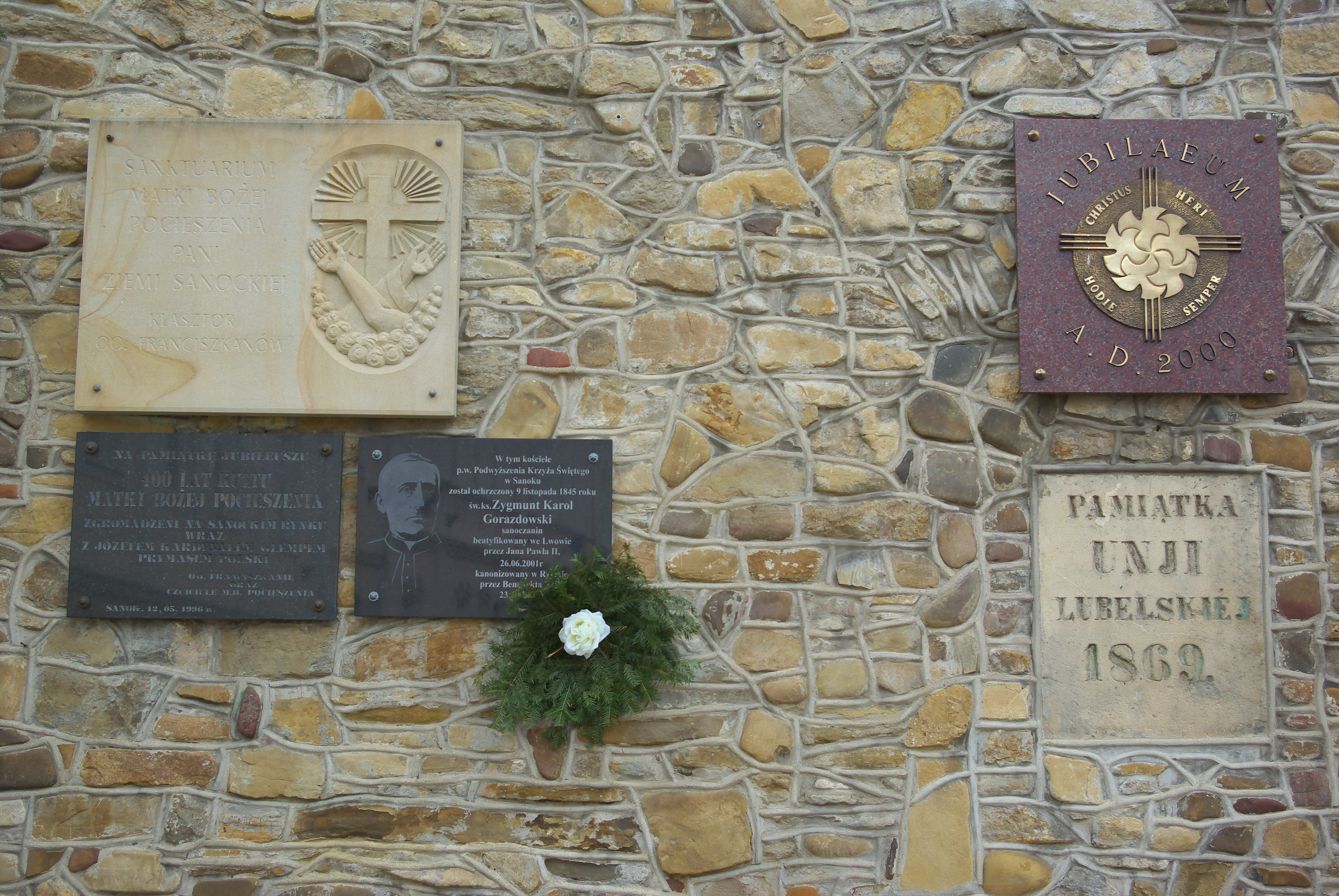
Plaques at the main entrance

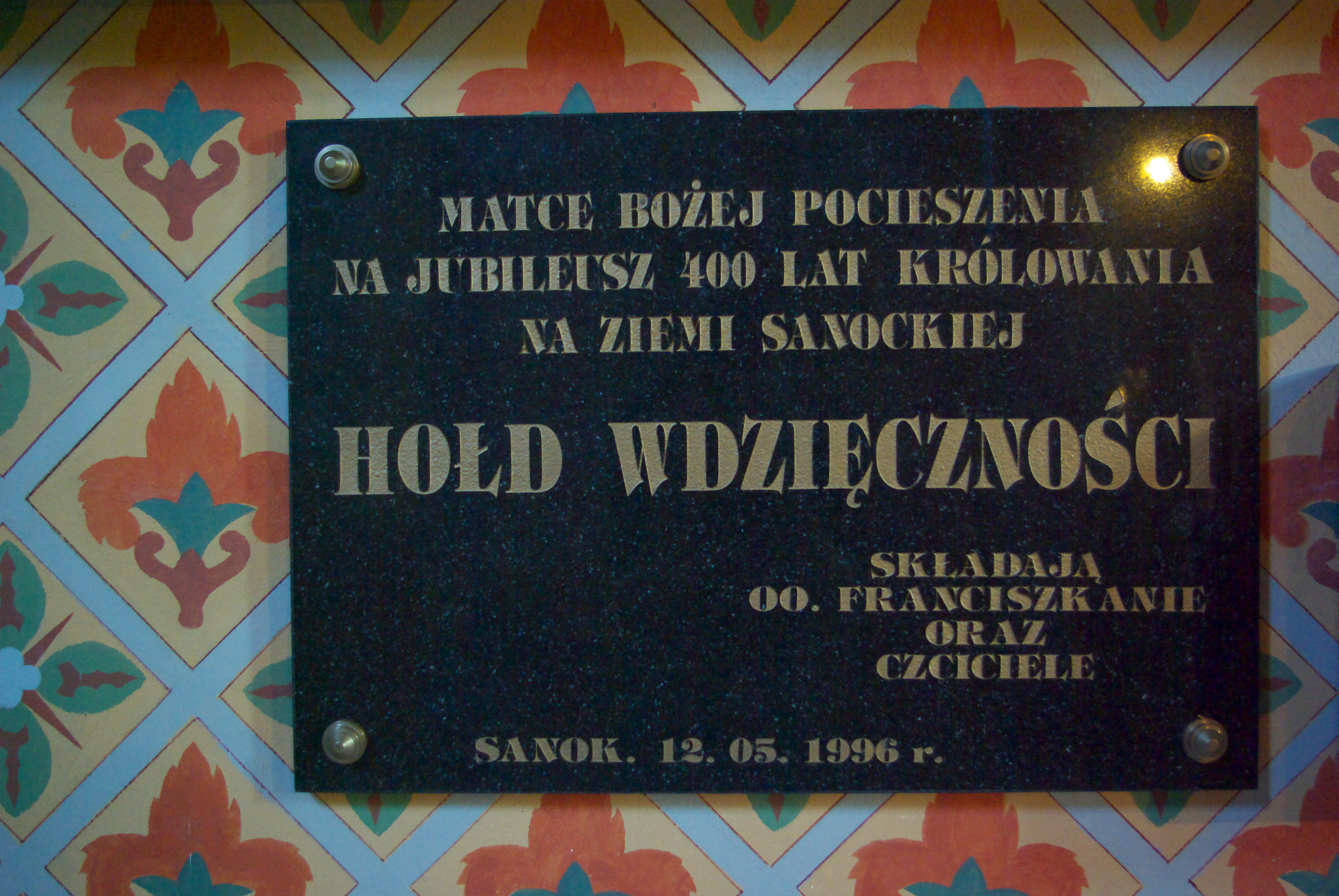
Plaque in tribute to 400 years of Our Lady of Consolation's reign

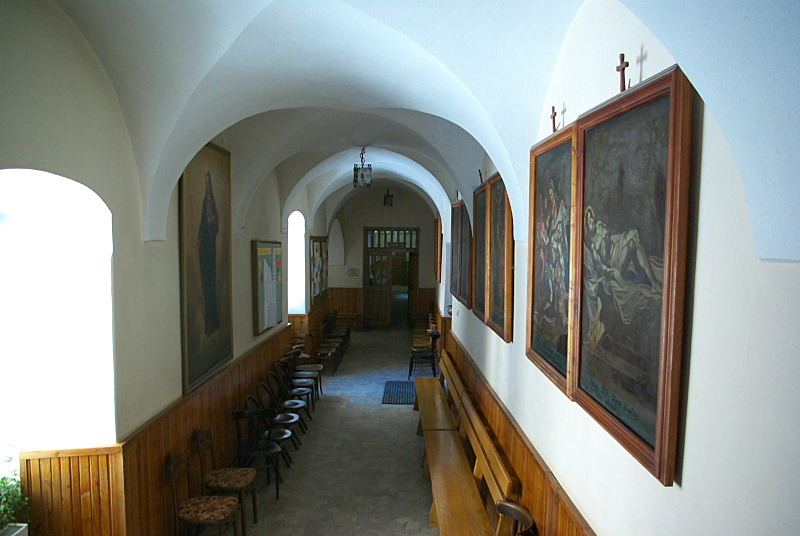
Cloister corridors

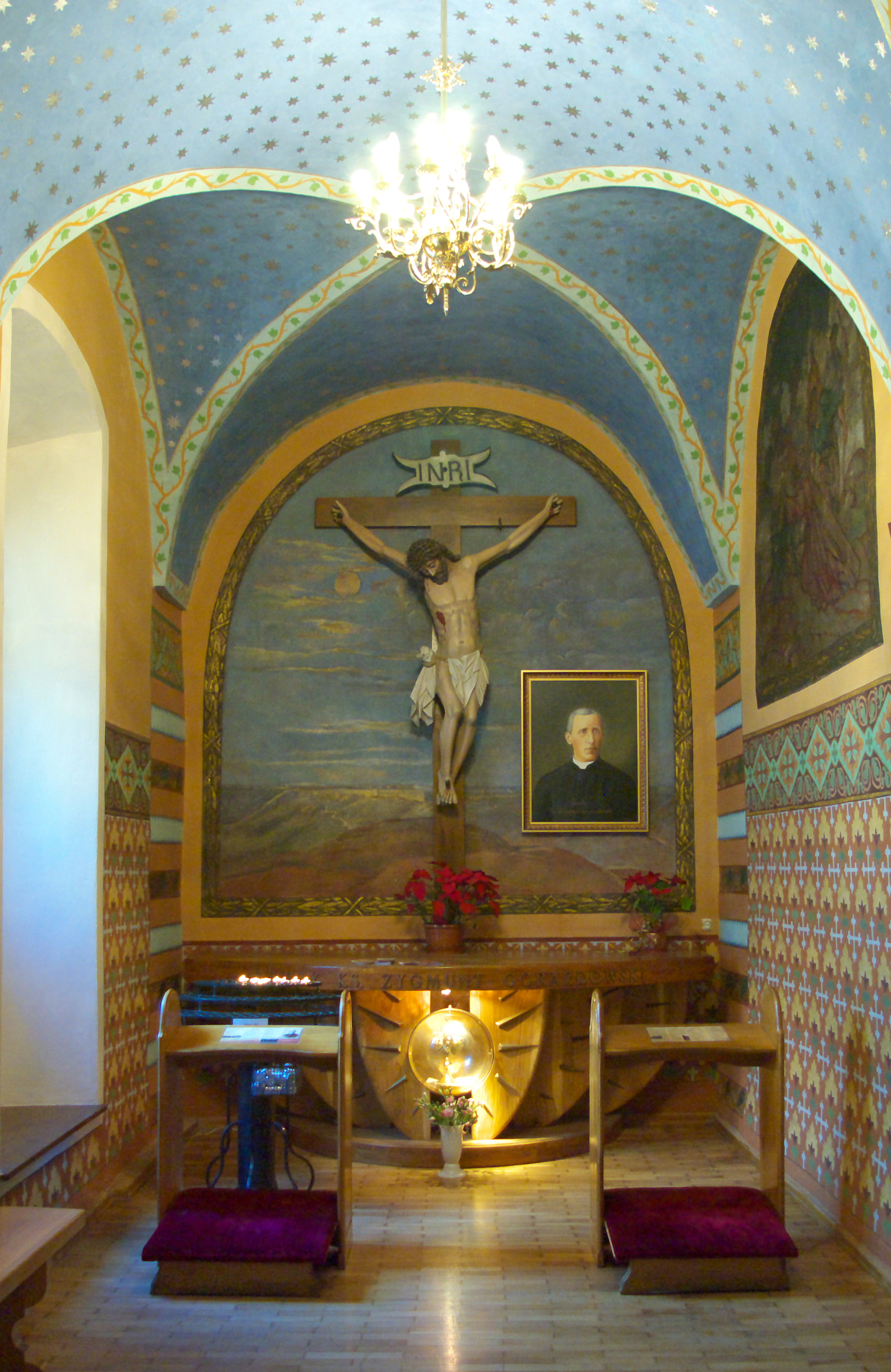
Renovated chapel of St. Zygmunt Gorazdowski

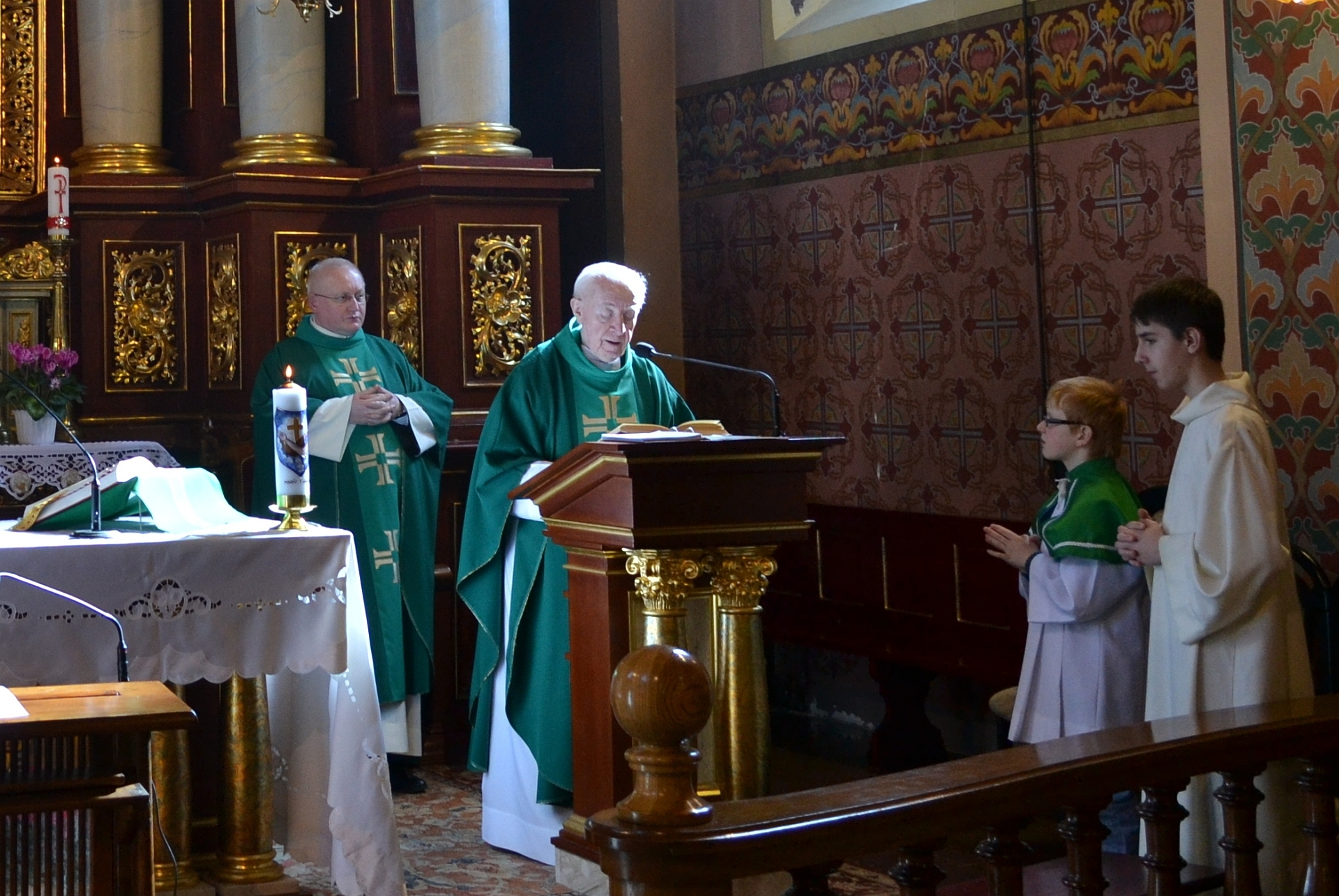
Mass in the church; from the left, Father Zbigniew Kubit and Father Andrzej Deptuch (2014)

The Franciscan Church and monastery is a Romanesque Revival church and monastery complex located in Sanok, Poland.

The complex is under the administration of the Franciscan Province of St. Anthony of Padua and Bl. James of Strepar. The monastery is situated in Sanok's Downtown district at 7 Franciszkańska Street, overlooking a steep escarpment that rises from Podgórze Street in the western part of the Błonie district. The Franciscan Church adjoins the monastery on its northern side, with the main entrance located at the southeastern corner of Sanok's Market Square.

== History ==
Following the establishment of the Franciscan Order in 1209, its members began arriving in Poland in the early 13th century, including in the Subcarpathian region, with a presence in Przemyśl by 1237. Sanok became the second location in the region for their settlement. The Franciscan Church and monastery were founded on 27 February 1377, under a privilege issued by Duke Vladislaus II of Opole, then the governor of Red Ruthenia. The duke instructed the Archbishop of Lviv, Maciej, and the Sanok burgrave, also named Maciej, to endow the Franciscans with a manor and construct a church outside the city walls. Construction occurred between 1372 and 1376, resulting in the erection of the Church of the Virgin Mary, which was assigned to the Minorite Franciscans from Lviv. This church was located near the present-day Tadeusz Kościuszko Street, close to Park Hill, in the area now known as Gregory of Sanok Street. The organization of the church and diocese was overseen by Eryk of Winsen. The initial church and monastery buildings were wooden and located outside the city walls, now part of the Downtown district.

In 1384, Elizabeth of Poland, sister of Casimir III the Great and mother of King Louis I of Hungary, granted permission to relocate the Franciscan seat within the city walls. On land donated by Princess Elizabeth, and after acquiring additional city plots, the Franciscans built a wooden monastery and church with a brick sacristy. The church's erection act and donation are dated 5 July 1384. The new church was dedicated to the Finding of the Holy Cross. In 1384, the rector of the Church of St. Michael attempted to seize the monastery, but Queen Elizabeth of Bosnia, wife of Louis I and mother of Queen Jadwiga of Poland, ordered the starosta, council, and citizens to protect the Franciscans, who were moved inside the city. In 1387, Chartman Ghyr, a cleric and public notary, reaffirmed in Krosno the documents approved by Duke Vladislaus II and Queen Elizabeth in the presence of Bishop Eryk of Winsen. Over the centuries, Sanok suffered multiple fires (1457, 1470, 1514, 1566), with the church surviving the 1566 fire. A fire in 1604, caused by Tatars, destroyed the church. Reconstruction was completed in 1606, led by Sanok chamberlain Piotr II Bal, resulting in a single-nave, brick Baroque church.

Later, the church's title changed from the Finding of the Holy Cross to the Exaltation of the Holy Cross (celebrated on 14 September), reportedly after the Second Vatican Council. During the Polish–Lithuanian Commonwealth, the monastery hosted sejmiks for the Sanok Land in 1612. Another fire in 1632 destroyed the church and monastery. Between 1632 and 1640, a reconstruction using quarried stone established the current form of the complex. During this period, new wooden monastery buildings were erected, and from 1717, they were replaced with a uniform brick structure. Additional wings of the monastery quadrangle were built between 1722 and 1747 and between 1758 and 1775. Further fires occurred in 1676 and 1743. Between 1846 and 1847, the monastery was renovated, adding an upper story. In 1766, the Brotherhood of St. Ivo was established. In 1790, a transverse monastery wing was added.

In the meantime, after the parish Church of Saint Michael the Archangel burned down on 30 September 1782, the monastic church served as the parish church (the parish was transferred to the Franciscan Church, although its administration was not handed over to the Franciscan friars) until 19 December 1886, when the Parish of the Transfiguration was established (during that period, the guardians of the monastery simultaneously held the office of parish priest).

During the Austro-Hungarian Empire, the authorities under Joseph II repurposed part of the monastery as a prison (due to the lack of a city jail) and a county court, confiscating some church property. On 1 November 1851, at 5:30 AM, Emperor Franz Joseph I of Austria attended Mass at the church during his journey through Galicia and the Duchy of Bukovina.

On the night of 9–10 May 1872, a devastating fire damaged the church, destroying nearly a third of the city. Reconstruction followed, with the vaults and roof rebuilt, but the church lost its Baroque style, including the tower's Baroque helmet and a domed side chapel. Painter Tabiński from Rzeszów decorated the church interior, with his work preserved until 1935. Reconstruction was completed in 1886, including the vaults and roof. The Baroque vault was lowered, windows were bricked up, and an entrance to a chapel was created. By autumn 1895, the church tower, damaged in the fire, was rebuilt under the design of architect Władysław Beksiński, with Karol Gerardis as the contractor, nearly doubling its height. Previously, the tower had a domed shape. In 1896, a small turret for the sanctus bell was added. Further restorations occurred in 1905, when two tower stories and a new helmet were constructed.

On 25 August 1900, the monastery was visited by Leon Piniński, the Governor of the Kingdom of Galicia and Lodomeria. On 18 May 1914, a landslide affected the hill on which the church stands. In 1920, the church's chapels were raised. From 1935 to 1939, Sanok painter Władysław Lisowski decorated the church interior with polychrome paintings:

- Above the chapel of St. Maximilian Kolbe, a fresco titled St. Francis Sending Monks into the World features local figures, including Antoni Jędrzejowski, Br. Michał Czyż, and Br. Metody Wojcieszek, with an Assisi-like view resembling Sanok's panorama.
- The second painting, placed on the arch connecting the main nave with the chancel, depicts a scene of homage and worship offered by representatives of various social classes to the Mother of God. Among those worshipping are also the townspeople, including W. Lisowski himself (a kneeling figure dressed in a kersey), his daughters Maria and Helena Nehring with a child in arms (the future doctor Jerzy Nehring), lawyer Kazimierz Lisowski from Brzozów, the craftsman Antoni Borczyk (wearing a Czamara) living by the church along with his family (his daughters), the mayor of Sanok, Maksymilian Słuszkiewicz, painted in noble attire, and the guardian of the Sanok convent, Father Teofil Bazan.
- A third painting in the main nave illustrates the Finding of the Holy Cross.

In the 1930s, Lisowski repainted the side altars in a rosewood color. In 1898, Sanok painter Włodarski created paintings in the church porch, including a depiction of St. Francis in prayer and the Polish emblem on the ceiling. In the late 1930s, engineer Wilhelm Szomek advised on renovations, including plastering the church facade facing the Market Square and retaining "rustic stone" on the chancel's eastern garden side.

In the 19th century, the monastery buildings were listed under number 16 in the city. On 16 September 1889, Father Stanisław Stojałowski was found guilty of ecclesiastical offenses and sentenced to lose his parish in Kulików and undergo six weeks of retreat at the Sanok monastery.

In the early years of the Second Polish Republic, from 1921 to 1923, the monastery housed a Minor Franciscan Seminary. Around 1920, a "soup kitchen" operated on the monastery's ground floor, providing meals. Until the early 1930s, the Sanok monastery, like other Franciscan convents in the Subcarpathian region, was under the Province of the Order of Friars Minor Conventual in Lviv, before being transferred to the Province of St. Anthony of Padua and Bl. James of Strepar. In 1931, the Franciscan convent owned property at 30 Ignacy Daszyński Street (originally conscription number 998).

During World War II under the German occupation, and for a year after the war, the monastery housed the Polish Commercial School (Polnische Öffentliche Handelsschule). After the Eastern Front passed in 1944, the complex's roofing was damaged and repaired by Kazimierz Niemiec.

On 3 October 1946, the Sanok guardian was arrested and taken to Rzeszów, accused of allowing meetings of the illegal Home Army at the monastery. He was released after four days and requested a transfer, leaving Sanok in November. In the post-war years, the monastery suffered under communist authorities, who confiscated the monks' fuel allowance. In 1950, the state nationalized the Franciscans' 34-hectare farm at 10 Zagrody Street, leaving them with approximately 2 hectares. In 1973, part of the remaining land was purchased by the state, where a high school was built, and Franciscans served as catechists there until 1984. A public chapel, later the Chapel of St. Maximilian Maria Kolbe, was established on the remaining land and transferred to the Przemyśl diocese in 1984.

In 1945, a Franciscan Minor Seminary was established at the monastery. However, from 1950, its graduates were barred from further education at the state-run Sanok Gymnasium. On 3 July 1952, the seminary was shut down by communist authorities, who also seized part of the monastery, later reclaimed by the Franciscans. In 1954, relics of the Holy Cross and the icon of Our Lady of Grace were transferred from the nearby Greek Catholic cathedral, which had been unused since Operation Vistula in 1947.

On 3 May 1956, the Secretariat of the Polish Episcopal Conference designated the church's second title as Our Lady of Consolation, alongside the Exaltation of the Holy Cross, and set the second Sunday of May as the indulgence feast. On 1 July 1969, Bishop Ignacy Tokarczuk re-established the Parish of the Exaltation of the Holy Cross and Our Lady of Consolation under Franciscan administration. Franciscans from Sanok also served as priests in nearby Międzybrodzie and Trepcza.

Painter Władysław Lisowski restored the church's altars after World War II (1946) and in later years (1961, 1962). In 1972, the Franciscan complex, including the church, monastery, a mid-19th-century barn with a stone and wooden treadmill, and an 18th/19th-century monastery fence, was added to Sanok's updated register of monuments. On 6 January 1976, a fire broke out in the church but was quickly extinguished.

In 1887, Ferdynand Majerski crafted a wooden balustrade in the chancel. In 1888, Jakub Zandonelli from Jasło laid the original church floor in red, black, and white-gray colors. In 1948, a new armored tabernacle, crafted by Karol Baranowicz, replaced the previous wooden one. In 1965, paneling was installed in the church at a height of 142 cm by Nieznański.

In 1977, the church's polychrome, church porch, and garden chapel were restored by Jan Płodzień. In the 1980s, the church and monastery roofs were covered with copper sheeting. Issues with the escarpment's instability persisted at the base of the complex. Between 1998 and 1999, archaeological and conservation work uncovered a medieval cemetery and 14th-century walls. From 2000 to 2003, conservation and renovation continued, restoring the altars and paintings of St. Anthony of Padua (by October 2001) and Our Lady of Consolation.

The complex (church, monastery, and fence) is listed in the provincial (1967) and municipal registers of Sanok monuments. In 1978, the Sanok branch of the Polish Tourist and Sightseeing Society's Monument Preservation Committee placed a plaque on the facade noting the building's historic status.

In 2019, construction began to stabilize the escarpment due to numerous cracks in the church buildings.

== Architecture ==
The church is oriented, with the chancel, housing the main altar, facing east. The current appearance of the church and monastery differs from its original form. The 1872 reconstruction removed its Baroque style. The church interior comprises a rectangular chancel, a main nave, and two side chapels, forming a layout resembling a Latin cross. The windows are semi-circular. Crypts lie beneath the church and chapels. The tower's lower level is made of quarried stone, while the upper two are brick. In 1998, the main altar was redesigned to reveal a section of the stone wall.

The original altars were restored between 1777 and 1778 by painter Serafiński from Rzeszów. The current main altar, rebuilt after the fire in 1887, was designed by Ferdynand Majerski from Przemyśl. It features a late-Baroque crucifix (noted for its cult and votive offerings in 1694), a dove symbolizing the Holy Spirit, and a gloria of God the Father at the top. Above, the ceiling depicts the Holy Trinity and the Four Evangelists. Statues of Bonaventure and Thomas Aquinas, crafted by Majerski in 1887, flank the altar. Four angel statues (two standing, two seated) adorn the pillar capitals. In the late 19th century, the main altar was painted in red marble.

A wooden baptismal font from 1996, designed by Jan Penar with polychromes by Artur Olechniewicz, is located in the chancel, depicting Franciscan and Sanok-related saints: Francis of Assisi, Clare of Assisi, Maximilian Kolbe, Blessed Jakub Strzemię, St. Zygmunt Gorazdowski, and Servants of God martyrs Father Michał Tomaszek and Father Zbigniew Strzałkowski.

The original pulpit was in the chancel's right side, moved to the left in 1887. The current pulpit, crafted by Majerski in 1889, features two angel figures on its canopy. In 1897, Józef Nowak funded the pulpit stairs and a nearby wooden choir stall. A similar choir stall was placed on the right side near the sacristy entrance, both moved to the St. Francis chapel in 1977. Initially, eight pews (by Dutkiewicz, 1897) were under the pulpit, with 16 in the main nave (by Michał Car, 1939). In 1976, the tower's plaster was removed, and in 1977, the upper part was replastered, while the lower part retained its stone appearance, as did the church facade facing the Market Square.

The monastery, adjoining the church to the south, originally had three wings around a monastic garden, now with two gardens. Since the 19th-century reconstruction, it is a single-story building. The ground floor features cross-vaulted cloisters leading from the monastic garden to the church porch, sacristy, and chancel. The sacristy was renovated between 1900 and 1901, with paintings by Father Cyryl Sadowski, restored in 1970 by Sanok painters Tadeusz Marian Turkowski and Kazimierz Florek. In the eastern cloister wing, the St. Zygmunt Gorazdowski chapel, funded by the Rylski family in the 19th century (also called the "Garden Chapel"), was renovated in 1901 and reconstructed in 1977.

Since late 2005, the church tower has featured a carillon of eight bells (total weight 250 kg), playing melodies every three hours between 6:00 AM and 9:00 PM.

== Sacred objects and artistic monuments ==
- A crucifix in the main altar of the chancel (late 17th century); votive offerings were confiscated by Austrian authorities in the late 18th/early 19th century.
- A Baroque crucifix in the church porch (late 18th century), with a 1970 plaque commemorating Marian missions.
- A crucifix in the St. Zygmunt Gorazdowski chapel (early 18th century).
- An altar with a painting of St. Anthony of Padua (17th-century references, right side of the main nave), featuring two twisted columns with leaves and grapes, topped with angels. In 1937, Władysław Lisowski repainted it rosewood. The painting shows St. Anthony holding three lilies in his right hand and the Child Jesus in his left. Behind this painting is an image of the Sacred Heart of Jesus, painted by Tabiński from Rzeszów in 1888.
- Polychrome ceiling paintings in the chancel: the Evangelists Matthew (human head), Luke (ox head), Mark (lion head), and John (eagle head). The arch toward the main altar features the Sanok coat of arms, the Holy Spirit, and the Polish Eagle. The arch toward the main nave depicts the Immaculate Virgin Mary and others, including guardian Father Teofil Bazan and Antoni Borczyk.
- Main nave polychromes: St. Francis receiving the Portiuncula indulgence from Jesus and Mary, the Finding of the Holy Cross (near the choir), and images of St. Francis, Blessed Jakub Strzemię, St. Louis of France, St. Clare, Blessed Salomea, and St. Elizabeth (right side).
- The St. Francis of Assisi chapel (southern, right side of the main nave), adjacent to the sacristy, renovated in 1935 by Józef Kopaczek, with polychromes by Władysław Lisowski (1935–1936). Paintings include Admission of St. Kinga and Bolesław the Chaste to the Third Franciscan Order (on the sacristy-adjacent wall), St. Anthony Giving Alms to the Poor, Especially Children (above the entrance), and St. Francis Preaching to the Birds (above the nave exit). The chapel's St. Francis altar was restored in 1935. Polychrome restoration began in February 1999, uncovering original Baroque decoration from the late 17th/early 18th century, and was dedicated by Father Kazimierz Malinowski on 4 October 1999.
- The St. Maximilian Kolbe chapel (northern, left side of the main nave, formerly called the Our Lady of Consolation chapel, later St. Joseph and Our Lady of the Rosary). Renovated in 1908 (plastered inside, brick exterior replaced with stone) and again between 1935 and 1936. A new altar with alabaster columns, designed by Władysław Lisowski, was completed by 1937. The chapel's painting of St. Maximilian Kolbe was created by Sanok painter Bronisław Naczas in 1971. The chapel was renovated by July 2004.
- A wooden choir from 1888, crafted by Ferdynand Majerski, with historic organs from the same year by Jan Śliwiński.
- A statue of the Immaculate Virgin Mary in the garden next to the townhouse at 18 Market Square, inscribed: "1377 600 Years of Franciscans in Sanok 1977". Crafted by Edward Kość from Jasło, it uses a pedestal from a previous Christ statue. The statue was repainted in 2012. Originally, a 1898 statue of Jesus Christ by Stanisław Piątkiewicz, a copy of Bertel Thorvaldsen's Christ statue in the Potocki Chapel, stood there, funded by Karol Gerardis with an Odrzykoń stone pedestal, made of cement and hydraulic lime. It remained until the 1970s.
- Wooden doors separating the church porch from the main nave, with reliefs of St. Francis of Assisi, St. Anthony of Padua, Franciscan emblems, and angels, crafted by Stanisław Piątkiewicz in 1898.
- A fancy portrait of Elizabeth of Poland, the church's founder, donated in 1882, located in the sacristy.
- A painting of St. Joseph in the sacristy, by Genowefa Stepek, 1964.
- A painting of St. Valentine by Władysław Lisowski, 1927, on the staircase.
- Stations of the Cross in the main nave, made in 1938 by the St. Adalbert Works in Poznań.
- Four wooden confessionals, crafted in 1906.
- Fourteen 18th-century paintings of the Passion of Christ in the cloisters.
- A painting of St. Thérèse of Lisieux by Antoni Zientkiewicz from Poznań, 1927, originally in the St. Joseph chapel, later moved to a pillar between the chapel and left altar, and in 1969 to a pillar near the sacristy entrance.

Previously, the church housed paintings of Our Lady of the Scapular (transferred to the Church of the Virgin Mary Queen of Poland in Zahutyń) and Our Lady of the Rosary (moved to Jasło).

== Commemorative and informational plaques ==
- A plaque commemorating a solemn funeral on 7 November 1758 for the bones of those buried in the church, likely Sanok's oldest memorial plaque. The partially legible inscription reads: "In the year 1758, on 17 November, a solemn funeral was held for the bones of those buried in this church...". Until 1897, it was on the church porch floor.
- An epitaph for Maria Amalia Mniszech (1736–1772), stating: "D.O.M. Maria Amelia née Brühl Mniszchowa, General's Wife of Greater Poland. Died at 36 on 30 April 1772 in Dukla. Requests a Hail Mary". Until 1897, it was on the church porch floor.
- A stone plaque from 1847 commemorating the church's foundation and the monastery's upper story construction, located in the monastery. Inscription: "The Minorite Fathers' Monastery was founded by Władysław, Prince of Opole, Wieluń, and Ruthenia in 1387. After the burning of the Missionaries' church in 1783, the parish was transferred here. During the time of Provincial Father Klemens Kobak and Guardian Father Paweł Gracowski, upper floors were built to the south and east in 1847. O.A.M.D.G.".
- A late-Baroque epitaph of black marble for Jan Ignacy Lewicki, Castellan of Livonia (1769–1778, died 1788), and his wife Marcjanna née Tarnawiecka (died 1754), funded by their son Samuel Rogala-Lewicki, with a Latin inscription.
- An epitaph for Father Hieronim Konopka (18 August 1876–8 August 1944), reading: "Rests in the Lord. Brother Hieronim Konopka, lived in the order for 46 years. Buried during the front". Located near the church crypt.
- A plaque commemorating the 300th anniversary of the Union of Lublin (1569), placed in 1869 by the Austro-Hungarian Sanok administration, the city's oldest commemorative plaque. Inscription: "Commemoration of the Union of Lublin 1869". Originally on the "empty square" near the monastery, a 1887 proposal to move it to the tower facade was rejected. On 15 June 1893, the City Council approved its relocation to the church's front wall.
- An epitaph for Kazimierz Wiktor, crafted in 1908, reading: "To Kazimierz Wiktor, owner of Zarszyn, born 1845 in Niebocko, died 1903 in Kraków. A faithful son of the homeland, beloved brother, from the Sanok landowners, 1908".
- A plaque commemorating the 966–1966 millennium, placed around 1976 on a pillar between the left nave and altar.
- A plaque reading: "To Our Lady of Consolation on the 400th anniversary of her reign in the Sanok land, the Franciscans and devotees offer a tribute of gratitude. Sanok, 12 May 1996". Unveiled on 12 May 1996 during a Mass by Cardinal Józef Glemp. Located in the St. Maximilian Kolbe chapel.
- A plaque reading: "In memory of the 400th anniversary of the cult of Our Lady of Consolation. Gathered at Sanok's Market Square with Józef Cardinal Glemp, Primate of Poland. Franciscans and devotees of Our Lady of Consolation. Sanok, 12 May 1996". Placed on the facade at the church entrance.

== Events ==
- 1 November 1851 – Emperor Franz Joseph I of Austria attended Mass at 5:30 AM during his Galician journey.
- 1 April 1966 – Mass concelebrated by Cardinal Karol Wojtyła.
- 19 March 2005 – Establishment of the church as the Sanctuary of Our Lady of Consolation – Lady of the Sanok Land by Archbishop Józef Michalik.
- 11 December 1977 – Celebration of the 600th anniversary of the Franciscans' arrival in Sanok, during which a solemn Mass was celebrated by Bishop Tadeusz Błaszkiewicz.
- 10 May 1998 – During the indulgence celebration, Bishop Stefan Moskwa consecrated the renovated chancel and the altar in the church.

== Clergy and related people ==
- Father Franciszek Leszczyński (late 17th century)
- Father Piotr Karwowski
- Father Anzelm Cedzicki (until ca. 1831)
- Father Honorat Warnicki (from ca. 1831 to ca. 1834)
- Father Rafał Żak (from ca. 1834 to ca. 1838)
- Father Innocenty Nycz (from ca. 1838 to the 1840s)
- Father Kasjan Detz (in the 1840s)
- Father Paweł Gracowski (2nd half of the 1840s)
- Father Wawrzyniec Ferentsak (until ca. 1858)
- Father Kornel Motylewicz (from ca. 1858 to ca. 1867)
- Father Edmund Pawlik (from ca. 1867 to ca. 1868)
- Father Klemens Kobak (from ca. 1868 to ca. 1871)
- Father Piotr Kowalik (from ca. 1871 to ca. 1874)
- Father Romuald Piechowicz (from ca. 1874 to ca. 1879)
- Father Samuel Rajss (from ca. 1879 to ca. 1880)
- Father Wacław Fudala (from ca. 1880 to ca. 1881)
- Father Ambroży Trybalski (from ca. 1881 to ca. 1882)
- Father Placyd Krupiński (from ca. 1882 to ca. 1883)
- Father Urban Ochęduszka (from ca. 1883 to ca. 1884)
- Father Kasjan Serwin (from ca. 1884 to ca. 1886)
- Father Józef Szczyrek (from ca. 1886 to ca. 1889)
- Father Cyprian Chęciński (from 1889 to ca. 1890)
- Father Norbert Sobolewski (from ca. 1890 to ca. 1891)
- Father Franciszek Pyznar (from ca. 1892 to ca. 1897)
- Father Alojzy Karwacki (from 1895 to 1899)
- Father Feliks Bogaczyk (from 1899 to ca. 1902)
- Father Andrzej Knurek (from ca. 1901 to ca. 1902)
- Father Alojzy Karwacki (from 1902 to January 1904)
- Father Zygmunt Tomczykowski (from January 1904)
- Father Remigiusz Duda (from ca. 1904 to ca. 1905)
- Father Paweł Pelczar (from ca. 1905 to ca. 1908)
- Father Feliks Bogaczyk (from 1908 to 1910)
- Father Jan Warchał (from 1910 to ca. 1916)
- Father Kazimierz Siemaszkiewicz (from ca. 1916)
- Father Wawrzyniec Pomianek (in the 1920s)
- Father Edward Kustroń (until ca. 1930)
- Father Kazimierz Siemaszkiewicz (from ca. 1930/1931)
- Father Wincenty Boruń (until ca. 1934)
- Father Bartłomiej Szczyrba (ca. 1934/1935)
- Father Zbigniew Młynik
- Father Teofil Bazan (2nd half of the 1930s)
- Father Ernest Białek
- Father Otton Szmyd (from January 1947 to September 1953)
- Father Jakub Półchłopek (1950s)
- Father Benedykt Porzycki (1960s)
- Father Alan Chrząstek (late 1960s)
- Father Honoriusz Miś (1975–1977)
- Father Błażej Wierdak (1977–1983)
- Father Ludwik Szetela (1989–1992)
- Father Roman Pałaszewski (1992–1996)
- Father Edward Staniukiewicz (1996–2000)
- Father Stanisław Glista (2000–2008)
- Father Zbigniew Kubit (2008–2016)
- Father Bartosz Pawłowski (from 2016)

During the operation of the Sanok parish at the parish church (until 1886), the then-vicar, later Bishop Karol Fischer, began his priestly service (from September 1879 to the end of 1880). At the end of the 19th century, Father Kazimierz Żuliński, a January Uprising participant, resided in the monastery. From 1899 to 1901, and again from 1938 to 1942, Father Euzebiusz Pelc was a monk in the monastery; he died in the Auschwitz concentration camp. Father Benigny Chmura resided in the monastery from 1914 to 1935. In 1934, Father Władysław Bachuta was temporarily interned in the monastery.

Others in the monastery included, among others: Father Hilary Pracz-Przyczyński (1929–1935), Father Wacław Niewodowski (–1953), Father Radosław Bulsiewicz (–1985), Father Salezy Kucharski (1928–2001), Father Franciszek Patryjak (1944–2005), Father Andrzej Deptuch (1919–2015). At the end of the 20th century, the monastery was served by Father Tadeusz Pobiedziński (until 1989), Father Marek Daukszewicz, Father Marek Andrzejewski, Father Anicet Sajek (the latter two were catechists at the Economic Schools Complex). From 26 July 1972 to 1 November 2015, Father Andrzej Deptuch was part of the monastery community, at the time of his death the oldest Franciscan monk in the province and the oldest priest in the Archdiocese of Przemyśl. Until 2017, the parish was served by Father Piotr Marszałkiewicz (catechist at the Karol Adamiecki School Complex No. 1 in Sanok, also a chaplain for the STS Sanok ice hockey club).

Before 1913, the Sanok Franciscan convent was part of the Sanok branch of the Galician Economic Society. In 2009, the Sanok Franciscan fathers received the Sanok Mayor's Award. The tomb of the Sanok Franciscans is located at the Central Cemetery in Sanok.

Since 4 October 1998, Jacek Szuba has been the organist at the church.

== In culture ==
- Poet Roman Bańkowski dedicated poems to two brothers from the monastery, published in the poetry collection Byli wśród nas – inni (They Were Among Us – Others) in 2000: Br. Zeno was commemorated in the poem Stare organy (Old Organ), and Br. Celestyn was honored in the poem Zakrystian (Sacristan).
- Poet Jan Szelc wrote a poem on 10 September 2006 titled Do sanockiej Pani (To the Lady of Sanok), celebrating the image of Our Lady of Consolation and the Franciscan church in Sanok.

== Bibliography ==
- Pobiedziński, Witold (2007). Przewodnik po kościele i klasztorze Franciszkanów w Sanoku [A Guide to the Church and Monastery of the Franciscans in Sanok] (in Polish). Sanok: Muzeum Historyczne w Sanoku. ISBN 978-83-60380-12-3.
- Szmyd, Otton (1977). Jubileusz 600-lecia OO. Franciszkanów w Sanoku [600th Anniversary Jubilee of the Franciscan Fathers in Sanok] (in Polish). Sanok: Parafia Podwyższenia Krzyża Świętego i Matki Bożej Pocieszenia w Sanoku.
