= St. Michael's Square, Sanok =

Square in the Downtown district of Sanok, Poland

St. Michael's Square
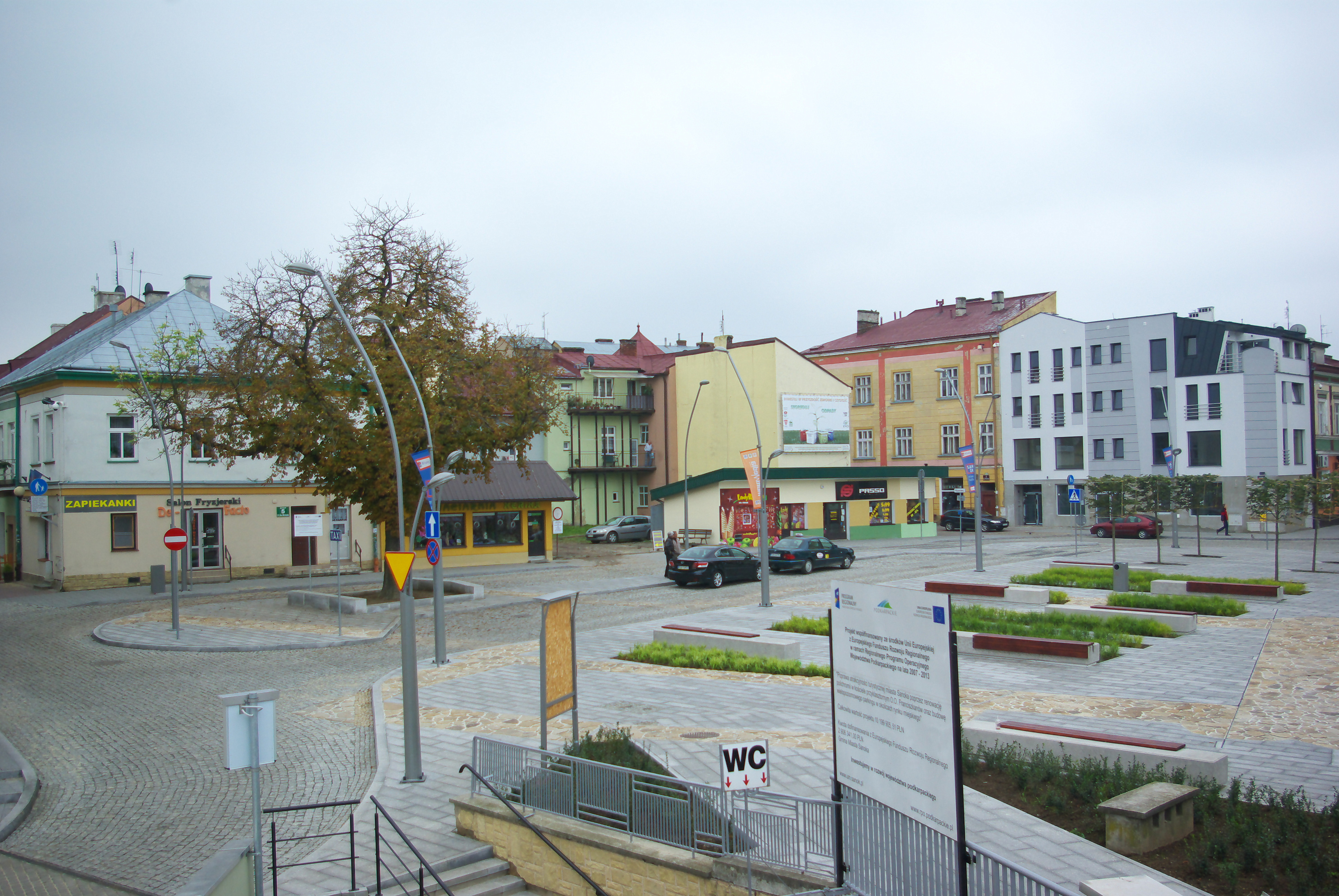
- St. Michael's Square (condition after revitalization in 2013)
- Native name: Plac św. Michała (Polish)
- Former name(s): Mansjonarski Square, Peace Square, Small Market Square
- Location: Sanok, Downtown
- Coordinates: 49°33′39.5″N 22°12′19.5″E

St. Michael's Square (formerly Mansjonarski Square, Peace Square, Small Market Square) is a square in the center of Sanok, Poland.

== History ==
Located in the Downtown district of Sanok, St. Michael's Square is situated near the Church of the Transfiguration and the Market Square, behind the tenements of the market's frontage, along the main Jan Grodek Street leading from the Market Square to National Road 84. The square is intersected by Józef Piłsudski Street (from east to west), with Gregory of Sanok Street extending south and Łazienna Street extending north. The square is named after Saint Michael the Archangel.

The square was formed in 1784 after the leveling of the burial cemetery belonging to the Church of St. Michael the Archangel. Historically, it was called Mansjonarski Square due to the canons residing in the adjacent western building. Until 1944, it served as a spacious market and parking area for merchants and a venue for fairs.

Until 1919, it was known as Celny Square (Customs Square). During World War II, under the German occupation from 1939 to 1944, it was renamed Danziger Freiheitsplatz (Gdańsk Freedom Square). During the Polish People's Republic, it was called Peace Square. In December 1989, by resolution of the Sanok Municipal Council, Peace Square was renamed St. Michael's Square.

The square is commonly referred to as the "Small Market Square in Sanok" to distinguish it from the "Large Market Square", i.e., the Market Square.

In 1989, a taxi stand was established on the square. Since 1998, the square has been managed by the city of Sanok.

Excavations in 1890 uncovered Roman denarii of Emperors Vespasian and Nerva. In 1960, during construction work, Roman denarii of Hadrian, Marcus Aurelius, and Faustina the Younger were unearthed. Since 2010, revitalization of St. Michael's Square and adjacent streets has been underway as part of the seventh stage of the city's "Sanok Cultural Heritage Park" program, which previously included the reconstruction of the Market Square. The revitalization was completed in 2013. In December 2011, archaeological excavations on John III Sobieski Street, parallel to St. Michael's Square, uncovered remains of a churchyard cemetery under archaeological supervision. Since 2012, further archaeological work on the square uncovered human skeletons, coins, and remains of the church where King Władysław II Jagiełło married Elizabeth Granowska in 1417.

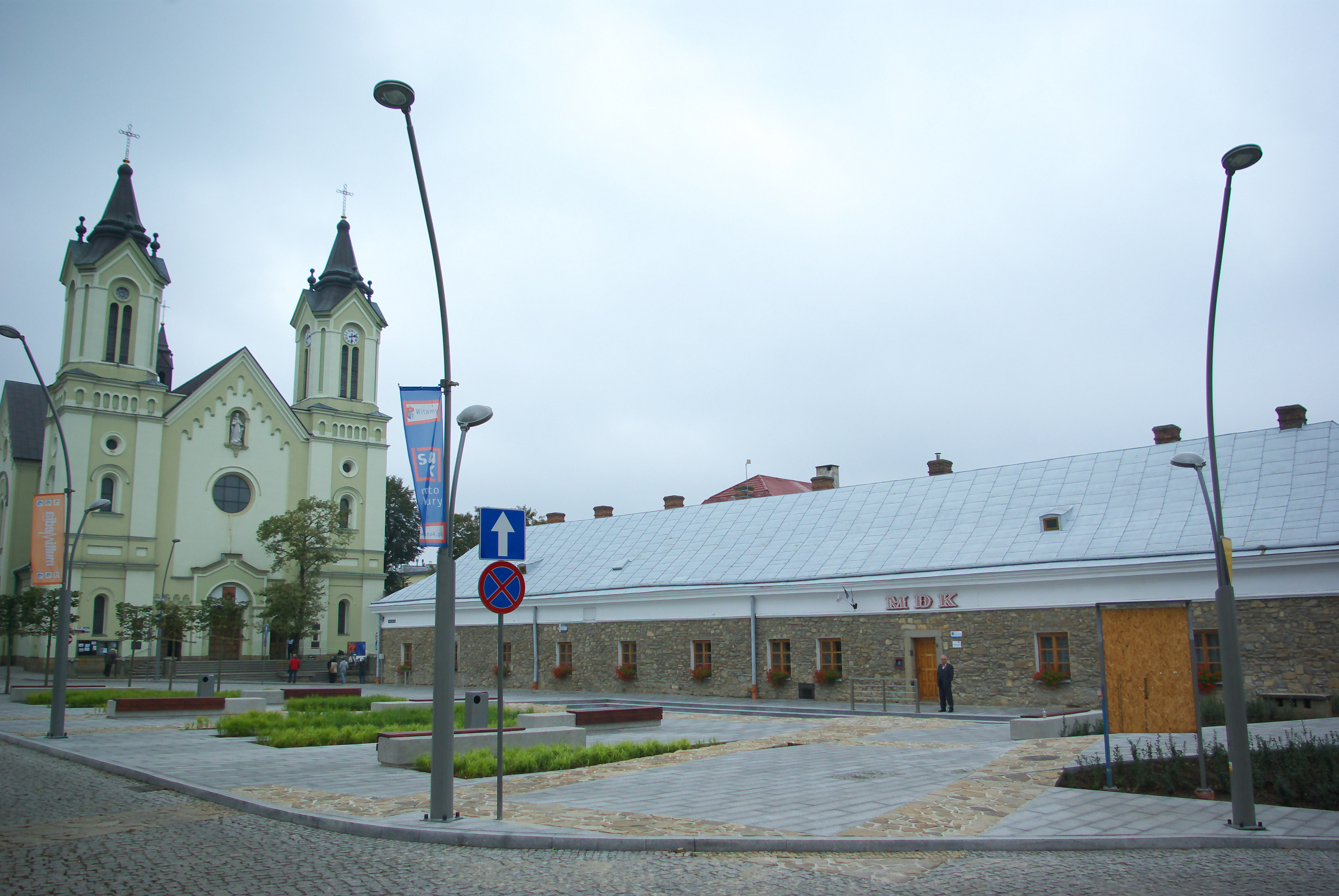
St. Michael's Square, view from the northeast

At the intersection with Jan Grodek Street grows a chestnut tree, planted before 1912 by the Sanok City Beautification Society (founded in 1904), which is a tourist attraction.

== Buildings ==
- Church of the Transfiguration, a 19th-century structure with the tombstone of Sanok starosta Sebastian Lubomirski from 1558. The building is listed in the voivodeship (1990) and municipal registers of Sanok monuments.
- Mansjonarski House from the 18th century at 6 St. Michael's Square. During the Polish People's Republic, it was listed at 5 Peace Square. It is listed in the voivodeship (1952) and municipal registers of Sanok monuments.
- Tenement at 3 St. Michael's Square, located on the northern side at the intersection with Łazienna Street, listed in the 2015 municipal register of Sanok monuments.
- Tenement at 5 St. Michael's Square, located on the northeastern side at the intersection with Jan Grodek Street, listed in the 2015 municipal register of Sanok monuments.
- A building in the eastern part of the square, home to a confectionery shop colloquially known as "U Popka", operated by Piotr Popek. In 1998, a shoe store was established there.
- On 17 November 2018, a statue of St. Michael the Archangel was unveiled on the square, dedicated by Archbishop Adam Szal. The bronze sculpture, designed by Agnieszka Świerzowicz-Maślaniec and Marek Maślaniec, stands 5 meters tall including its pedestal. The construction project was designed by architect Mariola Sidor. The statue's shield bears the Latin inscription "Quis ut Deus" (Who is like God), a traditional attribute of the saint.
