= Chapel of St. Maximilian Maria Kolbe =

Rectoral chapel in Sanok, Poland

- Kaplica św. Maksymiliana Marii Kolbego (Polish)
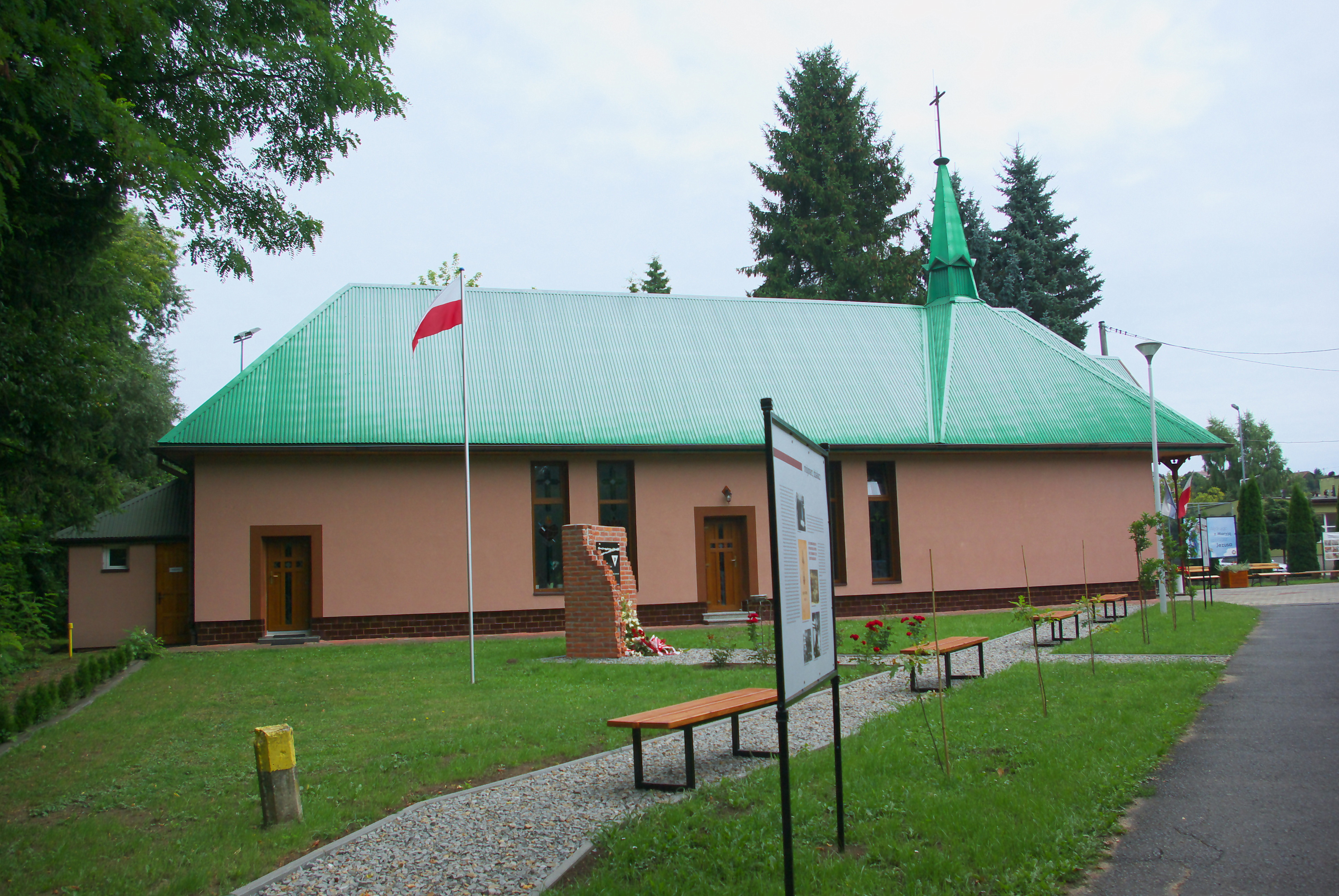
- Rectoral chapel
- Chapel of St. Maximilian Maria Kolbe
- 49°33′21″N 22°12′4.8″E
- Location: Sanok, Subcarpathian Voivodeship
- Address: 10 Zagrody Street
- Country: Poland
- Denomination: Catholic Church
- Churchmanship: Roman Catholic
- Website: maksymilian.przemyska.pl

History
- Dedication: Maximilian Kolbe

Administration
- Parish: Parish of the Transfiguration

Chapel of St. Maximilian Maria Kolbe is a Roman Catholic chapel located within the Parish of the Transfiguration in Sanok, Poland. The chapel is situated at 10 Zagrody Street, in the southern part of the Downtown district, above the Płowiecki Stream.

== History ==
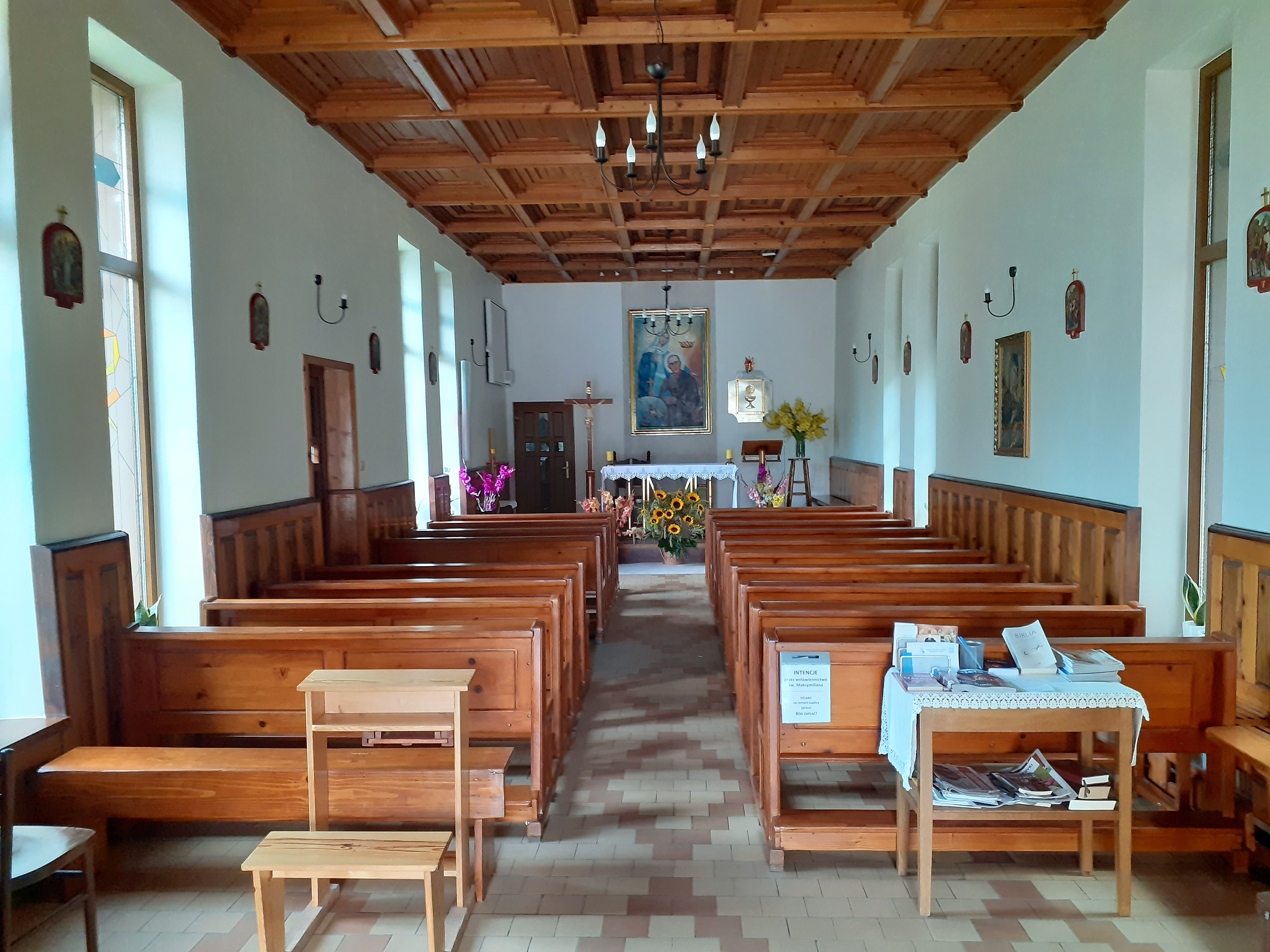
Interior of the chapel

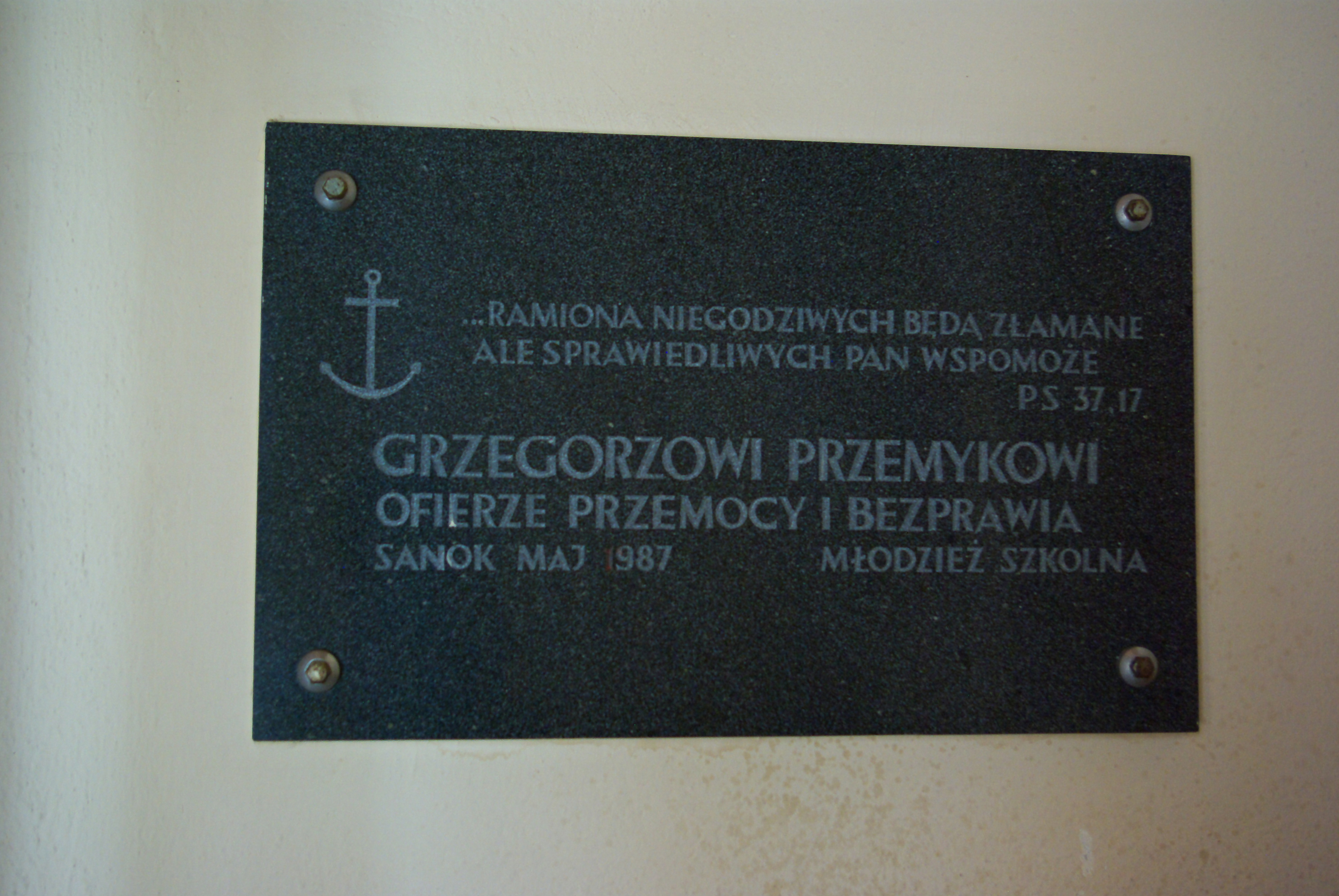
Plaque commemorating Grzegorz Przemyk

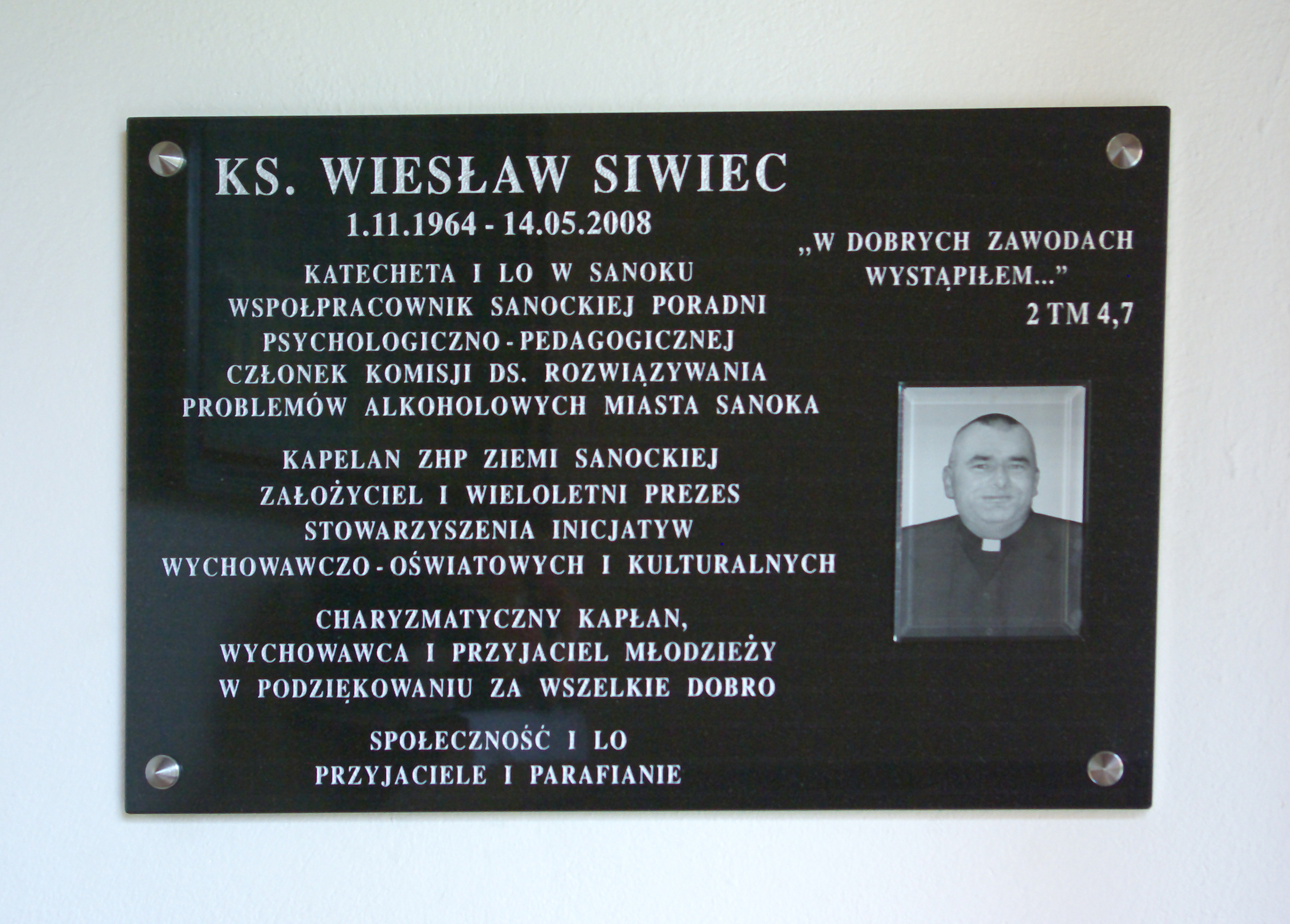
Plaque dedicated to Father Wiesław Siwiec

The chapel occupies a site that was part of a 34-hectare agricultural estate owned by the Franciscan friars in Sanok. On 8 May 1950, communist authorities of the Polish People's Republic nationalized this land without compensation. The monastery retained only 194 ares (approximately 2 hectares) on the city center side of the railway line, which included farm buildings, a residential house, and a garden. In 1973, half of this remaining land, including farm buildings and part of the garden, was expropriated with compensation, and the site was used to build the First General High School in Sanok.

In 1973, Bishop Tadeusz Błaszkiewicz issued a decree establishing a public chapel in the former residential building. The chapel was dedicated by Bishop Błaszkiewicz on 3 February 1974 and opened that year, primarily serving youth and the elderly.

On 15 December 1983, the Franciscan Provincial Chapter, and on 28 December 1983, the Przemyśl Bishop's Curia, agreed to transfer the chapel to the Archdiocese of Przemyśl.

On 24 March 1984, Father Krzysztof Pacześniak was appointed rector of the chapel, assuming the role in July 1984 after serving in the Parish of the Transfiguration. Since 1981, he had been a chaplain at the Sanok Specialist Hospital, and from September 1984, he also served as a catechist at the nearby First High School.

On 14 March 1985, Bishop Ignacy Tokarczuk visited the rectorate and decided to renovate a farm building to house the chapel. During the renovations, the building was dedicated by Bishop Tadeusz Błaszkiewicz on 16 June 1985.

In 2016, Father Krzysztof Pacześniak retired as rector. Father Jacek Michno became the chapel's priest in 2016, and was succeeded by Father Michał Kozak in 2019.

== Commemorations ==
A plaque in the chapel commemorates Grzegorz Przemyk (1964–1983). Initiated by Father Adam Sudoł, it was installed by Marian Witalis and Marian Kunc. Funded by school youth, it was unveiled on 30 May 1987. The inscription, quoting Psalm 37:17, reads: "…the arms of the wicked shall be broken, but the Lord upholds the righteous PS 37,17. To Grzegorz Przemyk, victim of violence and lawlessness. Sanok, May 1987. School Youth". In the 20–31 July 1987 issue of Gazeta Sanocka – Autosan, editor-in-chief Wiesław Koszela protested the plaque's installation in an article titled Jeszcze jedna tablica i jeszcze jedno pytanie: w czyim imieniu? (Another Plaque and Another Question: In Whose Name?).

On 15 August 2021, during the patronal feast, ceremonies marked the unveiling of a monument near the chapel commemorating victims of German concentration camps on the 80th anniversary of St. Maximilian Kolbe's death, as well as honoring his legacy around the chapel.
