= Zygmunt Gorazdowski =

Polish saint

Saint Zygmunt Gorazdowski
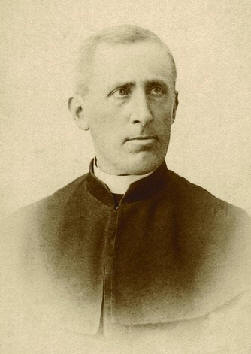
- Born: 1 November 1845; Sanok, Podkarpackie, Kingdom of Galicia and Lodomeria, Austria-Hungary (now Poland)
- Died: 1 January 1920 (aged 74); Lwów, Republic of Poland (now Lviv, Ukraine)
- Venerated in: Catholic Church
- Beatified: 26 June 2001, Lviv Hippodrome, Ukraine by Pope John Paul II
- Canonized: 23 October 2005, Saint Peter's Square, Vatican City by Pope Benedict XVI
- Major shrine: Saint Giles Church, Wrocław, Poland
- Feast: 1 January
- Attributes: Priest's attire
- Patronage: Sisters of Saint Joseph; Sanok

Zygmunt Gorazdowski (1 November 1845 – 1 January 1920) was a Polish Roman Catholic priest and the founder of the Sisters of Saint Joseph. Gorazdowski suffered from tuberculosis during his childhood which impeded his studies for the priesthood and which required him to take time off in order to recover before he could be ordained. Once he was ordained he served in various parishes while setting up homes for orphans and single mothers as well as hospices and other establishments for a range of people; he was a prolific writer of catechism and other religious notes for the benefit of his flock.

The cause for his canonization opened on 1 June 1989 and he became titled as a Servant of God at the onset of the cause; the confirmation of his model life of heroic virtue allowed for him to be titled as Venerable while Pope John Paul II beatified him on his visit to Ukraine on 26 June 2001. Pope Benedict XVI later canonized him as a saint on 23 October 2005 in Saint Peter's Square.

== Life ==
Zygmunt Gorazdowski was born on 1 November 1845 in Sanok to the politician Szczęsny Gorazdowski (c.1813-May 1903) and Aleksandra Łazowska; his parents had married in 1843 and his paternal grandparents were Szymon Gorazdowski and Maria Dobrzańskich. He was baptized on 9 November 1845 at a Franciscan church. In his childhood he suffered a lung ailment that became tuberculosis; this did not prevent him from considering the needs of others and offering his help wherever he could. He almost died in 1846 during the Galician slaughter that saw peasants revolt against serfdom and he managed to survive when his parents hid him under a mill's wheel. In 1863, he joined the uprising against the Russian occupation.

Once he completed his high school studies in Przemyśl in 1864, he enrolled in law in Lviv at the college. But he decided to cease his legal studies in 1865 and he decided to commence ecclesial studies for he felt a strong call to the priesthood; he began his studies for the priesthood in 1866 at the Latin Catholic Institute. His poor health (tuberculosis) became a hindrance to his studies and he had to undergo a prolonged period of intensive medical treatment from 1869 to 1871. But this did not impede his path to the priesthood for he was ordained as such on 21 July 1871 in the Lviv Cathedral. He celebrated his first Mass on 30 July in the church of the Benedictine Sisters at Przemyśl. Until 1877 he served as the parish vicar and the administrator at Wojniłów and Bukaczowce and then later at Gródek Jagielloński and Zydaczow. During a cholera outbreak in Wojniłów, he tended to the sick and he also laid out the bodies of the dead despite the great risk of contagion.

Throughout his priesthood he took great care to protect the spiritual health and growth of his parishioners for whom he wrote and published a catechism (1875) and other books to help parents and children. In 1877 he returned to Lviv and in 1878 was made the senior priest of the parish of Saint Nicholas; he was there for four decades while serving in schools and founding the "Bonus Pastor Association" for priests. He founded a home and a soup kitchen for the poor as well as a healthcare center for ill patients (the "Affordable Public House"); he set up an institute for poor seminarians as well as a home for single mothers and orphans (the "House of the Child Jesus") and the "Saint Joseph's Polish-German Catholic School". Gorazdowski also founded the Sisters of Saint Joseph on 17 February 1884.

He died in 1920. Those who knew him called him the "Father of the poor and priest of the homeless". In 2008, his order had 508 religious in 71 houses in places such as the Democratic Republic of Congo and France; it was aggregated to the Order of Friars Minor Capuchin in 1922. It received the papal decree of praise from Pope Pius X on 1 April 1910 and full pontifical approval from Pope Pius XI on 3 August 1937.

== Canonization ==
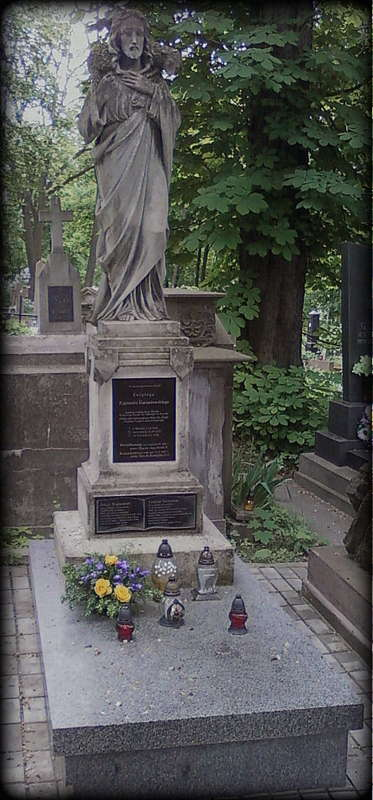
Tomb.

The canonization cause opened on 1 June 1989 after the Congregation for the Causes of Saints issued the official "nihil obstat" and titled him as a Servant of God; the diocesan phase commenced in the Lviv archdiocese on 29 June 1989 and concluded sometime later before all documents were sent in boxes to the C.C.S. in Rome who validated the process on 26 November 1993. The Positio dossier was sent to the C.C.S. in 1993 for investigation with the theologians approving its contents on 8 June 1999 and the C.C.S. following suit on 15 November 1999. His life of heroic virtue received approval from Pope John Paul II who titled him as Venerable on 20 December 1999.

One miracle required approval for his beatification; one such case was investigated and then sent to the C.C.S. in Rome who validated the diocesan investigation on 25 February 2000; a medical board approved this case on 18 January 2001. Theologians likewise approved it on 27 March 2001 as did the C.C.S. on 23 April 2001. John Paul II approved this miracle on 24 April 2001 and beatified Gorazdowski at the Lviv Hippodrome on his visit to Ukraine on 26 June 2001. The second and definitive miracle for sainthood was investigated in a diocesan process that closed on 8 September 2003 and later received C.C.S. validation. Medical experts approved it on 24 June 2004 as did the theologians on 21 September 2004 and the C.C.S. on 16 November 2004. John Paul II approved this miracle on 20 December 2004; Cardinal Angelo Sodano formalized the date for sanctification in a consistory on 24 February 2005 on the behalf of the ill John Paul II. The pope died over a month later and his successor Pope Benedict XVI canonized Gorazdowski on 23 October 2005 in Saint Peter's Square.
