= Church of the Transfiguration, Sanok =

Church in Sanok, Poland

Church of the Transfiguration
- Kościół Przemienienia Pańskiego w Sanoku
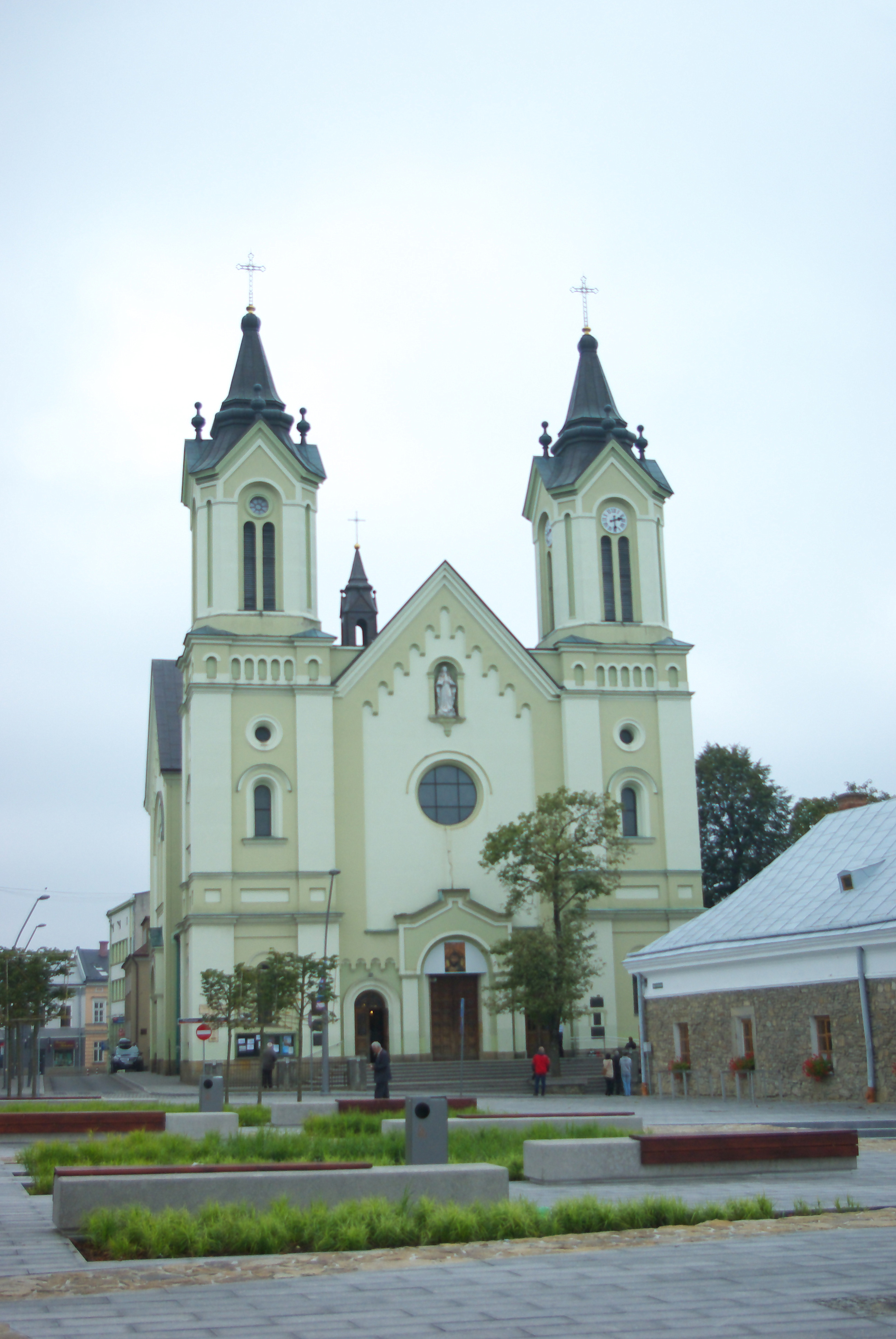
- Church building (2013)
- Church of the Transfiguration
- 49°33′38.5″N 22°12′17″E
- Location: Sanok, Poland
- Denomination: Catholic
- Churchmanship: Roman Catholic
- Website: www.fara.sanok.pl

History
- Dedication: Transfiguration of Jesus
- Dedicated: 1886

Architecture
- Architect: Józef Braunseis
- Style: Romanesque Revival
- Years built: 1874–1886

Specifications
- Materials: Brick, stone

Administration
- Parish: Parish of the Transfiguration, Sanok

The Church of the Transfiguration is a Romanesque Revival temple in Sanok of the Roman Catholic Parish of the Transfiguration, Sanok, located at St. Michael's Square, commonly referred to as the "Fara".

The building adjoins Gregory of Sanok Street to the east and Wałowa Street to the west.

== History and architecture ==
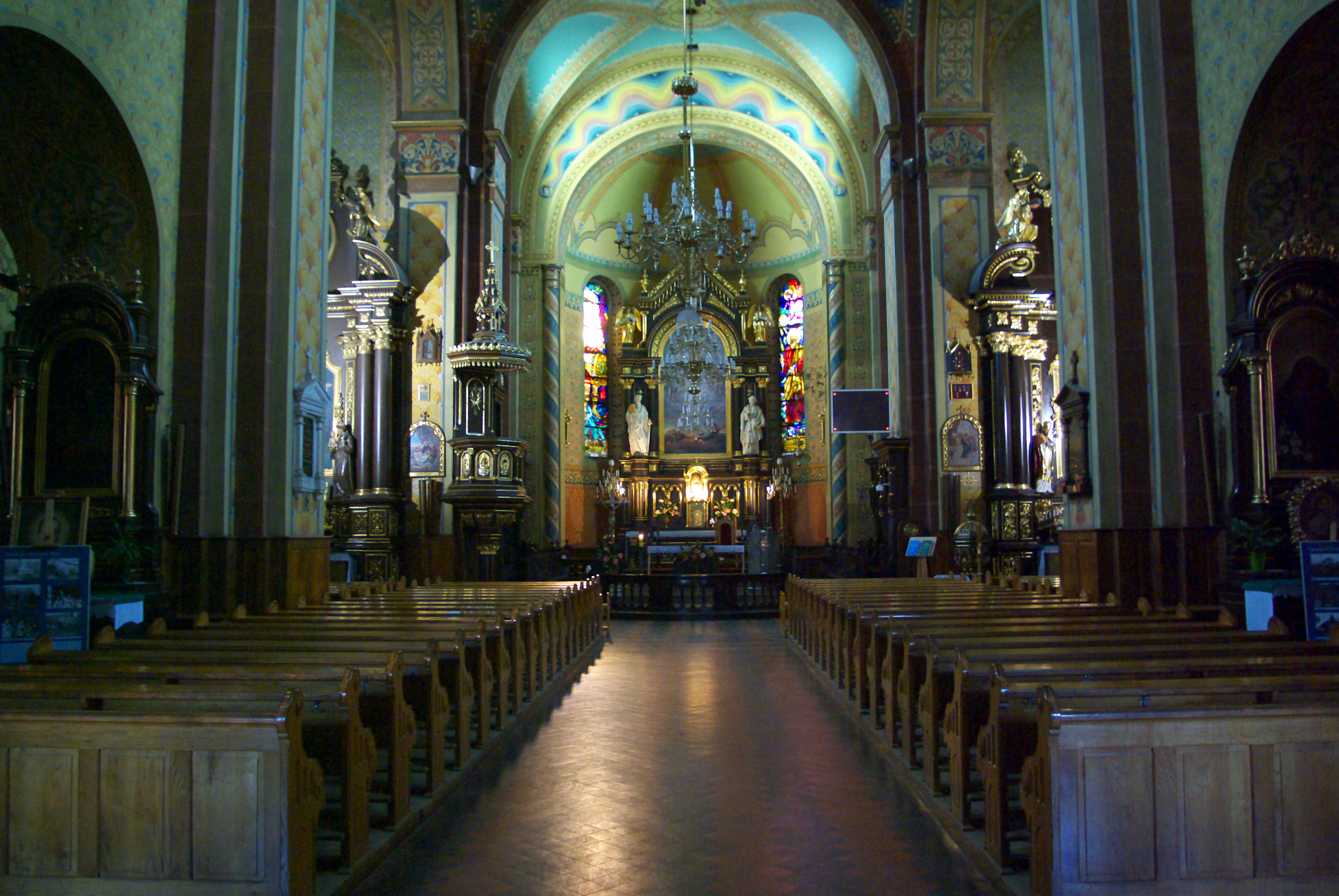
Interior of the church

The Church of the Transfiguration stands on the site where the Gothic Church of Michael the Archangel, Sanok once stood, which was completely destroyed by fire in 1782 and never rebuilt. On 17 October 1868, the Sanok City Council rejected a proposal to allocate land on the existing St. Michael's Square for the construction of a new church.

The church was built through the efforts of the then-parson, Father Franciszek Salezy Czaszyński, who, upon arriving in Sanok, made it his mission to construct a new church, saving funds for this purpose. Fundraising began during the tenure of Sanok's mayor, Erazm Łobaczewski, who served from 1867. Contributions for the church's construction came from the imperial court (8,458 PLN), Father Franciszek Salezy Czaszyński himself (6,200 PLN), and parishioners. Additional funds were raised through the sale of burial plots at the Central Cemetery, Sanok.

Construction took place between 1874 and 1886. The cornerstone was laid on 31 July 1874. The church was designed in the Romanesque Revival style by the chief engineer of the Viceroyalty, Józef Braunseis. The church was built as a brick, oriented structure on a rectangular plan, featuring a taller main nave and two lower transverse side naves. Initially, it had two entrances: one to the main nave from St. Michael Square and another to the eastern transverse nave from Gregory of Sanok Street (the latter was sealed in November 1939). The building was completed in a rough state in 1886, and on 16 December 1886, the city engineer permitted its use. On 14 December 1886, the Przemyśl consistory granted permission for Father Franciszek Salezy Czaszyński to dedicate the church on the Fourth Sunday of Advent, 19 December 1886. The parish was then transferred from the Franciscan monastery. The first Mass, a Christmas Midnight Mass, took place on 24 December 1886. At that time, the church was not fully finished, lacking plaster and flooring. On 25 August 1900, the church was visited by the Viceroy of Galicia, Leon Piniński.

Finishing work continued in subsequent years. In July 1895, new organs, crafted by Antoni Konieczny of Jasionów, were inaugurated. The completion of the church was overseen by the next parson, Father Bronisław Stasicki, who added two towers between 1903 and 1906, constructed by the company of Karol Gerardis. During the 1996–1997 renovation, an inscription was discovered in one of the towers, stating it was "built in 1904 by Karol Gircerski under the supervision of Eng. Ostrowski, with crosses made by Bazyli Wojtowicz and gilding of the orbs by Aleksander Piech". A clock and three bells, named Maria, Joseph, and Michael, were ordered from Karol Szwabe's foundry in Biała and dedicated by Bishop Józef Sebastian Pelczar on 23 October 1904. A pulpit, stained glass windows, altars, and Secession-style polychrome decorations were added between 1906 and 1907 by A. Domański, based on designs by Antoni Popiel. The church was dedicated by Przemyśl suffragan bishop Jakub Glazer on 12 June 1897. The city of Sanok contributed stones from its quarry, 60 oaks from its forest, and a grant for the purchase of the tower clock.

The original church bells were destroyed by the Austrians in 1917 during World War I, thrown onto the square in front of the church. According to another account, they were requisitioned in September 1917, along with organ pipes in 1918. In 1921, the Bell Construction Committee organized a metal collection to cast new bells, which were purchased and dedicated in 1925. The church was electrified in 1928. In 1972, the church's polychrome decorations were restored. That same year, it was added to the updated Sanok register of monuments. The building was also listed in the provincial (1990) and municipal registers of Sanok monuments. In 1978, the Sanok branch of the Polish Tourist and Sightseeing Society's Monument Preservation Committee placed a plaque on the façade, indicating the building's historical significance.

On 28 December 1986, celebrations marked the centenary of the church's construction. In September 1996, a renovation began, including roof replacement and façade restoration. From 2 to 6 August 1997, celebrations were held for the centenary of the church's dedication. A publication by Edward Zając, titled Parafia Przemienienia Pańskiego w Sanoku. W stulecie konsekracji 1897–1997 (Parish of the Transfiguration in Sanok. On the Centenary of the Dedication 1897–1997), was released to commemorate the event.

Priests who served in the parish include Dr. Józef Drozd, Father Ludwik Stanisławczyk, Father Franciszek Witeszczak, Father Jakub Mikoś, Canon Paweł Rabczak, Father Antoni Wołek Wacławski, and Father Captain Roman Kostikow.

== Sculptures and monuments ==
- A sculpture of the Virgin Mary as the Immaculate Conception by Stanisław Piątkiewicz, created between 1903 and 1906 to mark the 50th anniversary of the Immaculate Conception dogma, is located on the front façade.
- A statue of the Virgin Mary is located in the church porch on the left side.
- A cross on the eastern façade at Gregory of Sanok Street bears inscriptions: "Christ yesterday, today, and forever" and "Holy Year 2000". Adjacent plaques list places of martyrdom – "Katyn, Kharkiv, Dachau, Miednoje, Auschwitz" – commemorating victims of the Katyn massacre. A nearby plaque reads: "To those who died defending faith, church, and homeland. Sanok residents, A.D. 1998". The cross was dedicated on the parish feast day, 6 August 1998.
- A monument to Pope John Paul II stands beside the church, initiated and funded by former prelate Father Adam Sudoł. Unveiled in June 2011, it was created by Marek Maślaniec and Agnieszka Świerzowicz.
- A commemorative stone, marking the holy missions of 1–8 April 2017, stands in front of the church with the inscription: "The love of Christ compels us (2 Cor 5:14). Parish evangelical missions 1–8 April 2017".

== Commemorative plaques ==
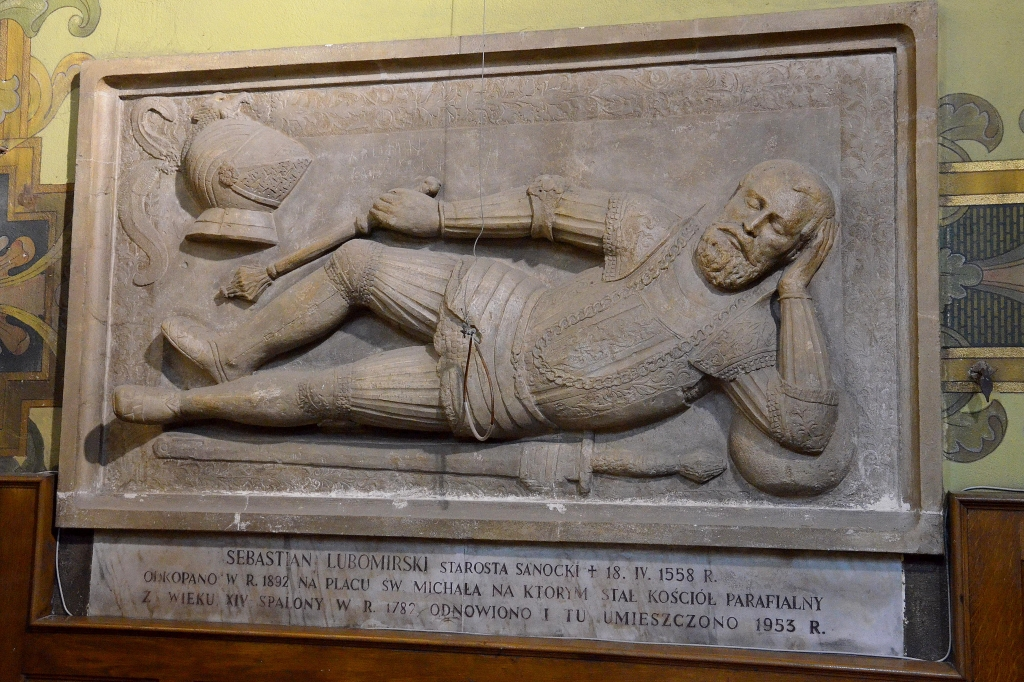
Epitaph of Sebastian Lubomirski

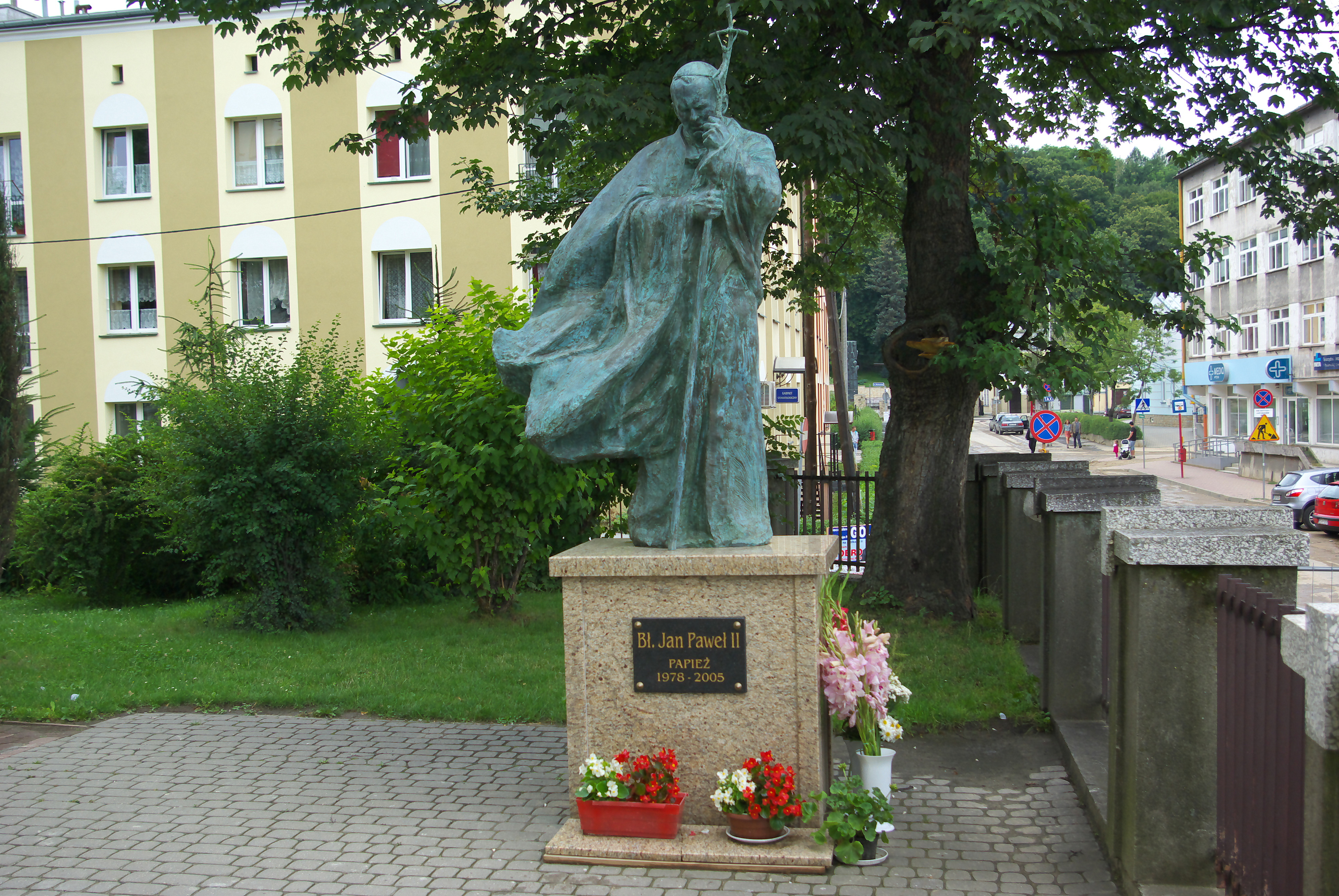
Monument to John Paul II beside the church

- The 1558 tombstone of Sanok starosta Sebastian Lubomirski (d. 1558), originally from the Church of Michael the Archangel, Sanok, was unearthed in 1892 at St. Michael Square and placed in its current location in 1953. The inscription reads: "Sebastian Lubomirski, Sanok starosta, † 18 April 1558. Unearthed in 1892 at St. Michael Square, where the 14th-century parish church stood, burned in 1782. Restored and placed here in 1953".
- An epitaph commemorating Father Franciszek Salezy Czaszyński (1811–1898), the church's main benefactor, reads: "D.O.M. To the late Father Franciszek Czaszyński, born 1812, died 1898, pastor and main benefactor of the church, grateful parishioners. R.I.P".
- An epitaph for Zygmunt Boleść Kozłowski (1831–1893), funded by the Sanok Land nobility, reads: "D.O.M. To Zygmunt Boleść Kozłowski, born 1 May 1831, died 9 October 1893, long-time Sanok deputy, grateful nobility of this land. With courage and strength of spirit, he fought for the rights of the church and nation, leaving a worthy example for posterity. Honor to his memory".
- A plaque commemorating the 500th anniversary of the Battle of Grunwald in 1410, initiated by Autosan factory director Ludwik Eydziatowicz and crafted by Adam Lewanowicz, was unveiled on 29 June or 15 July 1910. It reads: "In memory of the 500th anniversary of the momentous victory of Polish arms at Grunwald 1410–1910".
- A plaque with a bust of John III Sobieski, marking the 250th anniversary of the Battle of Vienna on 12 September 1683, reads: "John III Sobieski, King of Poland, 17 July 1629–17 June 1696. On the 250th anniversary of the victory at Vienna and the salvation of Christianity from the Turkish invasion". It was unveiled by Father Bartłomiej Krukar on 1 October 1933.
- A plaque commemorating Józef Piłsudski (1867–1935) features a quote: "To win and rest on laurels is defeat. To be defeated and not yield is victory". The main inscription reads: "Józef Piłsudski 1867–1935. Founder of the Legions, victorious commander in the 1920 war for independence, distinguished statesman, first marshal of the Republic. On the 50th anniversary of his death and the 65th anniversary of the victorious 1920 war. In deep homage, the Sanok community. A.D. 1985". Dedicated on 26 May 1985 by Przemyśl suffragan bishop Tadeusz Błaszkiewicz, it was attended by surviving Legionnaires. Designed and crafted by Jerzy Bieda, the plaque faced opposition from an anonymous author (signed "OB.W.") in an article titled W czyim imieniu? in Gazeta Sanocka – Autosan issue 19, 1–10 July 1985. According to Father Adam Sudoł and Franciszek Oberc, the author was the newspaper's editor-in-chief, Wiesław Koszela. Koszela later admitted authorship in an article titled O tym 'w czyim imieniu?' raz jeszcze in issue 22, 1–10 August 1985, elaborating his objections to Piłsudski's actions during the Second Polish Republic.
- A Golgota of the East Cross in the form of a relief commemorates victims of the Katyn massacre. Established as part of the "Golgota of the East – Poland Remembers" initiative by Father Zdzisław Peszkowski, a Sanok native and Kozelsk camp survivor, it was unveiled on 18 November 1995 to mark the 55th anniversary of the Katyn massacre. The bronze relief, measuring 210 x 120 cm, was cast in Grudziądz and funded by Solidarity. It features Our Lady of Katyn with radiating beams, the Polish Armed Forces eagle, and inscriptions listing Katyn, Kozelsk, Ostashkov, Starobilsk, and "Golgota of the East", with a sash reading "Help us forgive 1940". Father Peszkowski delivered the homily during the unveiling Mass.
- A plaque commemorating the soldiers of the Service for Poland's Victory-Union of Armed Struggle-Home Army Sanok District and their commanders – Michał Tokarzewski-Karaszewicz, Tadeusz Bór-Komorowski, and Leopold Okulicki – as well as the soldiers of the 2nd Podhale Rifles Regiment, who were stationed in Sanok until 1939. The inscription reads: "To the soldiers of the ZWZ-AK Sanok District (SZP-ZWZ) AK and their Commanders-in-Chief: Gen. M. Tokarzewski 'Torwid', Gen. S. Rowecki 'Grot', Gen. T. Komorowski 'Bór', Gen. L. Okulicki 'Niedźwiadek'. To the soldiers of the 2nd Podhale Rifles Regiment. On the 42nd anniversary of the departure of the Południe partisan unit. The People of the Sanok Land. A.D. 1986". The plaque was unveiled on 6 July 1986 by Edward Łabno, an officer of the pre-war Sanok regiment, and blessed by the Home Army chaplain, Prelate Jan Stączek. The initiative for the plaque came from Marian Witalis and Father Adam Sudoł. In issue no. 21 of Gazeta Sanocka – Autosan, dated 20–31 July 1986, editor-in-chief Wiesław Koszela published an article Dzielić i rządzić?!, expressing opposition to the plaque's installation. His arguments were supported by Władysław Gąsiorowsk and Mirosław Musiał, whose letters to the editor appeared in issue no. 23 of the newspaper, dated 10–20 August 1986.
- A plaque commemorating the 25th anniversary of Solidarity (1980–2005) quotes Father Jerzy Popiełuszko (25 September 1983): "Only a nation free in spirit and loving the truth can endure and create for the future".
- A plaque marking the 80th anniversary of the Union of Siberian Exiles in 1928 was unveiled during Katyn Day on 13 April 2008.
- A plaque commemorating the first anniversary of the Smolensk air disaster on 10 April 2010, funded by the Social Committee for Commemorating the Victims of the Smolensk Air Disaster, was dedicated on 9 April 2011.

== Epitaphs ==
- An epitaph dedicated to Father Franciszek Salezy Czaszyński (1811–1898), the principal benefactor of the church. The inscription reads: "D.O.M. To the late Father Franciszek Czaszyński. Born 1812, † 1898. To the parson and main benefactor of the church, from grateful parishioners. R.I.P.".
- An epitaph dedicated to Zygmunt Kozłowski (1831–1893), funded by the nobility of the Sanok Land. The inscription reads: "D.O.M. To Zygmunt Boleścic Kozłowski, born 1 May 1831, † 9 October 1893. Longtime Sanok deputy – grateful nobility of this land. With courage and strength of spirit, he fought in defense of the rights of the church and the nation, leaving a worthy example for posterity to follow. Honor to his memory".

== Paintings and other objects ==
- Bronze works by Sanok artisan Aleksander Piech were donated to the church at the turn of the 19th and 20th centuries.
- Two paintings by Sanok artist Michał Leszczyński are housed in the church.
- The 1941 Stations of the Cross and a painting of St. Theresa in a side altar were created by Władysław Lisowski. Lisowski, with Maksymilian Słuszkiewicz, also decorated the Holy Sepulchre in the 1930s.
- Stained glass windows include those of St. Michael and St. Thaddeus (funded by the Rudak and Słuszkiewicz families), St. Joseph, and the Virgin Mary (funded by Eng. Wilhelm Szome and his wife Władysława in 1906). Additional windows from 1994 depict St. Brother Albert (funded by Janusz Stachowicz), St. Rafał Kalinowski, Sister Faustyna Kowalska, and Father Jerzy Popiełuszko (funded by Father Adam Sudoł), dedicated by Bishop Stefan Moskwa on 5 March 1995.
- A southern catalpa tree, planted on 14 November 2004 to mark the centenary of the Sanok Beautification Society.

== Rectory ==
From 10 May 1981 to 15 April 1989, the parish office operated from a tenement at 10 John III Sobieski Street (formerly J. Dąbrowski Street). The current rectory is located in a separate building on the southern side of the church at 5 Gregory of Sanok Street. Designed by Eng. Bogusław Hofbauer, it is nicknamed the "Sanok Belweder".

== Notable events ==
- Notable weddings in the church include those of Dr. Stanisław Domański and Janina Nowak (1905), Stanisław Borowiczka and Helena Bośniacka (1911), Józef Rec and Antonina Germak (1912), Franciszek Stok and Maria Prochaska (1913), Bronisław Jahn and Kazimiera Korczyńska (1929), and Antoni Żubryd and Janina Żubryd (1940).
- Father Zdzisław Peszkowski, a Scoutmaster, was baptized in the church on 30 October 1918.
- After 1945, musician Władysław Wiśniowski played religious melodies from the church tower.
- After his release from internment in Komańcza on 26 October 1956, Cardinal Stefan Wyszyński celebrated a Mass in the church, attended by thousands.
- On 3 February 1974, Bishop Tadeusz Błaszkiewicz dedicated the parish's filial Chapel of St. Maximilian Kolbe at Zagrody Street near the First High School.
- A burglary occurred in the church on 20 October 1984.
- Feliks Bieda served as the church organist for 25 years until his death in 1990.

== Bibliography ==
- Sudoł, Adam (1999). Polska Ojczyzna moja. Część II [Poland, My Homeland. Part II] (in Polish). Sanok: Wydanie zbiorowe.
- Sudoł, Adam (2001). Wybór z Księgi Ogłoszeń Parafii Przemienienia Pańskiego w Sanoku (lata 1967–1995) [Selection from the Book of Announcements of the Parish of the Transfiguration in Sanok (1967–1995)] (in Polish). Sanok: Kuria Metropolitarna. ISBN 83-914224-7-X.
- Zając, Edward (1997). Parafia Przemienienia Pańskiego w Sanoku. W stulecie konsekracji 1897-1997 [Parish of the Transfiguration in Sanok. On the Centenary of the Consecration 1897–1997] (in Polish). Sanok: Miejska Biblioteka Publiczna im. Grzegorza z Sanoka w Sanoku. ISBN 83-905046-4-2.
