= Jan Grodek =

Rector of Academy in Kraków, Poland from 1540 - 1552

Jan Grodek or Jan Grodek of Sanok (end of 15th century - 1554), the son of the mayor of Sanok, was a nine-time rector of the Academy in Kraków, Poland between 1540 and 1552.
