= Central Cemetery, Sanok =

Communal cemetery in Sanok, Poland

Central Cemetery in Sanok
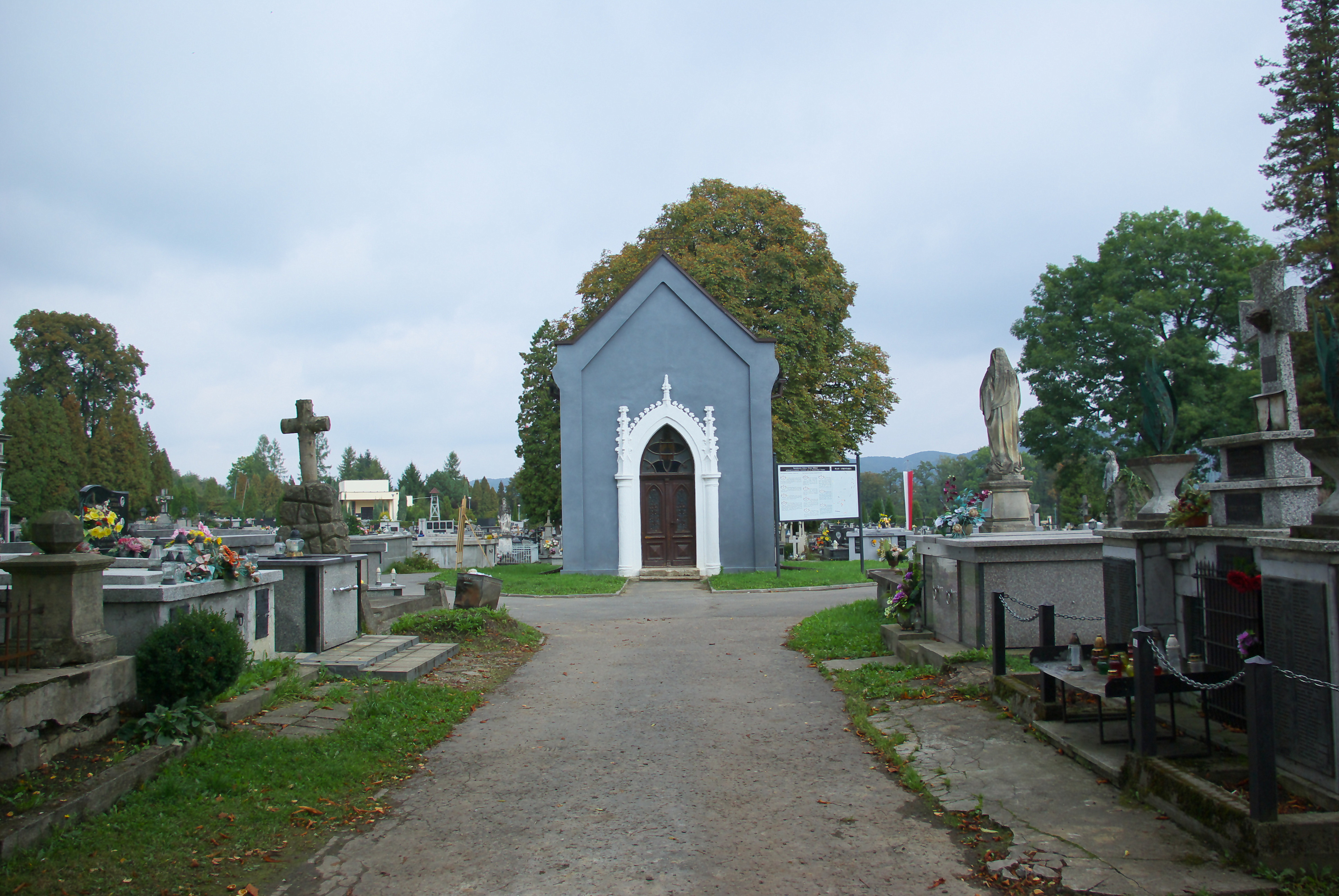
- Main cemetery avenue at 1 Rymanowska Street. The chapel is located at the central point of this section
- Interactive map of Central Cemetery in Sanok

Details
- Location: 1 Rymanowska Street, Sanok
- Country: Poland
- Coordinates: 49°33′51″N 22°11′28″E
- Type: Communal
- Owned by: City of Sanok
- Size: 79,300 m^{2} (854,000 sq ft)

The Central Cemetery is a communal cemetery in Sanok, Poland. The necropolis comprises multiple sections, beginning with the oldest at Jan Matejko Street, followed by a designed area at Rymanowska Street. Both sections are listed in the Registry of Cultural Property in Sanok. Over time, the cemetery expanded to include adjacent areas, including two soldiers' quarters, forming the current necropolis. It is one of the oldest cemeteries in the Podkarpackie Voivodeship.

== History and structure ==
=== Old section at Jan Matejko Street ===
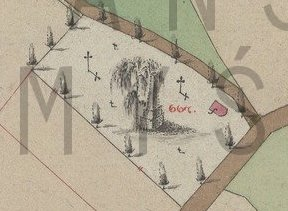
Cemetery in Sanok on a map from 1852

The original cemetery at what is now Jan Matejko Street, no longer in use, was established following a decree by Emperor Joseph II on 11 December 1783, issued by the Galician Gubernium on 21 January 1784, mandating burials outside urban areas. Previously, Sanok's cemeteries were located in the city center: a Roman Catholic cemetery around the former St. Michael the Archangel Church at the current St. Michael's Square, near Gregory of Sanok Street by the bank building at 4 Tadeusz Kościuszko Street and the Ramerówka townhouse, and Greek Catholic cemeteries near Zamkowa Street by the local cathedral and the former Church of the Nativity of the Virgin Mary at the present John III Sobieski Street, where the Karol Adamiecki School Complex and the building at 2 Teofil Lenartowicz Street are located. In the 1930s, during the Second Polish Republic, remains found during excavations at the former Catholic cemetery on Gregory of Sanok Street were transferred to the cemetery at Rymanowska Street. Some old burials at this cemetery are also associated with the nearby 2 Pułku Strzelców Podhalańskich Street.

No precise opening date for the cemetery is documented, but burials likely began in the 1790s or early 1800s. The cemetery appears on a Sanok map from 1852. According to historian Edward Zając, the cemetery was established in 1857 on land purchased from Piotr Czyżewski by the Austro-Hungarian district authority. The purchase costs were borne by local Roman and Greek Catholic parishes. Income from burial plot sales supported the construction of the local Roman Catholic parish church. The cemetery was managed by the parish committee.

On 3 April 1867, the Sanok City Council, led by Father Franciszek Salezy Czaszyński, pastor of the Parish of the Transfiguration, initiated plans for a new cemetery. Father Czaszyński chaired a committee that included councilors Michał Solski, Ignacy Kahane, Karol Pollak, Szymon Drewiński, and non-councilor Dr. Józef Demetrykiewicz. The committee identified a parcel west of the city owned by landowner Jan Tchorznicki. Despite these efforts, the plan was not finalized. On 27 July 1882, the City Council discussed establishing a new Catholic cemetery or expanding the existing one, appointing a committee with Father Czaszyński, Aital Witoszyński, Aleksander Iskrzycki, Jan Kupczyk, and Teofil Lewicki. On 14 December 1882, the council decided to acquire land from Piotr Czyżewski to expand the cemetery.

The cemetery served Christians of Roman Catholic and Protestant denominations, and after the 1784 decree, also Greek Catholics, previously buried at the Church of the Nativity of the Virgin Mary in the city center. On 20 May 1869, the City Council approved fencing the municipal cemetery. In the mid-1880s, the cemetery, managed by the Roman Catholic parish, faced criticism for chaotic burial practices, lack of fencing and pathways, and its location on marshy terrain. On 12 May 1887, councilor Aital Witoszyński proposed fencing the cemetery with a picket fence for security reasons. A 1891 press report highlighted the cemetery's neglected state. The cemetery at Jan Matejko Street was closed on 1 December 1895. On 5 October 1905, Sanok mayor Feliks Giela issued a notice urging residents and others to maintain deteriorating tombstones at the old Catholic cemetery within one year, after which damaged monuments would be removed.

In the late 20th century, Ewa Śnieżyńska-Stolot and Franciszek Stolot identified the tombstone of Antoni Lenik, an imperial-royal financial councilor who died in 1866 at age 52, as one of the oldest surviving monuments. The section at Jan Matejko Street spans 1.57 hectares and has an irregular quadrilateral shape. Its layout resembles a fan, with pathways extending westward, northwest, and northward from the entrance at the southeastern corner on Roman Dmowski Street.

=== Old section at Rymanowska Street ===
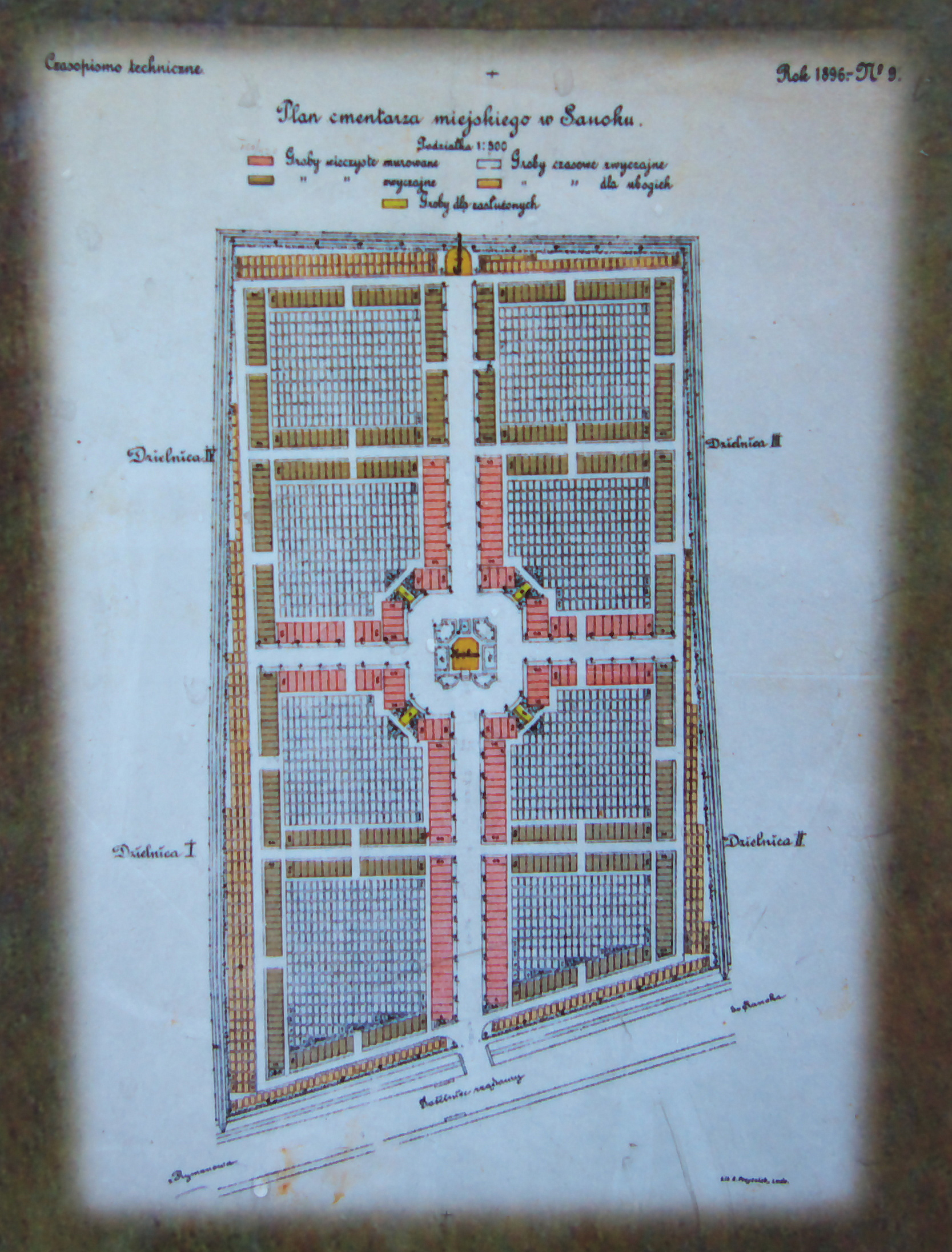
Original plan of the cemetery at Rymanowska Street by Władysław Beksiński

The creation of a new cemetery may have been driven by the need to expand the existing necropolis or to establish a dedicated Roman Catholic cemetery. On 8 June 1887, the City Council voted to establish a new necropolis for Christian residents, funded by municipal resources, with costs to be offset by future burial fees. A committee comprising Aital Witoszyński, Franciszek Bem, and Józef Rynczarski was appointed to oversee the purchase and development of the new cemetery. On 21 January 1890, the Sanok magistrate proposed acquiring 2.5 morgs of land from Józef Lisowski. On 26 August 1890, a new committee, including Dr. Jan Gaweł, Father Wasylij Czemarnyk, and Paweł Hydzik, was tasked with assessing the suitability of land owned by Franciszka Lisowska (plots 85/1, 86/1, 87/1).

The city acquired land from Józefa Rylska, approximately 1.3 km from the Market Square. On 15 March 1894, the City Council approved the purchase of three morgs of land in Posada Sanocka or Dąbrówka Polska from Józefa Rylska for 5,000 PLN. On 29 October 1894, Mayor Cyryl Jaksa Ładyżyński reported the purchase of plot 1186 from Józefa Rylska for 5,000 PLN. This plot, identified on an 1852 map as "Średnie pole" (Middle Field), formed the basis for the new cemetery.

City architect Władysław Beksiński designed the communal cemetery and a Gothic Revival funeral chapel. His design, published in 1896 in Czasopismo Techniczne, served as a model for cemetery planning in Galicia. The cemetery, covering 1.54 hectares at Rymanowska Street, was rectangular and divided into four quarters: I (southwest), II (southeast), III (northwest), and IV (northeast). Four main pathways converged at the center, where a Gothic Revival chapel was built for Józefa Habermann (died 2 May 1895) and her family, approved by city authorities for a 250 PLN perpetual endowment. Beksiński's plan allocated 2,842 burial plots: 4 for distinguished individuals, 172 permanent masonry graves, 436 permanent standard graves, and 2,230 temporary graves (including 415 for the poor). Plots along the main pathways were reserved for prominent citizens, with four central plots around the chapel, while the periphery was designated for the poor.

By July 1895, the cemetery at Rymanowska Street was equipped with a gate, fencing, hedgerows, pathways, drainage ditches, leveled terrain, and a roofed chapel. On 24 October 1895, the City Council set fees, established regulations, and appointed city gardener Józef Ursa as gravedigger. The cemetery was consecrated on All Souls' Day, 2 November 1895, in the presence of City Council members, Roman and Greek Catholic clergy, and residents. The 1898 budget allocated 600 PLN for a mortuary building. On 11 November 1895, an adjacent western section for residents of Posada Sanocka and Dąbrówka – then outside city limits – was consecrated, with trees provided by Józefa Rylska. Trees were planted along the pathways in mid-1896.

With the opening of the new cemetery at Rymanowska Street and another at Posada Olchowska, the Jan Matejko Street cemetery was closed on 1 December 1895. On 24 September 1896, councilor Dr. Jan Gaweł raised concerns about tombstones facing away from pathways, contrary to proper alignment.

The cemetery served Roman and Greek Catholic burials. Beksiński's design planned for closure after 50 years, in 1946. In 1931, the cemetery building was located at 46 Rymanowska Street. The total area, per Beksiński's design, is 2.49 hectares. Historian Stefan Stefański noted that one of the oldest surviving tombstones is that of Józef Hellebrand, a retired forest manager who died on 30 November 1898 at age 82. Two entrances, including a main gate leading to the old chapel, were established from Rymanowska Street.

At the beginning of the 20th century, a cemetery fund existed, and grave numbers were marked on posts. At that time, on All Saints' Day, 1 November, members of the Society of Saint Vincent de Paul held collections at both the old cemetery (J. Matejko Street) and the new one (Rymanowska Street). In the second half of the 20th century, on All Saints' Day, 1 November, a solemn Roman Catholic Mass was celebrated by the historic chapel in the cemetery.

=== Current area and state ===
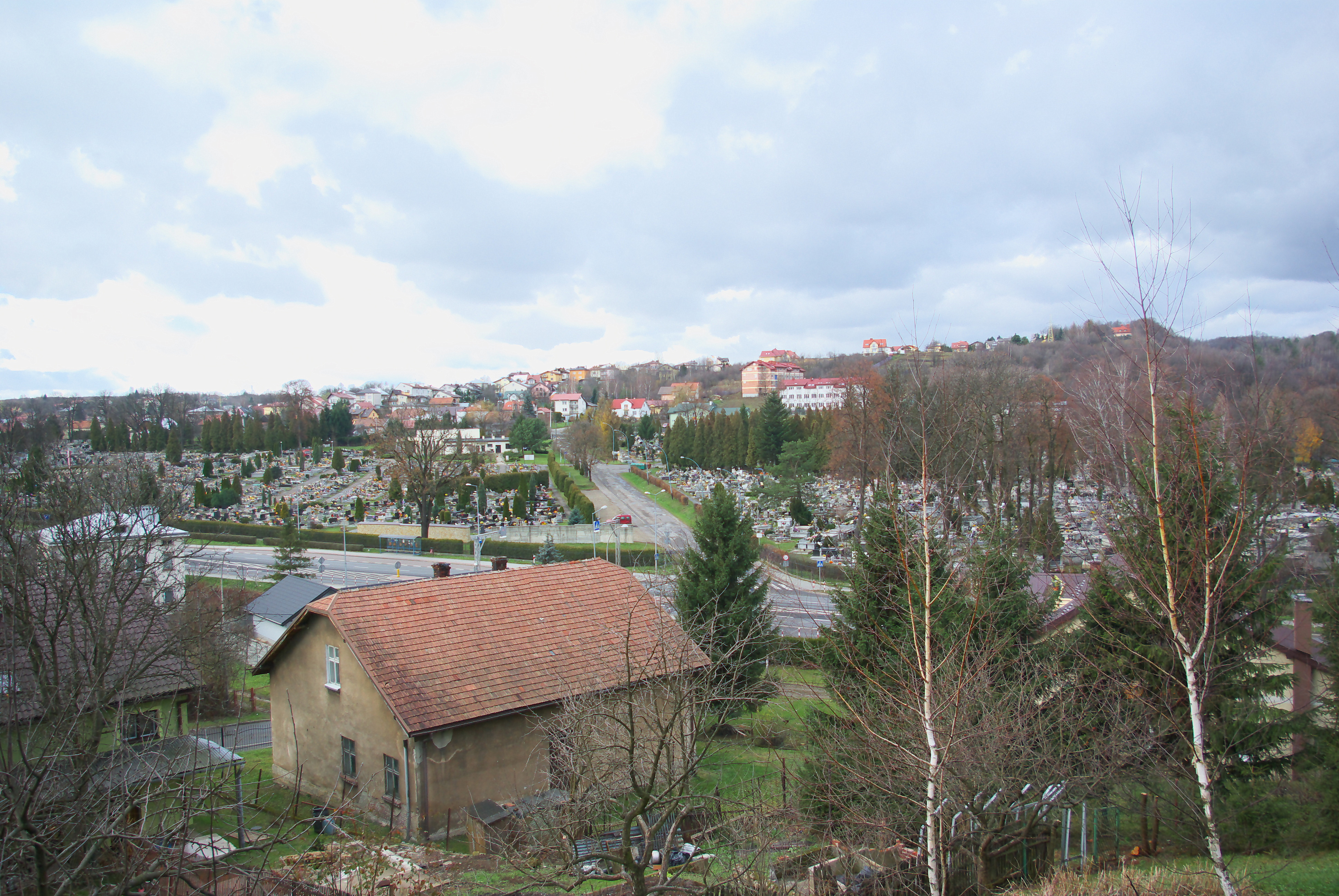
Central Cemetery in Sanok, view from the east from Adam Mickiewicz Park. The Jan Matejko Street section is on the right, with the Rymanowska Street section extending to the left

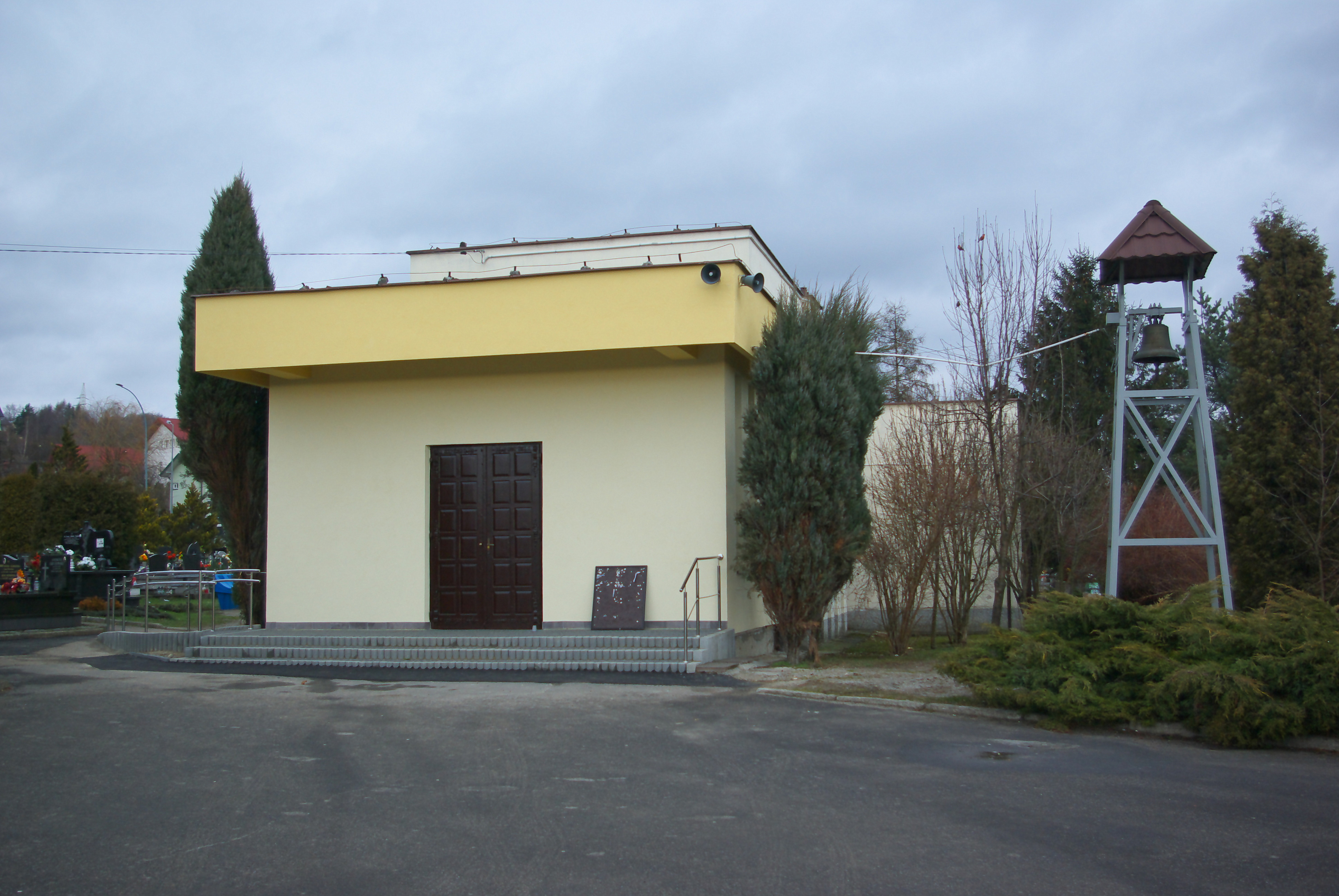
Funeral chapel (2017)

Over time, the cemetery area was expanded by incorporating adjacent land. After burial space was exhausted at the old cemetery on Rymanowska Street, a special cemetery commission in 1921 recommended continuing interments at the old cemetery on Matejko Street, suggesting the purchase of adjacent plots. A resolution by the City Council on 22 August 1922 approved exchanging other land to the owners of the plots adjoining the old cemetery on Matejko Street. In modern times, the expansion proceeded westward from the original cemetery areas along Matejko and Rymanowska streets, and land between the two parts was also incorporated, resulting in a unified cemetery area encompassing both existing and newly added grounds. In the late 1970s and early 1980s, burials took place in the so-called "new section" of the Matejko Street cemetery in an "Avenue of the Meritorious", where individuals associated with the Polish People's Republic regime were laid to rest. In the early 1980s, efforts were undertaken to integrate the burial areas on and around Jan Matejko Street. Eventually, the Central Cemetery came to encompass the area bounded by the streets Rymanowska, Roman Dmowski, Kiczury, Głogowa, and Dąbrowiecka. The entire cemetery area is crossed by Jan Brzechwa Street. On the side of Głogowa Street, the Central Cemetery borders the new Jewish cemetery. At the center of the current cemetery grounds stands a municipal funeral home, whose construction began in 1988. The interior polychromes were created by Tadeusz Marian Turkowski. Also in 1988, Urban Jawień proposed the renovation and marking of graves belonging to individuals meritorious to the city.

Human remains uncovered between 1935 and 1936 at the site of the former Church of the Blessed Virgin Mary were buried at the cemetery. During archaeological work on Zamkowa Street near the local Orthodox church, human remains – likely from a 17th-century cemetery – were also discovered and subsequently transferred to the Sanok cemetery.

In July 1987, the cemetery was the site of break-ins into some of its oldest burial crypts and coffins, which were looted and robbed. Between late 1994 and early 1995, several acts of vandalism occurred at the cemetery, resulting in damage to gravestones, the Insurgents Cross, and military burial plots. In 2000, a new fence was erected along Rymanowska Street, 500 juniper shrubs were planted, and several pathways were renovated. In the early 21st century, two columbarium walls were built along the cemetery's western edge, parallel to Roman Dmowski Street, designed to house cremation urns (the first wall includes 80 niches). By resolution of 21 July 2011, the Sanok City Council introduced the Regulations for Municipal Cemeteries located within Gmina Sanok.

As of 1 August 2012, vehicular traffic through the cemetery along Jan Brzechwa Street, between its junctions with Roman Dmowski and with Dąbrowiecka and Głogowa streets, was prohibited by city authorities for legal and safety reasons. The cemetery remains accessible at all hours via pedestrian gates. In spring and summer 2014, renovation and modernization works were carried out, including the construction of a parking lot, the beginning of a fence around the Polish soldiers' burial section, and conservation works. Later in 2014, the parking lot was completed, the interior of the funeral chapel was renovated and modernized, two cemetery alleys were asphalted, and a second columbarium wall was built, providing 120 burial niches accessible from both sides. Until 2015, the cemetery was managed by a private funeral company. On 1 May 2017, the Sanok Municipal Housing Management Company took over administration on behalf of the City of Sanok.

The total area of the Central Cemetery is just under 8 hectares (79,300 m²). As of 2019, the cemetery plan identifies six zones:

- 1 – the old section along Rymanowska Street, including plots for Polish soldiers and Red Army soldiers;
- 2 – the area between the old Rymanowska section and Jan Brzechwa Street;
- 3 – the grounds surrounding the funeral chapel;
- 4 – the old section along Jan Matejko Street;
- 5 – a triangular area at the intersection of Jan Brzechwa and Głogowa streets;
- 6 – the section adjacent to Głogowa and Kiczury streets.

In 1991, the newly established Society for the Development and Beautification of the City of Sanok announced a fundraising campaign to preserve historic tombstones. On All Saints' Day (1 November) and All Souls' Day (2 November), fundraising collections are held at the Central Cemetery by the Association for the Care of Old Cemeteries in Sanok and the Saint Brother Albert Aid Society – Sanok Branch. Members of the Sanok Region Scouting Troop, named after Father Scoutmaster Zdzisław Peszkowski, have taken responsibility for maintaining several graves of soldiers and scouts.

=== Military quarters and burials ===
After the end of World War II, a military cemetery was established in the northern part of the old Rymanowska Street section, consisting of two quarters: one for Polish soldiers and one for Red Army soldiers, with a total area of 1,650 m². In 1958, the area was enclosed with a hedge, and the war graves were renovated by city authorities.

==== Pre-1918 military cemetery ====
Historically, the cemetery contained graves of Austrian army soldiers. As of June 1914, there were graves of 34 officers and 67 soldiers. Subsequently, during World War I, 8,700 soldiers who perished were buried at the Sanok cemetery (designated as No. XIV in Austro-Hungarian nomenclature). Across the entire Sanok District, 12,247 soldiers were buried. After Poland's regained independence in 1918, in the 1920s, during the Second Polish Republic, this was one of three military cemeteries within the city of Sanok, covering an area of three-quarters of a Morgen and enclosed by a wooden fence. At that time, approximately 9,000 graves of those who died between 1914 and 1918 were estimated to exist, marked by wooden crosses, and their condition was deemed poor. A second military cemetery, located within the municipal cemetery, covered 50 m² with an unknown number of burials. This area, surrounded by concrete, featured three masonry monuments, one erected by Russians and another by Hungarians. By 1930, the military cemetery contained fallen soldiers from the Austrian and Russian armies, as well as Italians who died in captivity. Until then, the cemetery was maintained by Austrian, Russian, and later Polish authorities.

After 1945, a monument with an inscription in Polish and German, "Mass grave of the 32nd Regiment", was present, identifying "Laszlo Garganyi" and topped with a crown. A preserved postcard indicates the existence of a grave for four Hungarian honvéd soldiers who died suddenly. Later, the Austrian military graves were removed, likely after World War II, and new graves were established in their place.

==== Polish soldiers' quarter ====
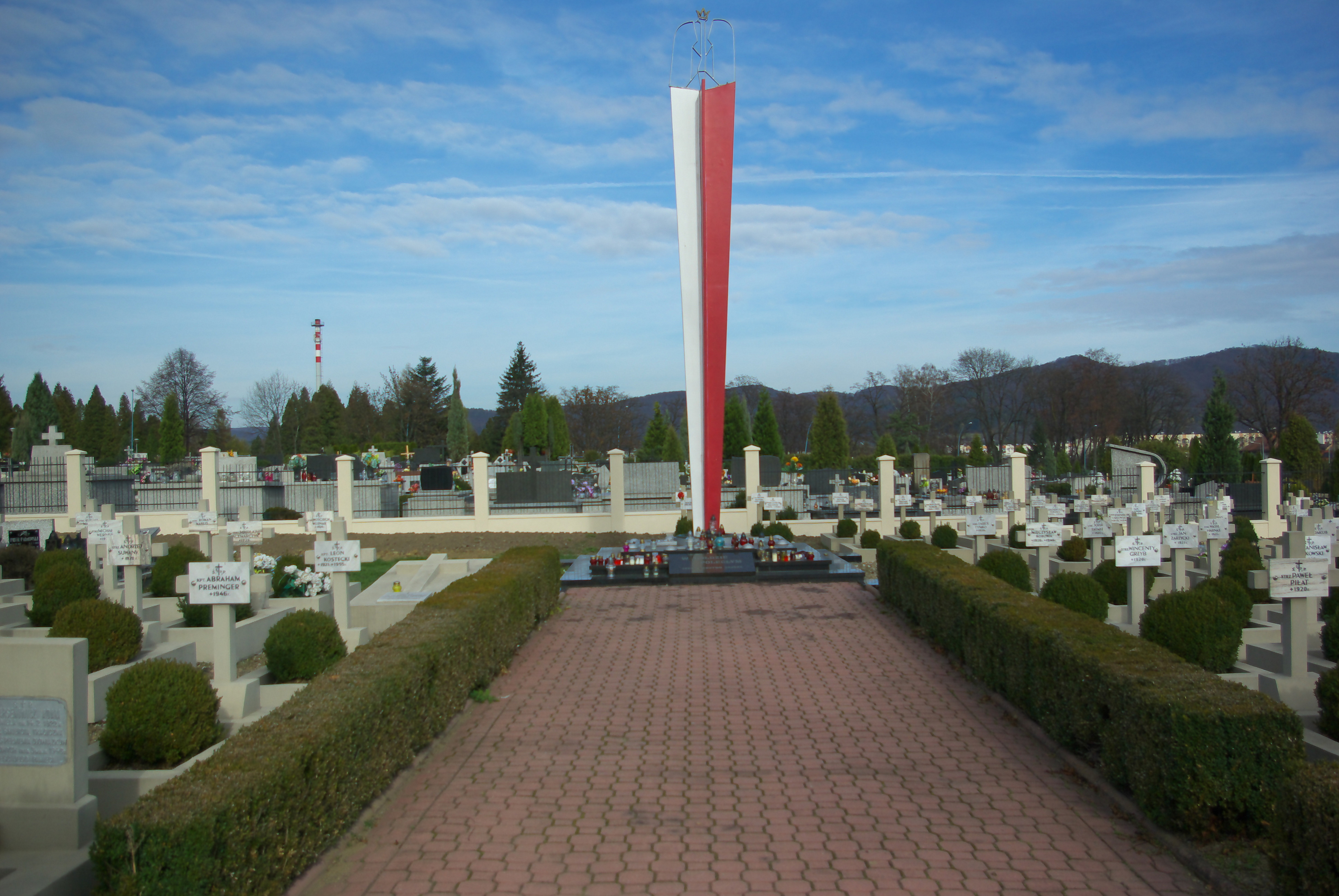
Polish soldiers' quarter with a commemorative monument

The cemetery includes a quarter for soldiers and officers of the Polish Armed Forces who died in battles for liberation between 1918 and 1948, including the Polish–Ukrainian War (1918–1919), the Polish–Soviet War (1919–1920), the Polish Defensive War of 1939, and conflicts with the Ukrainian Insurgent Army (1944–1948). According to a 1920s description, the third military cemetery, for those who fell in wars from 1918, was located north of the second cemetery (with the three monuments). It contained approximately 300 graves, marked by wooden crosses, most of which were deteriorated, and was enclosed by wire. In the 1930s, Captain Father Roman Kostikow of the military parish of Christ the King, established at the 2nd Podhale Rifle Regiment stationed in Sanok, organized the quarter for soldiers who died between 1918 and 1920. Initially, there were 105 graves. The quarter includes burials of soldiers from the 2nd Podhale Rifle Regiment, as well as those who fought with the 8th Dresden Infantry Division, the Internal Security Corps, and the Border Protection Forces. Among those buried are:

- Lieutenant Colonel Karol Lenczowski (1891–1936, recipient of the Virtuti Militari, commander of the 2nd Podhale Rifle Regiment from 1935 to 1936),
- Private Jan Goryl (1924–1946, Virtuti Militari recipient),
- Officers of the 8th Dresden Infantry Division killed by the Zuch Battalion under Captain Antoni Żubryd:
  - Major Abraham Preminger (1918–1946, head of the Political-Educational Department, executed),
  - Lieutenant Colonel Teodor Rajewski (1916–1946, Soviet officer, chief of staff, killed in a skirmish),
  - Corporal Stefan Strzelczyk (1923–1947, driver during a military inspection in the Bieszczady Mountains on 28 March 1947, during which General Karol Świerczewski was killed),
  - Second Lieutenant Józef Krysiński,
- Officers of the 34th Budziszyn Infantry Regiment:
  - Second Lieutenant Mieczysław Walesiuk (1906–1946, city commandant; his remains were later transferred to Białystok, leaving a symbolic tombstone in the quarter),
  - Captain Leon Kostecki (1911–1955, platoon commander).

Additionally, four graves belong to Polish Armed Forces soldiers who died tragically in later years of the Polish People's Republic. The quarter also includes soldiers who lived long after World War II, buried in the 1960s, 1970s, and 1980s:

- Second Lieutenant Zbigniew Królicki (died 1962, aged 23),
- Sergeant Kazimierz Kokoszka (1946–1978),
- Piotr Palmowski (1907–1983),
- Senior Warrant Officer Karol Gurgacz (1941–1983), and his wife Maria (1942–2006).

In 1958, approximately 50 victims of a mass execution by Germans in December 1943 in Babica near Rzeszów were reinterred in the quarter after exhumation.

The quarter contains 154 individual graves, two mass graves (one in the northwest corner with 10 victims), and one symbolic mass grave with a monument. The monument features a vertical flag of Poland with an eagle at the top. It bears a Virtuti Militari cross and a plaque inscribed: "In homage to the fallen. Sanok community". Designed by Edmund Królicki and overseen by Tadeusz Wilk, the monument was completed before 1 November 1959. The quarter was surrounded by a hedge for many years. Between 1980 and 1983, renovations included installing uniform concrete crosses with white marble identification plaques on each grave.

Between 2011 and 2012, the graves were renovated, including repainting. In 2013, plans were made to fence the quarter. In 2014, the western half of the surrounding hedge was replaced with fencing.

==== German burials from 1939 ====
After the outbreak of World War II, soldiers of the Wehrmacht who fell during the September Campaign of 1939 were buried at the Rymanowska Street cemetery. Their remains were exhumed in 1995 and reinterred at the military cemetery in Przemyśl, consecrated on 7 October 1995.

==== Red Army soldiers' quarter ====
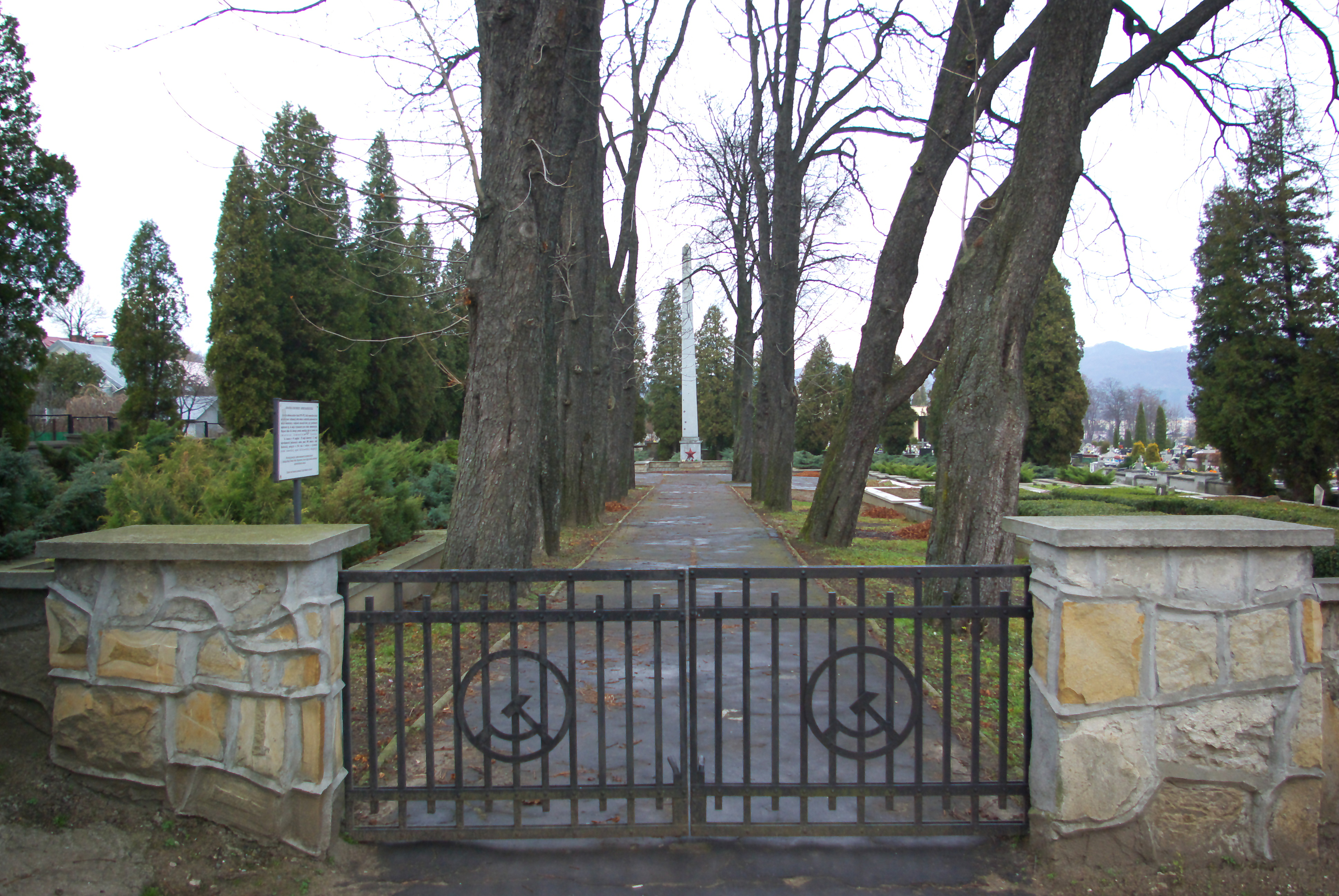
Red Army soldiers' quarter: Entrance gate with communist symbols

In the western part of the Central Cemetery lies the Red Army soldiers' quarter, established on the site of a former Austrian soldiers' cemetery, which was leveled for this purpose. Exhumations of Red Army soldiers' remains across the Rzeszów Voivodeship were conducted by a special expedition group from the Ministry of Municipal Economy, with the permanent military cemetery in Sanok nearing completion by late 1953. The quarter contains soldiers who died in 1944 during battles on the Eastern Front for the so-called liberation of the Sanok Land. The deceased were from the 101st Army Corps of the 38th Army of the 1st Ukrainian Front. Initially, Red Army soldiers were buried in Sanok's city center on the eastern slope of Adam Mickiewicz Park and elsewhere in Sanok County, with their remains later exhumed by the Municipal Economy Enterprise and transferred to the cemetery quarter. Later sources date the cemetery's establishment to 1951–1953, during which exhumations occurred.

A total of 2,969 soldiers were buried in the quarter. Over time, individual plaques commemorating specific soldiers were added, with inscriptions in Polish, Russian, Ukrainian, Armenian, and Georgian. Buried soldiers include Majors Michaił Kalmus and Iosif Niepran, Captains Nikołaj Gietmanski and Aleksandr Hulewicz, Senior Lieutenant Nikołaj Gass, and Kłara Sołonienko.

A main avenue, lined with chestnut trees, leads from the gate to a commemorative obelisk with a red star at its center, measuring 4 m x 4 m = 16 m² at the base. During the Polish People's Republic, the graves were maintained by Sanok scouts and the city's Polish–Soviet Friendship Society branch. Until the 1980s, school students cleaned the graves before the October Revolution holiday (7 November). In 2012, six mass graves in the quarter were renovated.

=== Commemorative and historic monuments ===
==== Insurgents Cross ====
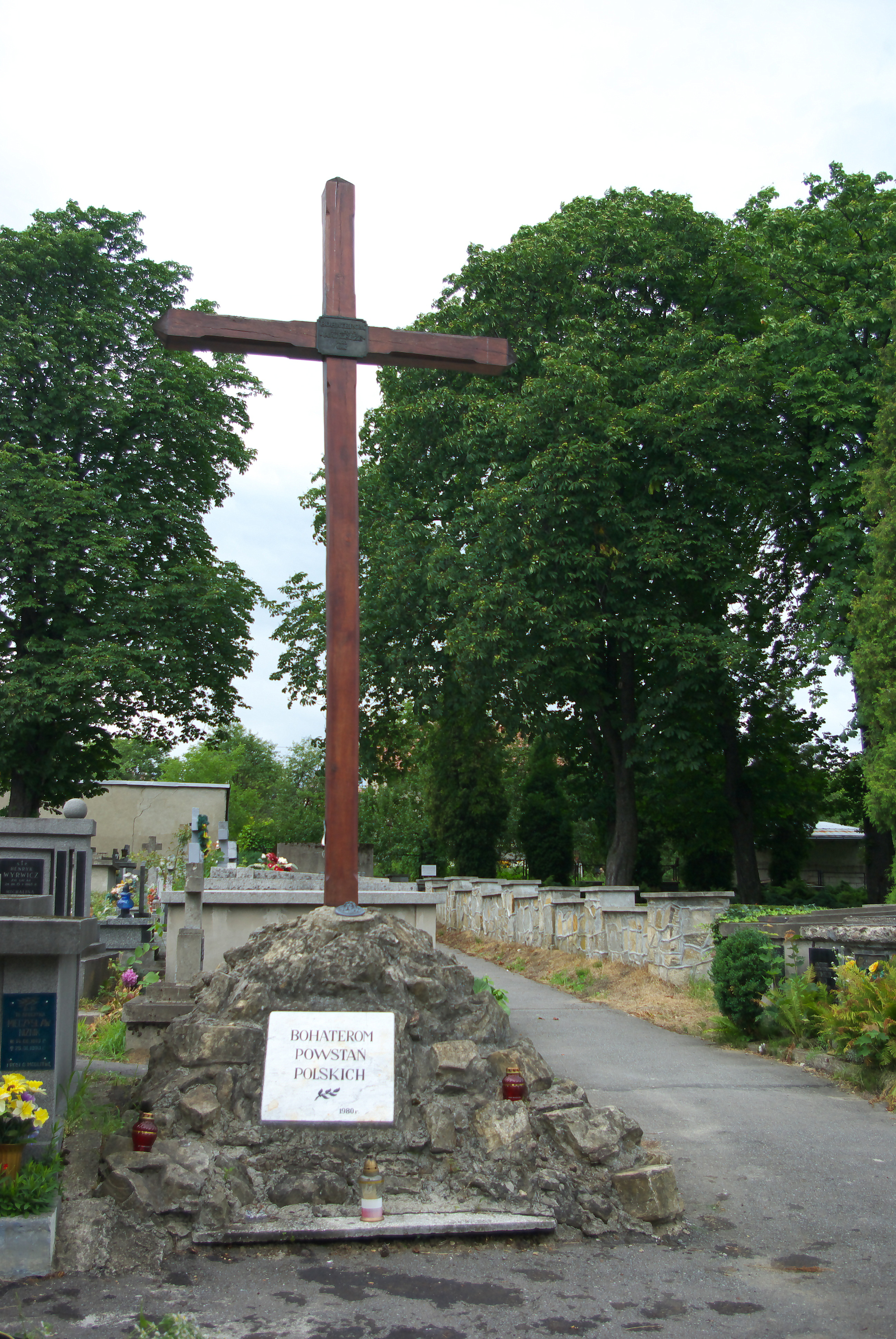
Insurgents Cross

Originally, a monument titled "Monument to Those Fallen in the National Struggles of 1830–31 and 1863" was planned shortly after the establishment of the cemetery on Rymanowska Street in 1896. The monument, designed by engineer Władysław Beksiński, was to consist of an oak cross placed on a mound of stone boulders, featuring a marble plaque for commemoration and surrounded by columns connected by a chain. It was intended to be located in one of four free plots reserved for distinguished individuals in the central part of the new cemetery.

The current oak Insurgents Cross is situated in the northwest corner of the old cemetery section on Rymanowska Street. Erected in 1923 by Sanok scouts and students of the Queen Sophia State Gymnasium, including Fritz Hotze, Józef Pohorski, Tadeusz Riedrich, and Zygmunt Żyłka-Żebracki, it commemorates Polish independence uprisings. A plaque on the cross reads: "To the Heroes of 1831/63, Scouts 1923", crafted at the Sanok Wagon Factory. Scouts, including Zdzisław Peszkowski, took their Scout Promise at the cross. In 1958, the symbolic monument was renovated by city authorities. In 1980, a new plaque was added to the stone base, inscribed: "To the Heroes of Polish Uprisings 1980". On 11 November 1996, a new cross was consecrated, incorporating the original 1923 metal plaque, updated to read: "To the Heroes of 1831/63, Scouts 1923 1996", funded by Sanok native and then Chief Scout of Poland, Ryszard Pacławski. Additionally, a plaque on the vertical beam reads: "Ernest Bauman, 1831 Insurgent, Knight of Virtuti Militari, Poznań Cavalry Regiment". The monument is recognized as a historic object and is legally protected.

==== Mass graves ====
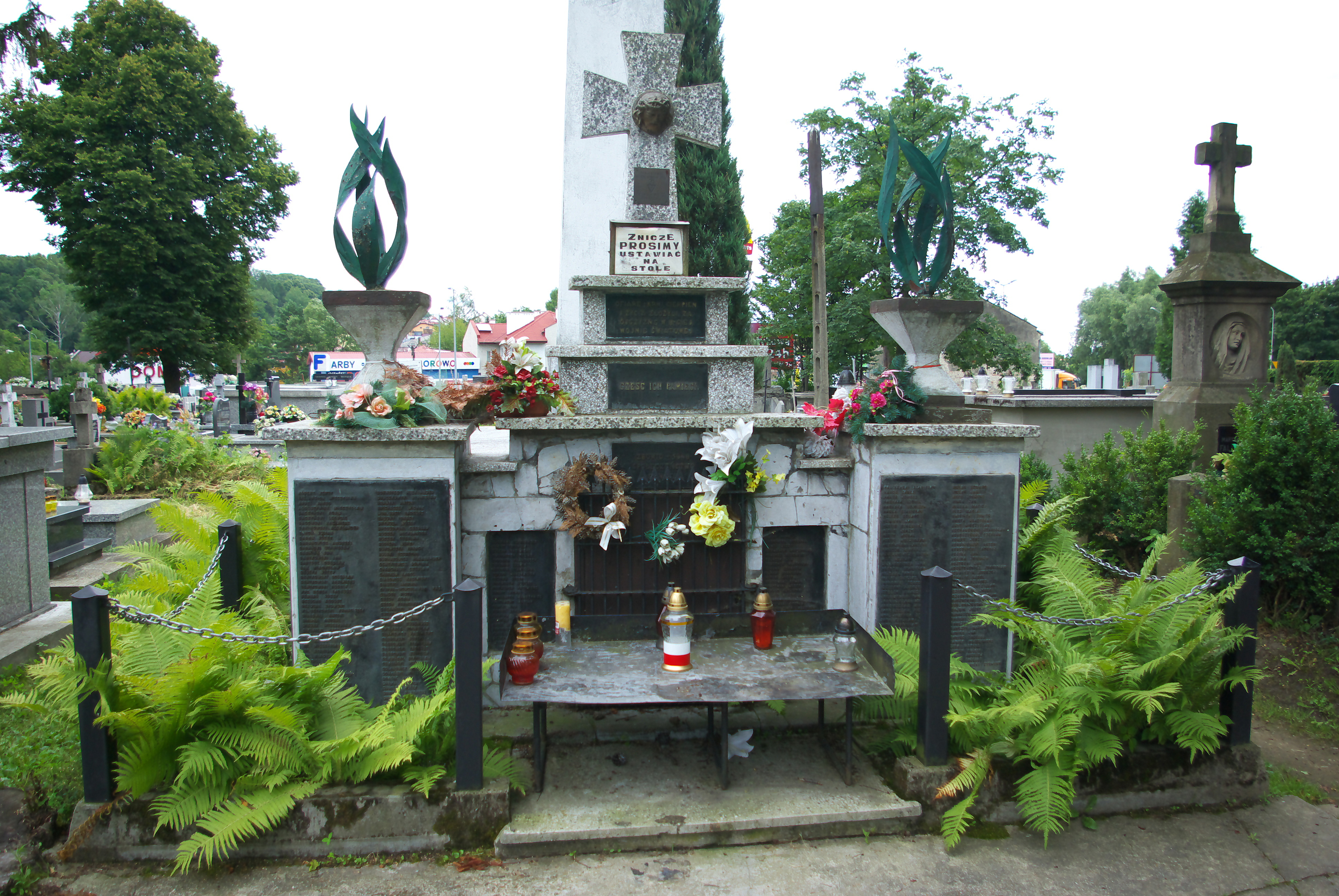
Mausoleum

Along the main avenue leading from Rymanowska Street to the original cemetery chapel are two mass graves. The first is the Mausoleum of World War II Victims, established in autumn 1948. This tomb contains the ashes of victims from Sanok and Sanok Land, including those who fought on World War II fronts, resistance members, prisoners of Nazi concentration camps, and others murdered. The monument was initiated by the Sanok branch of the Polish Association of Former Political Prisoners of Nazi Prisons and Concentration Camps, with planning beginning in 1946. Designed by Stanisław Ryniak, an architect and former Auschwitz concentration camp prisoner (the first Polish inmate, number 31), the mausoleum resembles a camp crematorium with a front opening and an obelisk resembling a chimney. The main plaque reads: They sacrificed blood, suffering, and life for the Homeland in World War II. Honor their memory". Inside, a bronze urn, crafted by association members employed at the Sanok Wagon Factory, holds soil from the Death Wall at Auschwitz concentration camp and other execution sites, including Gross-Rosen, Majdanek, Gruszka Mountain, Hanusiska Forest, Falejówka, Glinice Hill, Olchowce, and others, symbolically commemorating victims' remains.

Over the years, a registry of fallen and murdered individuals from Sanok Land was compiled, finalized in the 1950s, with plans to engrave their names on bronze plaques for the mausoleum's walls. After delays, 12 plaques listing victims' names were installed on the side walls. Initially, 560 identities were listed, later updated to 576. The Sanok County branch of the Society of Fighters for Freedom and Democracy completed the project, renovating the mausoleum before installing the Kraków-made plaques. The unveiling ceremony occurred in August 1962 during Sanok's 800th anniversary celebrations. Previously, tin plaques with victims' names were used.

The mausoleum is colloquially known as the "Mausoleum of Auschwitz Victims" or "Auschwitz Victims' Monument". The plaques list World War II victims, including those from German concentration camps, executed by Germans at Gruszka Mountain, Hanusiska Forest, Czarny Las, victims of the Katyn massacre, those who died in the Soviet Union, those murdered by the UPA, and those who fell at Monte Cassino. In 1978, the Sanok Bus Factory, responsible for the monument's maintenance, conducted renovation and conservation work, and students from Maria Skłodowska-Curie High School committed to cleaning the site.

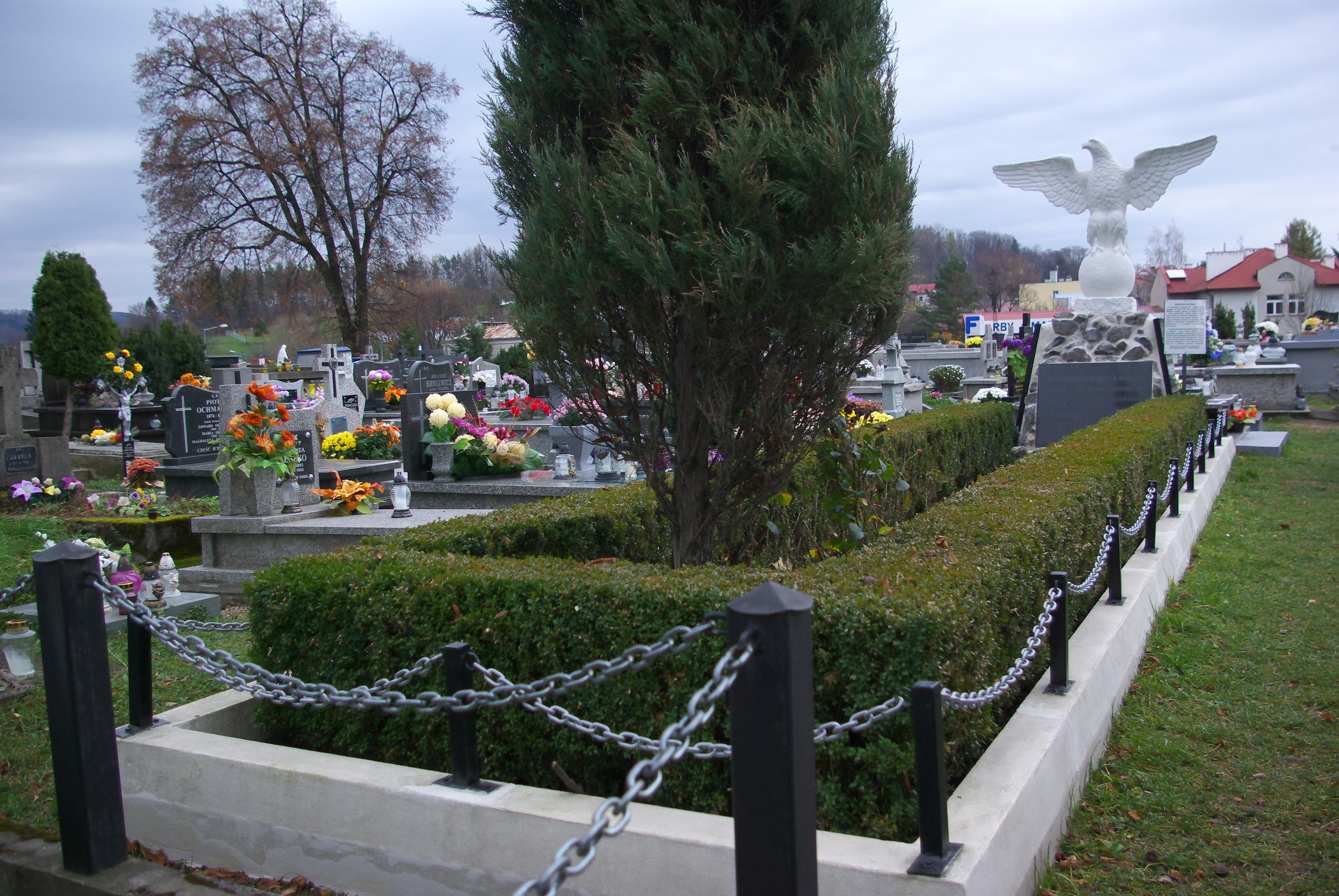
Mass grave of those executed at Gruszka Mountain

The second symbolic mass grave, located just behind the Mausoleum of World War II Victims, commemorates those executed at Gruszka Mountain. In November 1947, ceremonies in Sanok preceded the burial of exhumed remains of victims executed by Germans on 5–6 July 1940 on the slope of Gruszka Mountain near Tarnawa Dolna. These were 112 prisoners from Sanok Prison, including former Captain Czesław Wawrosz, Captain Jan Drabik, and Józef Rec, a professor at the Sanok gymnasium. The elongated grave is surrounded by a hedge. The monument, with a base of stacked stones, bears a plaque inscribed: "To the martyrs for freedom and democracy. Mass grave of Poles brutally murdered by Nazi thugs during the occupation of Sanok County from September 1939 to June 1944. Honor your memory". Atop the pedestal is a falcon sculpture by Stanisław Jan Piątkiewicz, originally intended in 1939 for the Sanok branch of the Sokół movement building. In 2012, the grave was renovated, and the falcon sculpture was repainted. In mid-2013, two plaques listing the names of those executed at Gruszka Mountain were added to the monument's sides.

==== Eastern Golgotha Cross and Memory Oaks ====
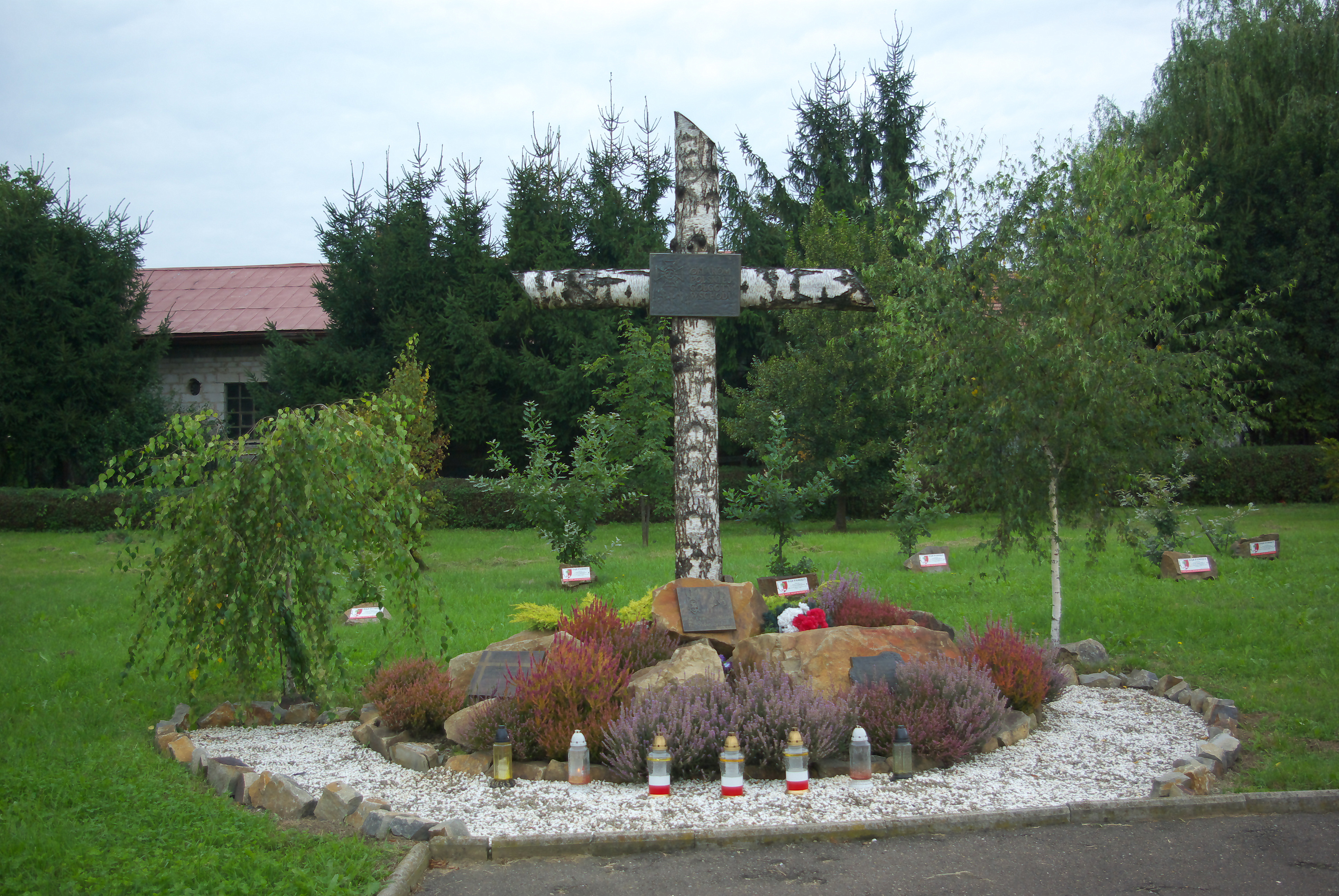
Eastern Golgotha Monument

The Eastern Golgotha Cross monument commemorates victims of the Katyn massacre from Sanok and Sanok Land. Located in the western part of the cemetery near the mortuary, it was initiated by Father Zdzisław Peszkowski. The central element is the Cross of Memory for the Victims of the Polish Eastern Golgotha, consecrated on 10 November 2008.

On 18 April 2009, as part of the "Katyn… We Remember"/"Katyn… Save from Oblivion" campaign, 21 Memory Oaks were planted around the cross in the so-called Katyn Alley, honoring Katyn massacre victims born in or connected to Sanok. On the second anniversary of Father Peszkowski's death, 8 October 2009, three additional Memory Oaks were planted. On the fifth anniversary, 8 October 2012, two more were added. In total, 26 officers and officials are commemorated. Research up to 2010 estimates over 60 individuals from Sanok and Sanok Land perished in the Katyn massacre. Scoutmaster Krystyna Chowaniec was a co-initiator of the Eastern Golgotha monument and the planting of Memory Oaks.

==== Historic tombstones ====
The cemetery features modernist funerary art. Numerous tombstones, both individual and family tombs, are recognized as historic and legally protected. In 1978, due to the absence of a local conservator, a city group including Edward Zając (director of the Sanok Historical Museum), Barbara Bandurka (city artist), and Krystyna Kilar (museum guide) inventoried 43 tombstones (5 in the Matejko Street section and 38 in the Rymanowska Street section), identifying them as historically valuable and proposing their preservation. On 20 December 1982, the voivodeship conservator of monuments registered 65 objects: 49 in the Rymanowska Street section (decision A-31) and 16 in the Matejko Street section (decision A-32), confirmed on 20 May 2009 by the Przemyśl Voivodeship Office for Monument Protection. In 2014, Sanok's municipal registry of monuments, published in 2015, listed 49 tombstones in the Rymanowska Street section and 16 in the Matejko Street section. This was reaffirmed in 2018.

Some historic tombstones have lost their original appearance. Registered tombstones include those crafted in Lviv workshops.

Since 2010, the Association for the Care of Old Cemeteries in Sanok, established on 16 January 2009 with Ewa Filip as president, has undertaken conservation and restoration of tombstones. The first restored was Mateusz Beksiński's tombstone in 2010. Subsequent restorations included Władysław Niedźwiecki and Maryan Truszkowski in 2011, the Heinrich family in 2012, Amalia Celestyna Świtalska in 2013, Feliks Giela in 2015, and Jan Porajewski in 2016.

List of tombstones registered as monuments:

===== Jan Matejko Street section =====
- Beksiński family tomb: Mateusz (1814–1886), Karolina (1830–1901).
- Tombstone of Grzegorz Hanulak (1807–29 July 1887).
- Tombstone of Balbina Germak (1880–1949).
- Germak family tomb: Jan (died 1926), Maria (1851–17 August 1930).
- Tombstone of Feliks Giela (1859–1936).
- Heinrich family tomb: Juliusz Heinrich (1836–1884), Kornel Heinrich (1833–1888), Józefa Drozd née Heinrich (1838–1889, wife of Józef Drozd, an official in Sanok, who died in 1896).
- Kawski family tomb: Marian (1876–1932), Czesława (1880–1976), Jadwiga Rudy (1910–1994).
- Konieczko family tomb: Wincenty (1852–1888), Teodozja (1861–1943), Seweryna Keller née Konieczko (1883–1951), Stanisława (1881–1971), Maria Keller (1909–2003), Apolonia Ostoja Świerczyńska (1829–1917).
- Löwy family tomb: Anna (1847–1912), Józef (1841–1917), Franciszek (1890–1968), Halina (died 1979).
- Tombstone of Władysław Niedźwiecki (1848–1857), son of Aleksander Niedźwiecki, the owner of Górki.
- Pollak family tomb: Karol (1818–1880).
- Suszko family tomb: Michał Nuncjusz (1916–1939), Cyprian (1922–1945), Stanisława (1887–1954), Michał (1860–1960).
- Tombstone of Amalia Celestyna Świtalska (1840–1882).
- Tombstone of Maryan Truszkowski (1879–1890).
- Two unidentified 19th-century tombstones: one a cross and one a vault by Stanisław Piątkiewicz.

===== Rymanowska Street section =====
- Baran family tomb: Franciszek (died 1915), Anna (died 1918).
- Baranowicz family tomb: Maria Anna (1888–1911), Jakub (1911–1912).
- Borczyk tombstone: Józef (born and died 1904), Stanisław (1904–1907).
- Tombstone of Wasylij Czemarnyk (1833–1896).
- Tombstone of Maria Dobosz (27 May 1909–28 January 1911), daughter of Emil and Zofia Dobosz.
- Dembicki family tomb: Adam Dembicki von Wrocień (1849–1933), Oktawia (1890–1984), Adam (1927–2017), Klaudiusz (1959–2017), Jadwiga Pisarczuk (1890–1957).
- Tombstone of Father Józef Drozd (1857–1923).
- Tombstone of Katarzyna Drwięga (1878–1950).
- Tombstone of Kazimiera Prus-Głowacka, née Bernatowicz (1845–1906), widow of Mieczysław Głowacki, a private official, and the mother of Helena (1870–1957), who was married to Adam Pytel.
- Tombstone of Maria Górczyńska (1907–11 September 1920), daughter of Kazimierz and Stefania.
- Guzik family tomb: Jan (1851–1918), Honorata (1845–1931).
- Hoffman family tomb: Petronela Hoffman née Zaleska (wife of Piotr, died on 6 August 1906 at the age of 30 as a result of an explosion), Leon Zaleski (died 1909).
- Tombstone of Maria Iwanowicz (1867–1930).
- Tombstone of Marian Bonawentura Jayko (1900–1918).
- Tombstone of Józefa Józefowicz (7 July 1887–9 May 1906), daughter of Jan and Marcianna née Bieleń, unmarried, died in Posada Sanocka of pleurisy.
- Keller family tombstone: Tadeusz (1913–1914), Zofia (1920–1924). Tadeusz and Zofia Keller were the children of Jan Keller (1876–1945) and Seweryna Henryka Keller (1883–1951, daughter of Wincenty Konieczko and Teodozja née Chinalska).
- Tombstone of Maria Kern née Truskolaska (1818–26 April 1900), widow of Adolf (a landowner in Radoszyce, who died on 26 April 1895 in Sanok at the age of 89), with whom she had been married for 48 years. She died in Posada Sanocka.
- Konratowicz family tomb: Alfred (1865–1897), Leontyna (1844–1913).
- Tombstone of Olga Krawczyńska née Nawratil (1855–22 January 1898), died in Sanok due to sarcoma. She was the wife of Kazimierz and the mother of Wiesław.
- Tombstone of Władysław Laurosiewicz (1864–10 March 1913), married to Aleksandra née Domańska, worked as a senior court official in Sanok, died of tuberculosis.
- Tombstone of Tytus Lemer.
- Tombstone of Maria Truskolaska Leszczyńska (1830–1899).
- Tombstone of Stanisław Leszczyński (died on 17 February 1906), son of Emil and Maria, head of the district labor office in Sanok and also assistant to the secretary of the District Council and Department in Sanok, Franciszek Bem. He was married to Helena née Janowska. He died from carbon monoxide poisoning in Płonna, where he was staying in connection with the funeral of Włodzimierz Truskolaski.
- Tombstone of Feliks Wilhelm Limbach. Born in Stryj, he was unmarried and died on 19 January 1908 in Posada Sanocka.
- Lipiński family tomb: Aleksander (1849–1897), Walenty (1813–1897), Kazimierz (1857–1911), Alfred Pohor Janowski (1883–1956), Anna Janowska (1889–1964), Walentyna Filipczak (1886–1955), Bronisław Filipczak (1877–1973). The tomb was restored at the city's expense in 1958.
- Tombstone of Cyryl Jaksa Ładyżyński (1830–1897) and Doctor Michał Ładyżyński (1867–1931).
- Tombstone of Leon Noras (1834–1902).
- Tombstone of Florian Nowak (1832–28 August 1899), retired tax adjoint, married to Malwina née Pszorn. His son was Dr. Zygmunt Nowak, a physician.
- Petschacher family tomb: Karol (died 1902), Amalia (died 1924); Marianna Nowak (died 1927).
- Pleszowski family tomb: Jasieńko-Zefircio (born and died in 1885), Jan Pleszowski (died 1909).
- Tombstone of Jan Porajewski (1872–1929).
- Tombstone of Zbigniew Praczyński (25 August 1920–18 January 1921), son of Jan and Stanisława.
- Tombstone of Anna Radomska née Terlecka (1825–7 April 1907), wife of Antoni.
- Tombstone of Józef Salamon (1848–1929).
- Samecki and Słuszkiewicz family tomb: Jan Samecki (died 1926), Maria Samecka (1936), Stefania Słuszkiewicz (1889–1959), Maria Słuszkiewicz (1949–1950).
- Tombstone of Zbigniew Schwarz (died 1922). In the heritage register description, mistakenly listed as "the tombstone of Zbyszko Szywarz".
- Tombstone of Zofia Siekierzyńska (1897–1900), daughter of Karol Sr. (1858–1907) and the sister of, among others, Karol Jr. (1907–1979).
- Słuszkiewicz family tomb: Michał (1848–1936), Paulina (1858–1926).
- Tombstone of Father Bronisław Stasicki (1836–1908).
- Sulimierski family tomb: Kazimierz (1857–1914), Maria (1883–1921).
- Tombstone of August Ścibor-Rylski (died 1902).
- Tombstone of Olga Ścibor-Rylska (1873–19 July 1898), daughter of Ludmiła and August Ścibor-Rylski, died from malignant melanoma.
- Tombstone of Bronisława Ślączka (1856–1903).
- Tombstone of Wojciech Ślączka (1851–1925).
- Tombstone of Ludwik Święch (died 1911 at the age of 38).
- Tombstone of Magdalena Truskolaska (died on 19 July 1898 at the age of 67).
- Insurgents Cross.
- Two unidentified tombstones from the turn of the 19th and 20th centuries: one depicting a sculpture of an angel, the other the grave of Jadwiga Kielanowska (died 1896).

Additionally, the old cemetery chapel on Rymanowska Street was entered into the municipal register of monuments of the city of Sanok in 2014. Originally, since 1895, it served as the family burial chapel of the Habermann family, in which the following family members were buried: Józefa Habermann (died 1895), Antoni Habermann de Haberfeld (died 1916), Leopold Habermann (died 1917), Franciszka Habermann de Haberfeld Owsiany (died 1920), and Robert Habermann (died 1943).

The original tombstone of Józio and Staś Borczyk no longer exists. Both deceased are mentioned in the inscription on Władysław Szombara's tomb, which is located in the previous location of the historic tombstone.

== Burials in the cemetery ==
=== Knights of the Virtuti Militari Order ===
People awarded the Virtuti Militari Order who were buried at the Central Cemetery in Sanok:

- Doctor Kacper Kostecki (1785–1864), physician in the 14th Infantry Regiment of the Army of the Duchy of Warsaw, participant in the 1812 campaign, district physician in the Sanok district (Gold Cross).
- Ernest Bauman (died 1889), non-commissioned officer of the Poznań Cavalry Regiment, November Uprising insurgent, engineer (Silver Cross).
- Captain Kazimierz Swoszowski (1893–1920), pilot, participant in World War I and the Polish–Soviet War (Silver Cross).
- Second Lieutenant Adam Antoni Bratro (1900–1920), scout, company commander, participated and died in the Polish–Soviet War (Silver Cross).
- Lieutenant Colonel Karol Lenczowski (1891–1936), legionary, officer of the Polish Army, commander of the 2nd Podhale Rifle Regiment from 1935 to 1936 (Silver Cross).
- Major Kazimierz Biernat (1894–1937), soldier of the 82nd Siberian Infantry Regiment, participant in the Polish–Soviet War (Silver Cross).
- Private Rifleman Jan Goryl (1924–1946), soldier of the 8th Dresden Infantry Division and the 34th Budziszyn Infantry Regiment (Silver Cross).
- Major Kazimierz Poschinger (1898–1956), participant in four wars: World War I and II, the Polish–Ukrainian War, and the Polish–Soviet War (Silver Cross).
- Corporal Jan Drwięga (1894–1970), legionary, participant in the Polish–Ukrainian War, employee in the oil industry (Silver Cross).
- Lieutenant Piotr Dudycz (1902–1973), non-commissioned officer of the Polish Army of the Second Republic of Poland, soldier of the Home Army, officer of the Border Protection Corps (Silver Cross).
- Senior Sergeant Kazimierz Nowakowski (1898–1977), participant in four wars: World War I and II, the Polish–Ukrainian War, and the Polish–Soviet War, persecuted by the communist authorities after 1945 (Silver Cross).
- Captain Aleksander Rybicki (1904–1983), officer of the Home Army, organizer of courier routes during World War II, museum curator, founder of the Open-Air Museum in Sanok (Silver Cross).
- Captain Stanisław Szwed (1894–1984), officer, local government activist, member of the Sejm of the Second Republic of Poland, lawyer (Silver Cross).
- Jan Łożański (1912–1990), officer of the Home Army, multiple cross-border courier on the Warsaw–Budapest route, persecuted and imprisoned by the communist authorities after the war (Silver Cross 2x).
- Lieutenant Colonel Paweł Miller (1921–1992), officer of the Polish People's Army, activist of the Association of Polish Soldiers (Silver Cross).
- Lieutenant Colonel Edward Łabno (1908–1995), officer of the Polish Army and Polish Armed Forces in the West, participant in World War II in the September Campaign and on the Western Front, persecuted by the communist authorities after the war, councilor of Sanok (Silver Cross).
- Colonel Zygmunt Żyłka-Żebracki (1907–1997), officer, during World War II acted in the Polish Army, Home Army, Freedom and Independence, commander of the 15th Infantry Regiment "Wilków", participant in Operation Storm, persecuted and imprisoned by the communist authorities after the war, civil engineer (Gold Cross).
- Captain Wojciech Dąbrowski (1900–1998), officer of the Border Guard of the Second Republic of Poland, participant in four wars: World War I and II, the Polish–Ukrainian War, and the Polish–Soviet War, officer of the Polish Army (Silver Cross).
- Lieutenant Colonel Marian Jarosz (1921–2008), officer of the Polish Army, participant in World War II, fights with the Ukrainian Insurgent Army (Silver Cross).
- Colonel Wiesław Wolwowicz (1922–2014), officer of the Polish Armed Forces in the West, participant in the Western Front battles during World War II.
- Brigadier General Pilot Ludwik Krempa (1916–2017), reserve non-commissioned officer of the Polish Air Force of the Second Republic of Poland, colonel pilot of the Polish Air Forces, second lieutenant of the Royal Air Force, appointed to the rank of brigadier general in 2016 (Silver Cross).
- Major Danuta Przystasz (1920–2019), participant in the underground resistance during World War II and the Warsaw Uprising, imprisoned by the communist regime of the Polish People's Republic (Silver Cross).

In 1932, another Knight of the Virtuti Militari Order, Janusz Dłużniakiewicz, was buried in the cemetery, but his remains were later transferred to the Powązki Military Cemetery in Warsaw.

=== Other military personnel and officers ===
- Participants of the November Uprising of 1830/1831:
  - Ernest Bauman (1810–1889),
  - Tytus Peszyński (died 1881),
  - Walenty Lipiński (1813–1897),
  - Mateusz Beksiński (1814–1886).
- Participants of the January Uprising of 1863:
  - Karol Knabe (died 1873), Walerian Weiss (died 1895),
  - Marceli Tomżyński (died 1902),
  - August Ścibor-Rylski (died 1902),
  - Michał Zbiegień (born around 1839, a shoemaker by trade, married to Wiktoria née Kopystyńska, father of Romuald and Eleonora, died on 15 July 1908 in Sanok. According to a press report, his grave was located at the edge of the cemetery, near the residence of the local gravedigger, Bronisław Sokołowski),
  - Maksymilian Kamiński (born in 1845 in Bochnia as the son of Roman, worked as an official of the Advance Society in Sanok, died on 14 October 1908 in Posada Sanocka),
  - Józef Wieniawa Kossowicz (died 1911).
- Military personnel of the Austro-Hungarian Army and the Imperial-Royal Landwehr:
  - 2nd Lieutenant Wilhelm Kwiatkowski (died 1876),
  - Captain Wojciech Krystyński (1816–1885, officer of the 12th Infantry Regiment),
  - Senior Lieutenant Alfred Konratowicz (born in 1865, grandson of Jerzy Rapf, son of tax official Jan Konratowicz and Leontyna née Rapf, brother of Karolina, wife of Włodzimierz Bańkowski, imperial-royal first lieutenant of the 16th Infantry Regiment from Bjelovar, died in Trnava and was buried in Sanok on 9 May 1897),
  - Soldiers of the 45th Infantry Regiment of Austria-Hungary:
    - 2nd Lieutenant Oscar Holfeld (1877–1899, tombstone removed),
    - Sergeant Jan Wilusz (regimental accounting sergeant),
    - Jan Tytus Pokorny (1876–1932, reserve officer, head of the Sanok station).
- Soldiers fallen in the Battle of Khyriv:
  - Corporal Wacław Ślaski, 2nd Lieutenant Stanisław Sas Korczyński, Private Mieczysław Chmura (all three died on 19 January 1919, the latter two in the Polish armored train Kozak),
  - Section Chief Wilhelm Czownicki (24 January 1919).
- Soldiers of the Polish Armed Forces:
  - Zbigniew Jastrzębiec Strzelecki (1904–1920, scout, volunteer of the 2nd Infantry Regiment),
  - 2nd Lieutenant Ignacy Borowski (1898–1995, participant in the Polish–Soviet War, awarded the Virtuti Militari).
- Officers of the imperial-royal police and the State Police:
  - Inspector Jan Mozołowski (1856–1898),
  - Senior Policeman Wojciech Zawieja (1884–1922) and Senior Policeman Marcin Lechowicz (1876–1922) – both killed during a chase after bandits in a train,
  - Policeman Marian Bruss (1897–1933).
- Participants of World War II:
  - Lieutenant Colonel Stanisław Józef Sławiński (1905–1982),
  - Captain Dr. Gustaw Kosiba (1902–1981),
  - Jan Grzebień, codenamed Krępacz (died 1995).
  - Participants of the Warsaw Uprising of 1944:
    - Captain Edward Solon (1899–1971),
    - Jan Sawczak-Knihinicki (1896–1973),
    - Mikołaj Kasprowicz (1917–1985),
    - Mieczysław Przystasz (1914–1986),
    - Adam Kulczycki (1921–2001),
    - 2nd Lieutenant Wanda Komska (1922–1992),
    - 2nd Lieutenant Stefan Grzyb (1913–1999),
    - Zdzisława Trznadel (1922–2010),
    - Romuald Bobrzak (1928–2012),
    - Major Danuta Przystasz (1920–2019).

==== Symbolic graves ====
- Killed in the Polish–Soviet War:
  - 2nd Lieutenant/Captain Tadeusz Prochownik (died 6 June 1920 in Popilnia).
- Victims of World War II:
  - Victims of German repression, concentration camps, and extermination during World War II:
    - Victims of Auschwitz concentration camp:
      - Kazimierz Dulęba (1921–1942, Home Army soldier, prisoner of the first mass transport to Auschwitz),
      - Wojciech Sieńko (1886–1942),
      - Michał Ekert.
    - Maria Kosina (1896–1944, killed in the Warsaw Uprising).
  - World War II participants buried abroad:
    - Major Stanisław Szczupak (1910–1969),
    - Captain Engineer Edward Świderski (1911–1973, Air Force officer of the Polish Armed Forces in the West),
    - 2nd Lieutenant Ignacy Szczupak (1917–1990, buried in Gunnersbury).

=== Other individuals ===
==== Clergy and monks ====
- Parsons of the Parish of the Transfiguration:
  - Franciszek Salezy Czaszyński (1812–1898),
  - Bronisław Stasicki (1836–1908),
  - Franciszek Salezy Matwijkiewicz (1909–1933),
  - Adam Sudoł (1920–2012).
- Franciscan monks:
  - Brother Medart Teneta (1886–1955),
  - Father Błażej Wierdak (1914–2000, guardian).
- Father Canon Andrzej Moskal (1907–1959, chaplain of the Home Army).
- Common burial plot of the Daughters of Charity of Saint Vincent de Paul.

==== Officials and local government representatives ====
- Jan Rajchel (1881–1937), mayor of Sanok.
- Antoni Lenik (born ca. 1812, died 1866, imperial-royal financial advisor – tombstone no longer exists).
- Legal officials:
  - Eugeniusz Szatyński,
  - Franciszek Filipczak (1891–1962, deputy president of the county court in Sanok),
  - Dr. Andrzej Madeja (1884–1966, lawyer).
- Local government officials:
  - Karol Dręgiewicz (died 1882, member of the city council in Sanok from 1850 to 1865),
  - Jerzy Drozd (died 1896, secretary of the imperial-royal starosta in Sanok, head and accountant of the imperial-royal tax office in Sanok, councilor and assessor of the city of Sanok).

==== Teachers and education workers ====
- Józef Grotowski (1874–1905, high school professor),
- Władysław Łukaszewicz (1858–1934, director of a 7-grade school).

==== Artists and media personalities ====
- Stanisław de Mirow Myszkowski (1849–1929, writer),
- Czesława Dorec-Czarniecka née Starawska (1907–1994, theater actress).

==== Scientists, engineers, and entrepreneurs ====
- Piotr Radwański (1873–1955, city gardener of the Sanok park),
- Dr. Eng. Jacek Szczepkowski (1940–2019),
- Ludwik Dankmayer (1902–1961, mine director in Harklowa).

==== Others ====
- Wilhelmina Tertil née Płońska (died 12 February 1866, aged 27), wife of Robert Tertil and mother of Tadeusz Tertil.
- Julia Starosolska (1845–1919), daughter of Jerzy Rapf, wife of Joachim, mother of Wołodymyr.

== In culture ==
- According to the novel The Good Soldier Švejk by Czech writer Jaroslav Hašek, in 1915, the XI March Company of Švejk was stationed at the Imperial-Royal Gymnasium in Sanok, where several Hungarian soldiers poisoned themselves with formalin consumed from the school's biological specimens. The deceased were reportedly buried at the cemetery on Rymanowska Street. Among them was Laszlo Garganyi, a honvéd from the march battalion of the 91st Infantry Regiment, mentioned by the writer.
- Soviet soldier and writer Emil Kardin, in his book Odsłonięte skrzydło (The Uncovered Flank), described his multiple visits in 1972 to the Soviet soldiers' cemetery in Sanok.
- The Central Cemetery in Sanok was the subject of a 1991 publication by Stefan Stefański titled Cmentarze sanockie (Sanok Cemeteries) and a 2005 publication by Paweł Nestorowicz titled Boża rola. Przyczynek do historii cmentarzy sanockich w 110-tą rocznicę konsekracji cmentarza przy ul. Rymanowskiej (God's Acre: A Contribution to the History of Sanok Cemeteries on the 110th Anniversary of the Consecration of the Cemetery on Rymanowska Street). Objects existing at the Central Cemetery in Sanok were mentioned in a 2015 publication by Adam Szary titled Bieszczadzkie motywy roślinne między światem żywych a krainą zmarłych (Bieszczady Plant Motifs Between the World of the Living and the Realm of the Dead).
- Poet Janusz Szuber referenced the cemetery in his poem Tableau, published in the 2005 collection Mojość.

== Bibliography ==
- Stefański, Stefan (1991). Cmentarze sanockie [Sanok Cemeteries] (in Polish). Sanok: Polskie Towarzystwo Turystyczno-Krajoznawcze.
- Nestorowicz, Paweł (2005). Boża rola. Przyczynek do historii cmentarzy sanockich w 110-tą rocznicę konsekracji cmentarza przy ul. Rymanowskiej [God's Role: A Contribution to the History of Sanok's Cemeteries on the 110th Anniversary of the Consecration of the Cemetery on Rymanowska Street] (in Polish).
- Schubert, Jan (2012). Inspekcja grobów żołnierskich w Przemyślu. Powstanie i działalność w Galicji Środkowej 1915-1918 [Inspection of Soldiers' Graves in Przemyśl: Origins and Activity in Central Galicia, 1915–1918] (in Polish). Kraków: Andrzej Frycz Modrzewski Kraków University. ISBN 978-83-7571-237-7.
- Andrunik, Arnold (1986). Rozwój i działalność Związku Bojowników o Wolność i Demokrację na Ziemi Sanockiej w latach 1949–1984 [Development and Activity of the Union of Fighters for Freedom and Democracy in the Sanok Land, 1949–1984] (in Polish). Sanok: ZBOWiD.
- Inwentarz Archiwum Historycznego Muzeum Historycznego w Sanoku. Nr teczki 341: Opis nagrobków przeznaczonych do odnowienia i przedstawiających wartość historyczną na cmentarzu przy ul. Rymanowskiej i Matejki w Sanoku [Inventory of the Historical Archive of the Historical Museum in Sanok. File No. 341: Description of Tombstones Designated for Restoration and of Historical Value at the Cemetery on Rymanowska and Matejko Streets in Sanok] (in Polish). Sanok: Muzeum Historyczne w Sanoku. 1982.
