= Insurgents Cross =

Monument in Sanok, Poland

- Krzyż Powstańców (Polish)
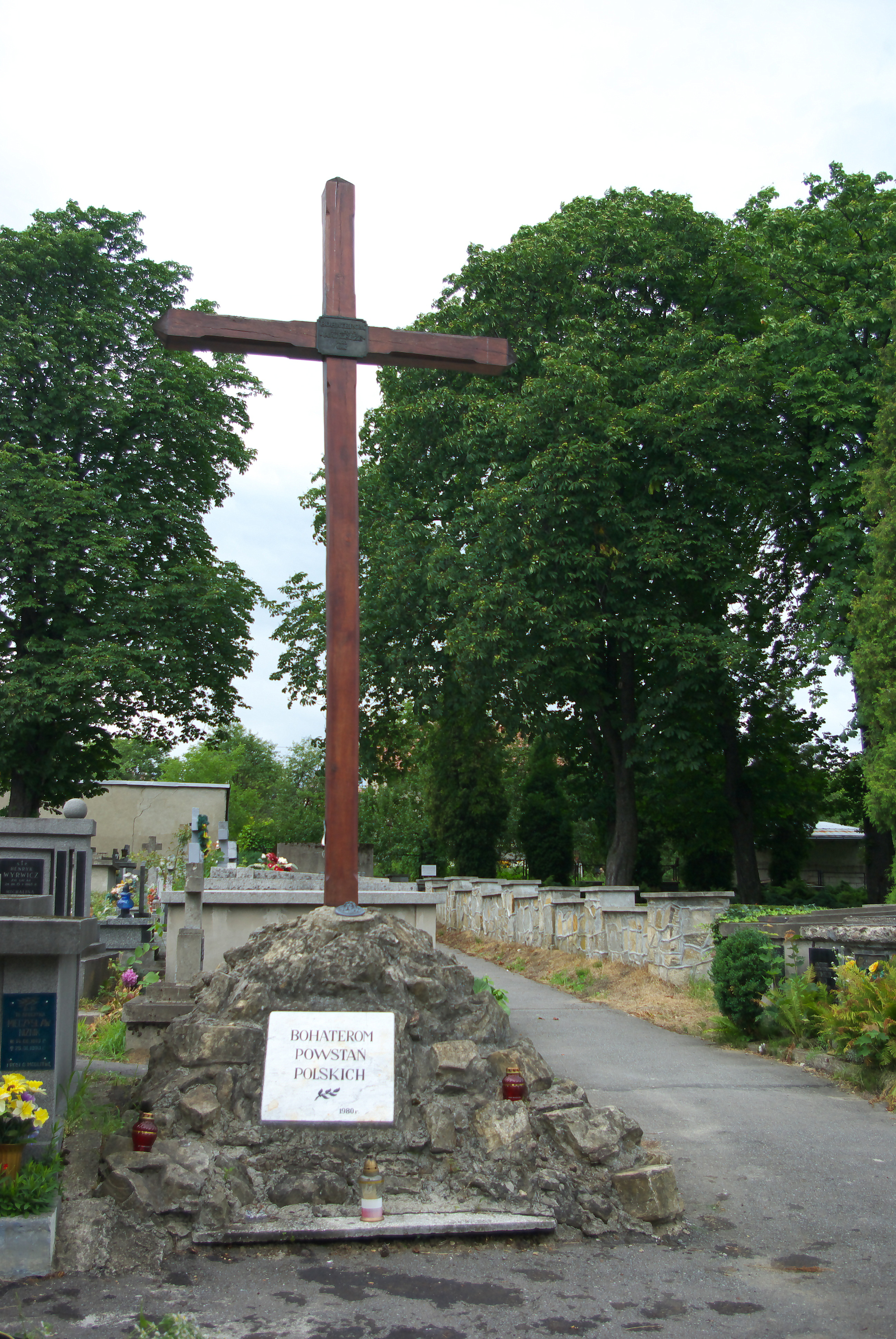
- Insurgents' Cross at the Central Cemetery in Sanok
- Location: Central Cemetery in Sanok
- Coordinates: 49°33′47.116″N 22°11′22.884″E
- Designer: Władysław Beksiński
- Type: Cross
- Completion date: 1923

Insurgents Cross (Polish: Krzyż Powstańców) is a monument in the form of a cross located at the Central Cemetery in Sanok, Poland.

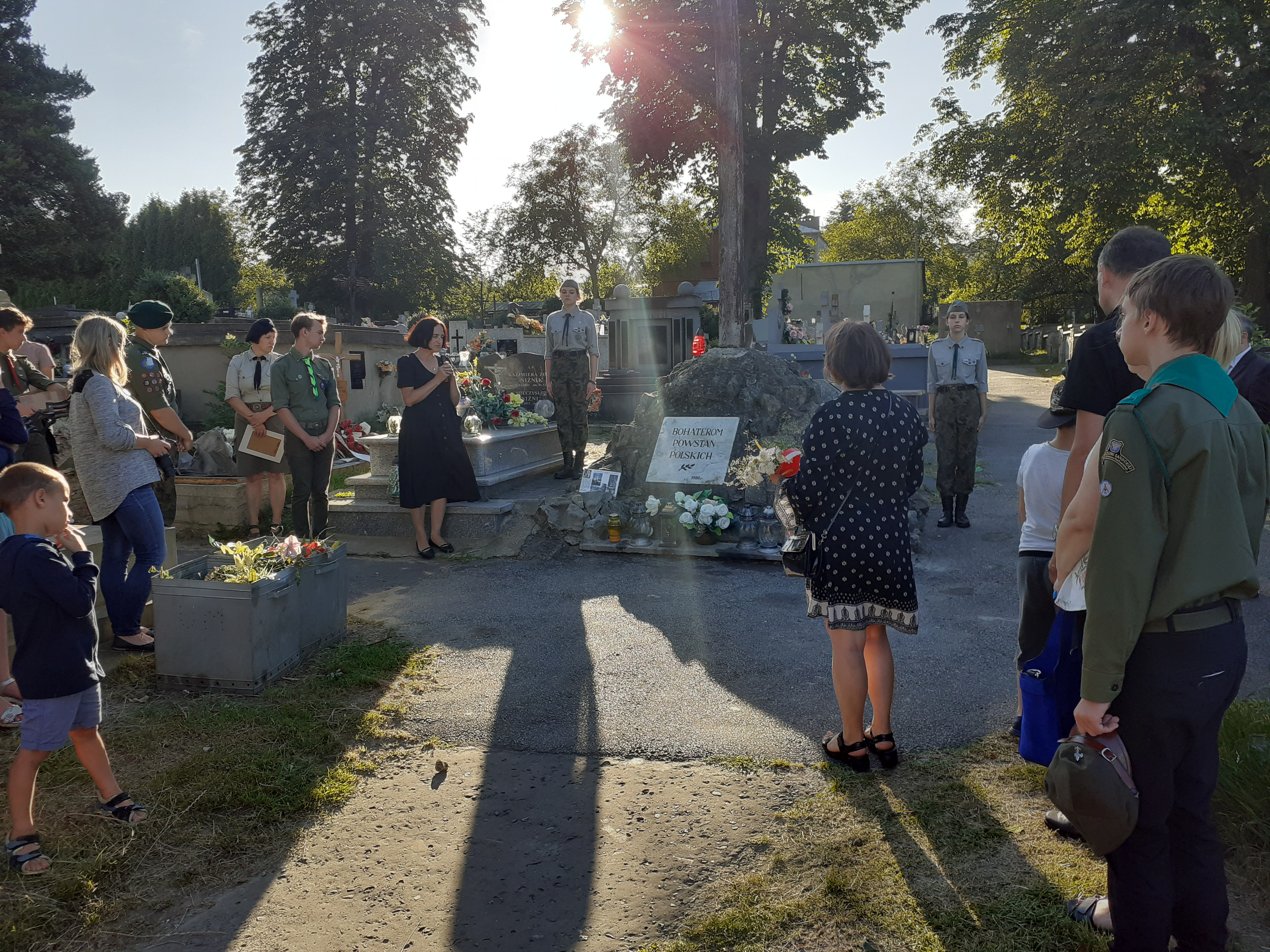
Ceremonies at the Cross on 1 August 2021

== History ==
=== Origin of the commemoration ===
The idea to erect a "Monument to those fallen in the national struggles of 1830–31 and 1863" emerged when the cemetery on Rymanowska Street was established in late 1895. During a City Council meeting on 24 October 1895, at the request of a committee for the erection of a monument or commemorative cross for those who fell in the struggles of 1830 and 1863, it was decided to allocate, free of charge, one of the spaces designated for distinguished individuals in the northwest corner, specifically No. 1. The four spaces for distinguished individuals at the cemetery were planned by the designer of the cemetery's technical documentation, Władysław Beksiński, near the centrally located Habermann Family Tomb Chapel. The monument was also designed by Eng. Władysław Beksiński. A civic committee, formed a few years earlier, worked towards erecting the monument and made final decisions during a meeting on 21 March 1896. The monument was planned as a wooden oak cross placed on a mound of stones, with a marble plaque bearing a commemorative inscription. It was to be surrounded by low stone columns connected by an iron chain. A committee of four women was tasked with permanently maintaining the monument.

The cross honoring the insurgents was described in the memoirs of Prof. Karol Zaleski, who recalled visiting the cemetery "seemingly with his parents". He resided permanently in Sanok until passing his final exams in 1909, and his mother died in 1912. According to Stefan Stefański, on the 50th anniversary of the January Uprising, there were plans in Sanok to establish a monument for the insurgents of 1830 and 1863, designed by Julian Markowski, who had previously designed the first Tadeusz Kościuszko monument unveiled in St. John's Square in 1902. However, this plan did not come to fruition, though a cross was reportedly erected in 1913. Neither the program nor the reports of the 50th anniversary celebrations of the January Uprising in Sanok mentioned the establishment of a commemorative monument. Citing these celebrations, Edward Zając mentioned a commemorative cross at the cemetery but did not specify when it was erected.

=== Realization in 1923 ===
According to Józef Pohorski (known in his youth as Pudełko), in the early 20th century, scouts in Sanok maintained a tradition of lighting a bonfire at the cemetery on All Saints' Day, 1 November, using juniper bushes collected from the nearby Glinice Hill. During this ceremony, they sang songs such as Boże, coś Polskę and Z dymem pożarów. At that time, no Mass was held at the cemetery, only a procession. Four scouts from the Sanok Scout Troop, led in the early 1920s by Father Paweł Rabczak, who were also students at the local Queen Zofia State Gymnasium, decided to erect a commemorative cross to honor Polish independence uprisings. These were Fritz Hotze, Józef Pohorski, Tadeusz Riedrich, and Zygmunt Żyłka-Żebracki. They obtained permission from landowner Eugeniusz Nowak to cut down an oak tree in a forest near the village of Liszna near Sanok in mid-October 1923. The tree was transported to the city using a self-propelled cart (without a horse). Upon arrival at the gymnasium, the oak was placed in the scout common room on the ground floor in the northern part of the school building. Work on crafting the cross took several days. This was made possible by a carpentry workshop within the scout troop, where master carpenters from the Sanok Machine and Wagon Factory taught carpentry to scouts on Saturdays. At this factory, a plaque was made with the inscription: "To the Heroes of 1831/63, Scouts 1923", which was attached to the cross. Before 1 November 1923, the scouts transported the completed cross to the cemetery, where it was erected and surrounded by a stone base. On All Saints' Day that year, the annual church procession stopped at the cross, where prayers were offered and songs were sung.

Sanok scouts, including Father Scoutmaster Zdzisław Peszkowski, took their Scout Promise at the cross, with Peszkowski doing so on 1 November 1928. In 1958, the monument was renovated by the city authorities. Throughout the 20th century, the wooden cross was replaced multiple times due to the deterioration of successive versions. In 1980, the Committee for the Celebration of the 100th Anniversary of the Sanok Gymnasium, which organized a "Friendly Reunion of Professors and Alumni for the 100th Anniversary of the Gymnasium and the First General Lyceum in Sanok", funded the renovation of the 1863 insurgents' monument. In 1980, a new oak cross was erected, retaining the original plaque at the intersection of the beams, while a marble plaque with the inscription "To the Heroes of the Polish Uprisings 1980" was placed on the stone mound. During the National Independence Day celebrations in Sanok on 11 November 1996, the renovated cross was blessed along with a new plaque inscribed "To the Heroes of 1831/63, Scouts 1923 1996", funded by Ryszard Pacławski, then Chief of the Polish Scouting and Guiding Association, who hailed from Sanok. Additionally, a plaque was attached to the back of the vertical beam of the cross with the inscription "Ernest Bauman, Insurgent of 1831, Knight of V.M., Lieutenant Colonel of the Poznań Cavalry".

On 22 January 2013, the 150th anniversary of the January Uprising was commemorated at the Insurgents Cross. Every year on 1 August, ceremonies are held to commemorate participants of the Warsaw Uprising connected to Sanok, including those buried at the cemetery.
