= Janusz Szuber =

Polish poet, essayist, and columnist (1947–2020)

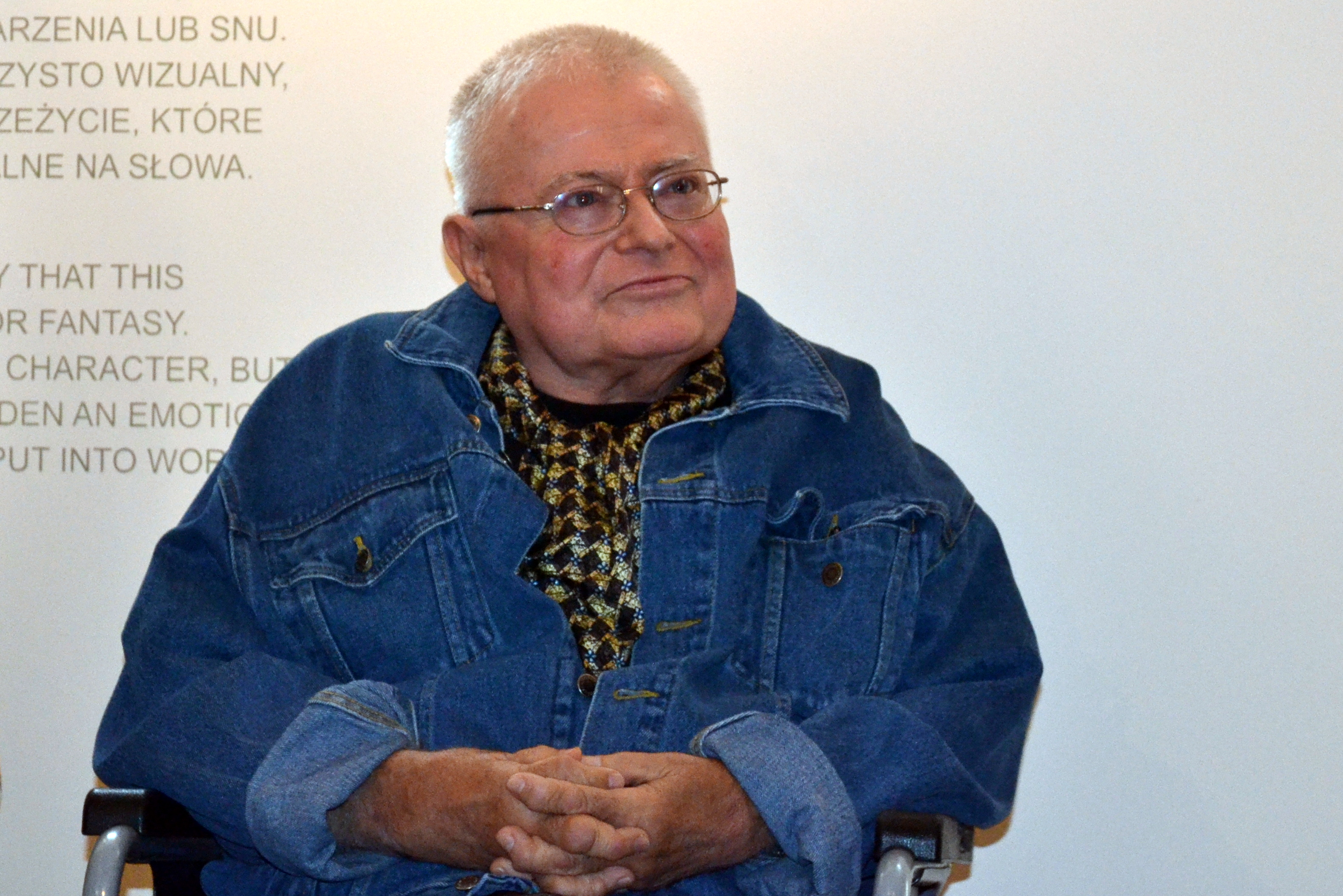
- Janusz Szuber, 2015
- Born: 10 December 1947; Sanok
- Died: 1 November 2020 (aged 72); Lesko
- Citizenship: Polish
- Occupations: Poet, essayist, columnist

Janusz Maria Szuber (10 December 1947 – 1 November 2020) was a poet, essayist and columnist.

== Books ==
- Paradne ubranko i inne wiersze. Sanok. 1995.
- Apokryfy i epitafia sanockie. Sanok. 1995.
- Pan Dymiącego Zwierciadła. Sanok. 1996. ISBN 83-905046-1-8.
- Gorzkie prowincje. Sanok. 1996. ISBN 83-905046-0-X.
- Srebrnopióre ogrody. Sanok. 1996. ISBN 83-905046-2-6.
- Śniąc siebie w obcym domu. Sanok: Muzeum Historyczne w Sanoku. 1997.
- Biedronka na śniegu. Kraków: Wydawnictwo a5. 1999. ISBN 83-85568-41-7.
- O chłopcu mieszającym powidła. Sto wierszy z lat 1968–1997. Kraków: Wydawnictwo „Znak”. 1999. ISBN 83-7006-969-X.
- 7 Gedichte / 7 Wierszy – wybór wierszy. Sanok: Miejska Biblioteka Publiczna w Sanoku. 1999.
- Okrągłe oko pogody. Kraków: Wydawnictwo Literackie. 2000. ISBN 83-08-03058-0.
- Z żółtego metalu. Kraków: Księgarnia Akademicka. 2000. ISBN 83-7188-341-2.
- 19 wierszy – wybór wierszy. Lesko. 2000.
- Las w lustrach / Forest in the Mirrors. Rzeszów: Wydawnictwo YES. 2001. ISBN 83-911519-2-1. Paintings by Henryk Waniek; translated to English by: Ewa Hryniewicz-Yarbrough, Clare Cavanagh.
- Wiersze z "kociej szafy". Sanok. 2002.
- Lekcja Tejrezjasza i inne wiersze wybrany. Kraków: Wydawnictwo Literackie. 2003.
- Glina, ogień, popiół. Sanok: Miejska Biblioteka Publiczna im. Grzegorza z Sanoka w Sanoku. 2003.
- Tam, gdzie niedźwiedzie piwo warzą. Olszanica: Wydawnictwo BoSz. 2004.
- Mojość. Sanok: Oficyna Wydawnicza Miejskiej Biblioteki Publicznej im. Grzegorza z Sanoka w Sanoku. 2005. ISBN 83-919470-8-4. Photographs by Władysław Szulc.
- Czerteż. Kraków: Wydawnictwo Literackie. 2006. ISBN 83-08-03913-8.
- Spijmanij u sit′. Kyiv. 2007.
- Pianie kogutów. Kraków: Wydawnictwo „Znak”. 2008. ISBN 978-83-240-0941-1.
- Wpis do ksiąg wieczystych. Kraków: Wydawnictwo Literackie. 2009. ISBN 978-83-08-04294-6.
- They Carry a Promise. Selected poems. New York: Alfred A. Knopf. 2009. Translated to English by Ewa Hryniewicz-Yarbrough.
- O deczaku koji je meszao pekmez. Belgrad. 2009. Translated by Biserka Rajčić.
- Wyżej, niżej, już / Plus haut, plus bas, ça y est. Rzeszów: Podkarpacki Instytut Książki i Marketingu. 2010. ISBN 978-83-61746-38-6. Translated to French by Marcin Nowoszewski.
- Powiedzieć. Cokolwiek. Kraków: Wydawnictwo Literackie. 2011. ISBN 978-83-08-04582-4.
- Emeryk u wód. Rzeszów: Stowarzyszenie Literacko-Artystyczne „Fraza”. 2012. ISBN 978-83-60678-37-4.
- Tym razem wyraźnie. Kraków: Wydawnictwo Literackie. 2014. ISBN 978-83-08-05356-0.
- Rynek 14/1. Kraków: Wydawnictwo Literackie. 2016. ISBN 978-83-0806197-8.
- Próba dębu / Teste do carvalho. Rzeszów: Polski Fundusz Wydawniczy w Kanadzie. 2019. ISBN 978-1-927490-20-4. Translated to Portuguese by Zygmunt Wojski.
- Przyjęcie postawy. Wybór wierszy z lat 2003–2019. Kraków: Wydawnictwo Literackie. 2020. ISBN 978-83-08-07041-3.
- Próbuję być. Wybór wierszy z lat 1969–2020. Warszawa: Państwowy Instytut Wydawniczy. 2021. ISBN 978-83-8196-297-1.

== Bibliography ==
- "Janusz Szuber". biblioteka.sanok.pl. Archived from the original on 27 September 2007.
- Mączka, Janusz. "Janusz Szuber". culture.pl.
- Kto jest kim w Polsce (IV ed.). Warszawa. 2001. p. 939.
- Szuber, Janusz (2001). "Biogram Janusza Szubera". Las w lustrach / Forest in the Mirrors. Rzeszów: YES. p. 66. ISBN 83-911519-2-1.
- Skoczyński, Jan (2001). "Choroba i wiersze (szkic do portretu Janusza Szubera)". Rocznik Sanocki. VIII: 233–241.
- Osenkowski, Zbigniew (2001). "Kalendarium sanockie 1995–2000". Rocznik Sanocki. VIII.
- Szuber, Janusz (2003). "Biogram Janusza Szubera". Glina, ogień, popiół. Sanok. p. 42.
- Lewandowska, Janina (2003). ""Są takie szuflady. Raz na sto lat..."". Zeszyty Archiwum Ziemi Sanockiej. 3. Jubileusz Janusza Szubera. Fundacja „Archiwum Ziemi Sanockiej”: 66–69. ISSN 1731-870X.
- Strzelecka, Anna; Szuber, Janusz (2003). "Moi najbliżsi – zmyślenie i prawda". Zeszyty Archiwum Ziemi Sanockiej. 3. Jubileusz Janusza Szubera. Fundacja „Archiwum Ziemi Sanockiej”: 70–77. ISSN 1731-870X.
- Kowalewski, Jerzy (2005). Dramat istnienia – o poezji Janusza Szubera. Krosno. pp. 1–131.
- Szuber, Janusz (2005). Mojość. Sanok: Oficyna Wydawnicza Miejskiej Biblioteki Publicznej im. Grzegorza z Sanoka w Sanoku. pp. 1–108. ISBN 83-919470-8-4.
- Sulikowski, Andrzej (2010). Epos sanocki Janusza Szubera. Szczecin: Volumina.pl. pp. 1–316. ISBN 978-83-62355-59-4.
- Oberc, Franciszek (2014). "Samorząd miejski Sanoka a wybitni sanoczanie". Zeszyty Archiwum Ziemi Sanockiej. 11: Samorząd Gminy Miasta Sanoka 1990–2010. Fundacja „Archiwum Ziemi Sanockiej”: 533–534. ISSN 1731-870X.
- Jakubowska-Ożóg, Alicja (2019). "Wciałowzięty". Szkice o poezji Janusza Szubera. Rzeszów: Wydawnictwo Uniwersytetu Rzeszowskiego. Biblioteka „Frazy”. pp. 1–240. ISBN 978-83-7996-630-1.
- Adamski, Antoni (27 February 2005). "Moja domowa Galicja". nowiny24.pl.
