= Olchowce massacres =

Executions of Polish prisoners by Nazi forces

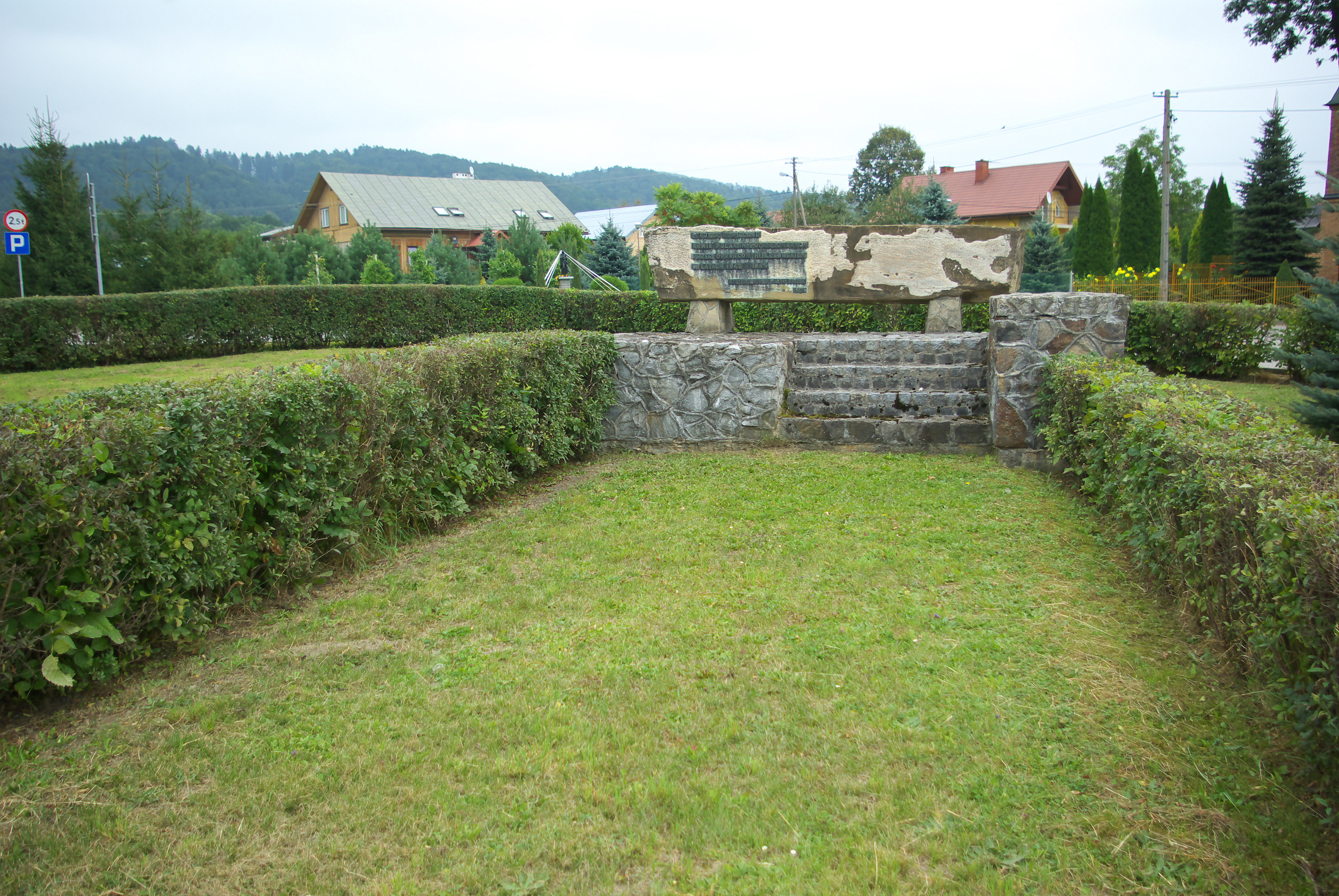
- Monument in Olchowce
- Date: 1942–1944
- Location: Olchowce, Poland under German occupation
- Type: Execution by shooting
- Perpetrator: Nazi Germany
- Deaths: 30–40

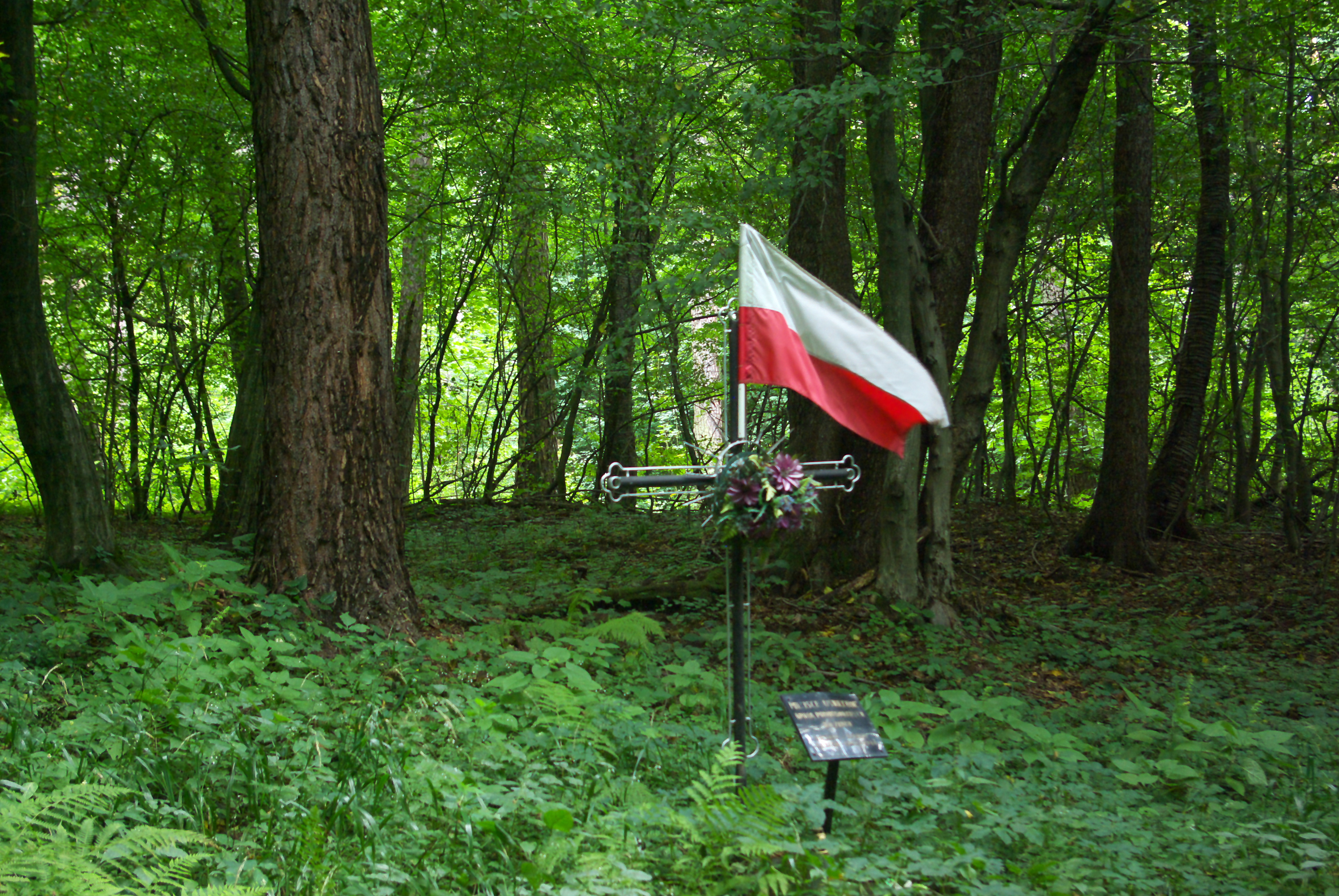
Memorial site in Olchowce

The Olchowce massacres were a series of executions carried out by Nazi German forces from 1942-44 in the village of Olchowce, in the present-day Sanok County in Poland.

== History ==
The executions in Olchowce took place during World War II under the German occupation in the years 1942, 1943, and 1944, within the then Landkreis Sanok. At the time, Olchowce was a village near Sanok town.

The victims were prisoners from the Sanok Prison. The executions were conducted by Gestapo officers, who transported individuals or groups of prisoners to Olchowce. The execution site was a forested area to the left of the road leading to Przemyśl, beyond the Orthodox Church of the Ascension. It was located at the edge of the forest, behind the embankment of a former military shooting range. Local gravediggers, Dymitr Dymiśko and Michał Krowiak, were tasked with burying the victims.

In the summer of 1942, two unidentified men were executed by shooting. In 1943, approximately 17 people, including men and women who spoke Polish, were brought to the site, stripped of their clothing, shot, and buried in three pre-dug graves. These executions were corroborated by post-war accounts from local residents, including Jan Milczanowski and Maria Niecpoń. On 23 January 1943, the victims included Andrzej Woźniak (aged 60), Janina Woźniak (aged 17), Katarzyna Woźniak (aged 57), and Michal Otocki from Tyrawa Wołoska. On 23 April 1943, Jan Łuczyński and Ludwika Łuczyńska from Bukowsko were executed. Additionally, witness Jan Milczanowski reported an execution of seven individuals, including three women. The victims were farmers who reportedly failed to comply with the occupation authorities' contingent obligations.

Among the victims was Sergeant/Second Lieutenant Władysław Szelka, codenamed Czajka and Borsuk, commander of the Niebieszczany post within the Sanok District of the Home Army. His execution, reportedly carried out by Gestapo officer Leo Humeniuk, occurred on 22 July 1944. Szelka was taken from the Sanok Prison along with another prisoner, Paul (or Paweł) Aleksiejewicz Karpenko (born 1921, a Soviet paratrooper and prisoner of war, arrested on 13 July). Both were driven to Olchowce and executed.

Estimates suggest that between 30 (for 1943–1944) and 40 (for 1942–1944) people were executed in Olchowce. Some sources indicate a higher number. No exhumation of the victims' bodies was conducted postwar. Most victims' identities remain unknown. Although the Germans maintained a Prisoner Register 1942–1944 for the Sanok Prison, no documentation confirming the executions was found. According to the Society of Fighters for Freedom and Democracy's sources, the victims were residents of Olchowce and nearby areas.

== Commemoration ==
Soil from the execution site was collected and placed in an urn at the Mausoleum of World War II Victims, established in 1948 at the cemetery on 15 Rymanowska Street in Sanok.

Initial plans to erect a monument at the execution site were abandoned. Instead, a monument was unveiled on 20 July 1975, during the celebrations of the "30th anniversary of the victory over fascism", on the eve of the National Day of the Rebirth of Poland. The monument was placed on 15 Przemyska Street, just before the aforementioned church, which post-war became part of the Roman Catholic Parish of the Ascension (Olchowce was incorporated into Sanok in 1972). The monument was described as "an obelisk in honor of fallen patriots". A 1980 guide by the Council for the Protection of Struggle and Martyrdom Sites referred to it as "a monument at the execution site". The monument commemorates Poles murdered by the Nazis between 1942 and 1944.

The initiative for the monument came from the Society of Fighters for Freedom and Democracy branch at Autosan, with Wiktor Gościński as the main proponent and organizer. The monument was designed by Dr. Wojciech Kurpik from the Museum of Folk Architecture. It was constructed through a community effort by Sanok residents, including Society of Fighters for Freedom and Democracy members and representatives of local businesses and institutions. The monument consists of a boulder placed horizontally on a pedestal. It bears an inscription:

A place sanctified by the blood of Poles murdered by Nazi oppressors in 1942–1944. The people of Sanok, 1974.

The monument is surrounded by a fence made of iron posts and chains. Both the inscription and Society of Fighters for Freedom and Democracy's records indicate the monument was erected in 1974. In the early 1990s, the execution site had an old plaque and remnants of a fence. Nearby, in the forested area, a cross and a plaque were placed with the inscription:

A place sanctified by the blood of murdered prisoners. Imprisoned in Sanok in 1942–1944.

Documents, accounts, and artifacts related to the wartime events in Olchowce were collected at the local School Memorial Room of National Remembrance.

== Bibliography ==
- Andrunik, Arnold (1986). Rozwój i działalność Związku Bojowników o Wolność i Demokrację na Ziemi Sanockiej w latach 1949–1984 [Development and Activities of the Union of Fighters for Freedom and Democracy in the Sanok Land in 1949–1984] (in Polish).
- Brygidyn, Andrzej (1992). Kryptonim "San". Żołnierze sanockiego Obwodu Związku Walki Zbrojnej – Armii Krajowej 1939–1944 [Codename "San". Soldiers of the Sanok District of the Home Army 1939–1944] (in Polish). Sanok: San.
