= First mass transport to Auschwitz concentration camp =

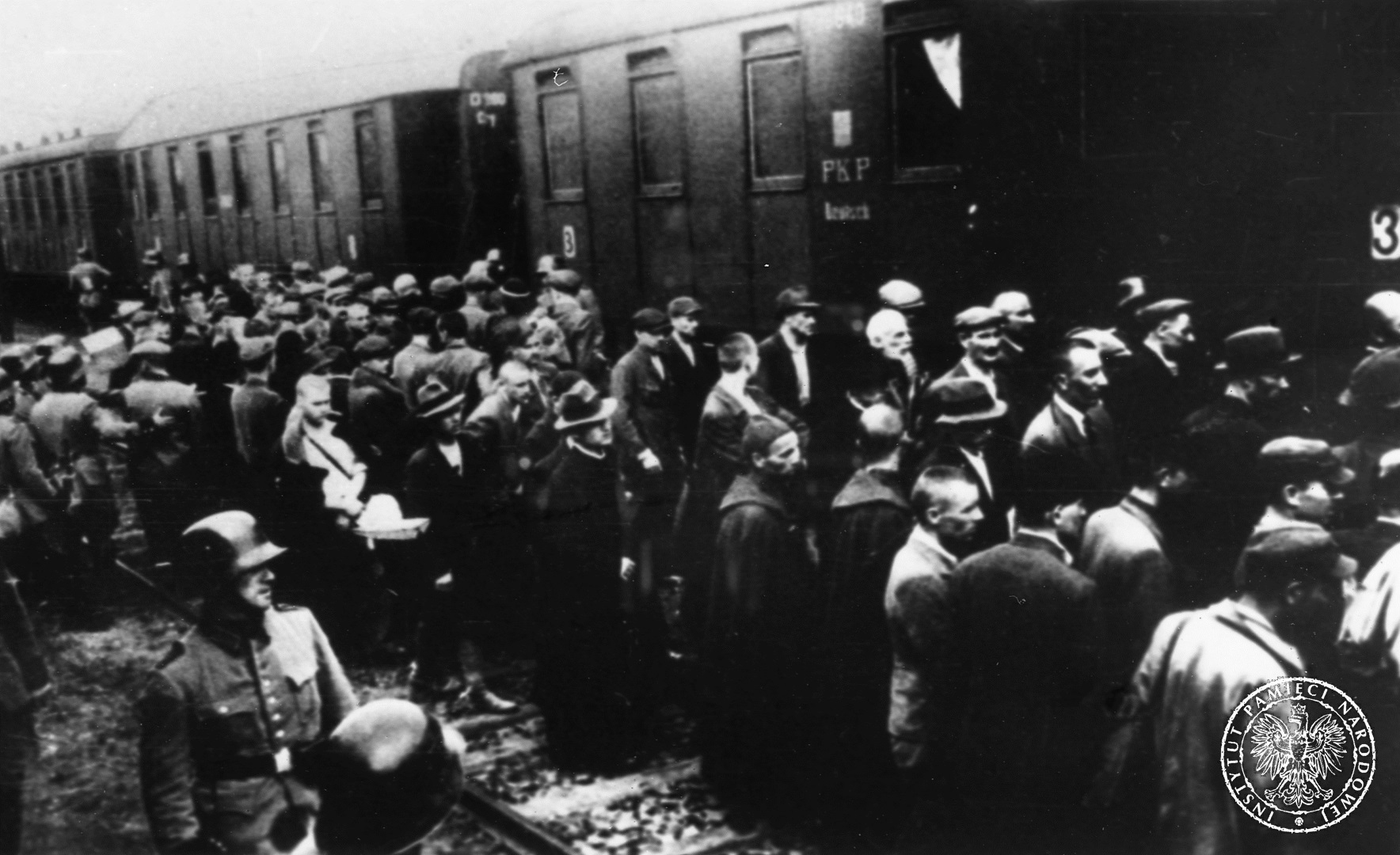
Prisoners of the first transport at the railway station in Tarnów. 14 June 1940

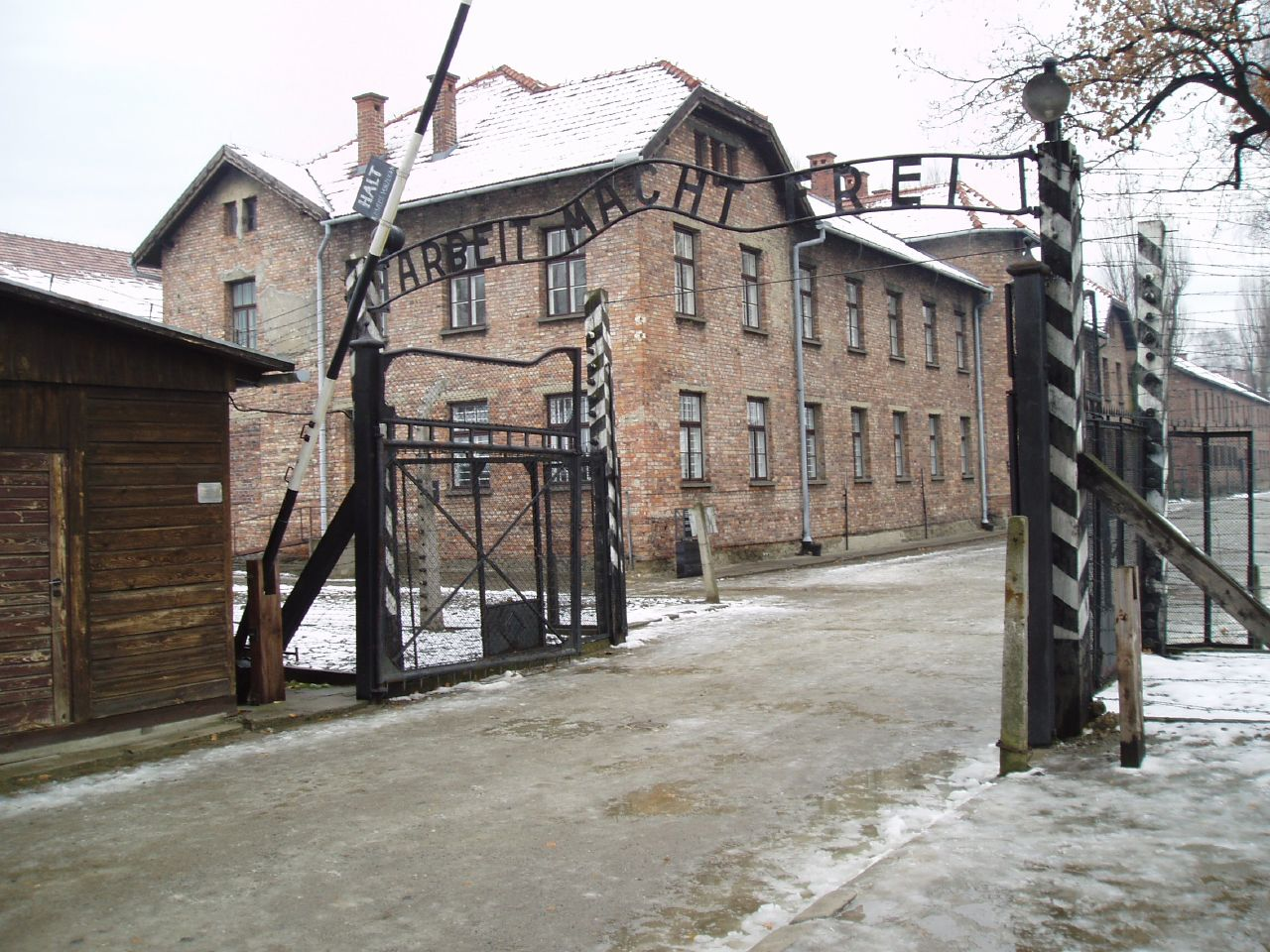
The gates to Auschwitz I

The first mass transport of prisoners by Nazi Germany to Auschwitz Concentration Camp was organized in occupied Poland on 14 June 1940 during World War II. The transport departed from the southern Polish city of Tarnów, and consisted of 728 Poles. They were dubbed 'political prisoners' and members of the Polish resistance. Most were Catholics, since the mass deportations of Jews had not yet begun. All were sent to Auschwitz by the German Sicherheitspolizei Security Police. They were transported there from a regular prison in Tarnów, where they had been incarcerated as enemies of the Nazi regime. Numbers were tattooed on the prisoners' arms in the order of their arrival at Auschwitz. These inmates were assigned the numbers 31 through 758, with numbers 1 through 30 having been reserved for a group of German criminals, who were brought to Auschwitz from Sachsenhausen, on 20 May and became the first Auschwitz kapos.

== Deportation history ==
Dubbed political prisoners by Nazi Germans, in reality, many of them including school teachers, lawyers, and priests were caught at the Nazi-Soviet demarcation line trying to cross the border to get to France through Hungary. According to Tarnów historian Aleksandra Pietrzykowa, on the evening before the transport, the 728 Polish prisoners were rounded up based on a previously prepared list, and ordered to take a shower and to disinfect themselves in a public bath. They were then detained until the early hours of 14 June, when the whole group, escorted by the SS, were marched out of the prison and along the deserted Tarnów streets to the railway station. There, all were pushed into the waiting rail cars.

Camp survivor Eugeniusz Niedojadlo, who was one of the group prisoners, recalled later: "The day of our departure was hot and sunny. We were walking in fours, guarded by armed SS men. The inhabitants of Tarnów were ordered to stay in their homes, and we had no idea where we were going".

Niedojadlo described the sprawling group as looking like a giant snake, and it gave him the impression of cattle being led to a slaughterhouse. "The SS were constantly yelling at us, and we were sad and depressed. Even though the streets were empty, here and there I saw curious faces looking at us from behind curtains. At one moment, an unknown hand tossed a bunch of red flowers towards us, but an SS officer trampled on it."

=== Prison records and survivor testimonies ===
Aleksandra Pietrzykowa wrote that 753 inmates were taken out of prison that day, but only 728 of them were interned at Auschwitz. According to Pietrzykowa: "In prison records, under the date June 13, 1940, a transport of 753 persons was mentioned. However, 25 persons less reached the camp. We have established that one person was released at the rail platform, just before departure of the train. According to the testimonies of other inmates — Jan Stojakowski (Auschwitz prisoner number 577) and Wladyslaw Pilat (Auschwitz prisoner number 330), the remaining 24 might have been prisoners from Stalowa Wola, who reached Auschwitz but for unknown reasons were brought back to Tarnów the next day. In Tarnów prison records, under the date June 15, 1940, there is a short entry: 'Transport Stalowa Wola, 24 persons'. We do not know what happened to these inmates and why they were transported back, if they were transported back at all."

The prisoner number 31, which opened the list of political prisoners of Auschwitz I, was given to Stanisław Ryniak, who was the first Polish prisoner in Auschwitz Ryniak, who was 24 years old in 1940, had been arrested by the Germans in his hometown of Sanok at the beginning of May and was accused of being a member of the Polish resistance. He was transported to Tarnów prison on 7 May, together with 18 Poles from Jarosław. (Ryniak survived Auschwitz and the aftermath of the Second World War; he died in Wrocław in 2004, aged 88.)

The prisoner number 243 was assigned to Jerzy Bielecki, a German-speaking Catholic Polish social worker who was 19 years old in 1940. He had been captured and arrested by the Gestapo while crossing the border with Hungary on 7 May 1940, en route to join the Polish Army in the West. He survived the ordeal for several years before managing to escape from the camp successfully in 1944, together with his Polish-Jewish girlfriend Cyla Cybulska, who was an inmate of Auschwitz II. (After the war Bielecki received the Righteous Among the Nations award.) He also co-founded and headed the postwar Christian Association of the Auschwitz Families.

The prisoner number 349 was assigned to the well-known Polish artist and Olympic skier Bronislaw Czech, who was captured in his hometown of Zakopane, also in May; he was killed in the camp four years later on 4 June 1944. The prisoner number 758, the last one of the transport, was assigned to Ignacy Plachta from Łódź. Plachta had been caught by the Gestapo in the southern town of Zagórz on 1 February 1940, while trying to escape to Hungary.

Upon arrival, the Poles lined up in five rows and were met by Schutzhaftlagerführer Hauptsturmführer Karl Fritzsch, who announced: "You have not come here to a sanatorium, but to a German concentration camp and there is no other way out than through the chimney of the crematorium. If one does not like that they can throw themselves on the wire immediately. If there are Jews in the transport they are allowed to live no more than two weeks, priests one month and the others three months." However, the crematorium did not begin operation until 15 August 1940.

In spite of these dismal prospects, Aleksandra Pietrzykowa established that around 200 members of the first transport survived. Eugeniusz Niedojadlo, who spent almost five years in Auschwitz, said that members of the first transport tried to stick together throughout their internment. The Tarnów inmates also cooperated with other Polish inmates, from the nearby city of Rzeszów.

Today, the square in front of former public bath in Tarnów is called the Square of Auschwitz Inmates, and in 1975, a monument commemorating the departure of the first transport to Auschwitz was unveiled there.

== Notable prisoners ==
The following notable prisoners were on the transport:

- number 77: Tadeusz Pietrzykowski
- number 243: Jerzy Bielecki
- number 290: Wiesław Kielar
- number 349: Bronisław Czech
- number 564: Jan Komski
- number 716: Rena Kornreich Gelissen
