= Stanisław Ryniak =

Polish political prisoner

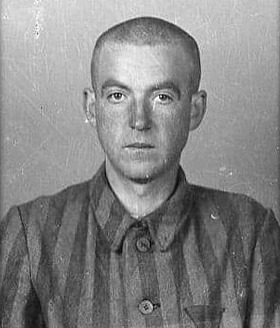
- Stanisław Ryniak (KL Auschwitz)
- Born: 21 November 1915; Sanok, Poland
- Died: 13 February 2004 (aged 88); Wrocław
- Education: Wrocław University of Science and Technology
- Occupation: Architect
- Known for: First inmate of Auschwitz

Stanisław Ryniak (21 November 1915 – 13 February 2004) was a Polish political prisoner of Auschwitz concentration camp during the Second World War. He was the first Polish prisoner in Auschwitz (that is, the one with the lowest number – 31).

In May 1940, when he was 24, Ryniak was arrested by the Germans in his hometown of Sanok and was accused of being a member of the Polish resistance. He was transported to Tarnów prison on 7 May, together with 18 Poles from Jarosław, and arrived at Auschwitz on 14 June 1940, in the first mass transport of prisoners to the camp.

Numbers were tattooed on prisoners' arms in the order of their arrival. The first 30 numbers were given to German criminal prisoners who would serve as camp guards. Ryniak's number was 31.

He is buried in Wrocław, Poland.

== Honours ==
- Commander's Cross of the Order of Polonia Restituta (2000)
- Officer's Cross of the Order of Polonia Restituta
- Knight's Cross of the Order of Polonia Restituta
- Auschwitz Cross
- Silver Cross of Merit (1954)
