= Zdzisław Peszkowski =

Polish Roman Catholic priest

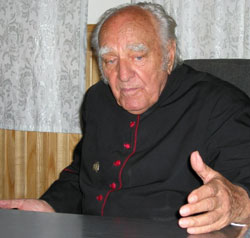
- Zdzisław Peszkowski
- Born: August 23, 1918; Sanok, Galicia (now Poland)
- Died: October 8, 2007 (aged 89); Warsaw, Poland
- Resting place: National Temple of Divine Providence in Warsaw, Poland; 52.15861°N 21.07111°E
- Education: Polish University in Exile; University of Oxford
- Alma mater: SS. Cyril and Methodius Seminary
- Occupation: Roman Catholic Priest
- Known for: Katyń Massacre Survivor; Chaplain to Pope John Paul II
- Title: Monsignor

This article has been partially translated from the Polish Wikipedia article.

Zdzisław Peszkowski (Polish pronunciation: [ˈʑd͡ʑis̪waf]) (August 23, 1918 – October 8, 2007), of the Jastrzębiec coat of arms was a Polish Roman Catholic priest and one of a small group of Polish army officers who managed to survive the 1940 mass execution of 22,000 Polish citizens by NKVD, the Katyn massacre. Peszkowski was a leading advocate and chaplain for the Federation of Katyn Families, which works with survivors of the Katyn massacre and their families.

== Early life ==
Zdzisław Peszkowski was born in 1918 in Sanok (Ukrainian: Сянiк; Syanik; Yiddish: Sonik), in Galicia before the dissolution of Austro-Hungarian Empire. After World War I, the town was incorporated into the Second Polish Republic. After completing high school in 1938 he was drafted into the Polish Cavalry.

== Military ==
Peszkowski was a Sergeant, leading a platoon of the 20th Uhlan Regiment of King Jan III Sobieski (Polish: 20 Pułk Ułanów), during the Invasion of Poland by Nazi Germany.

After the Soviet invasion of Poland, almost the whole regiment was captured by the Red Army. Prisoners were interned initially in Pomorzany. There, the painter Wlastimil Hofman portrayed the prisoners in small portraits. These portraits, including one of Zdzisław Peszkowski, were to be sent to the prisoners' families. In October 1939, Peszkowski was transported from Poland into the Soviet Union to a POW camp, established in the Optina Monastery in Kozelsk (Russian: Козе́льск) for Polish prisoners taken captive by the Red Army. In May 1940, he was transported from Kozelsk to a camp called Pavlishchev Bor, and then to Gryazovets (Russian: Гря́зовец; Polish: Griazowca).

In 1941, following Operation Barbarossa and the Sikorski-Maisky agreement he was released during the Amnesty for Polish citizens in the Soviet Union and joined the Polish Armed Forces in the East being formed in Buzuluk (Russian: Бузулу́к). He was promoted to Rotmistrz and lead a company in the 1st Krechowce Uhlan Regiment (Polish: 1 Pułk Ułanów Krechowieckich). In the spring of 1942 the organizing formation was moved to the area of Tashkent (Uzbek: Toshkent, Тошкент), Uzbekistan. In the second part of 1942, the formation was transferred through the Persian Corridor to the British Middle East Command as a military occupation force after the Anglo-Soviet invasion of Iran.

== Priesthood ==
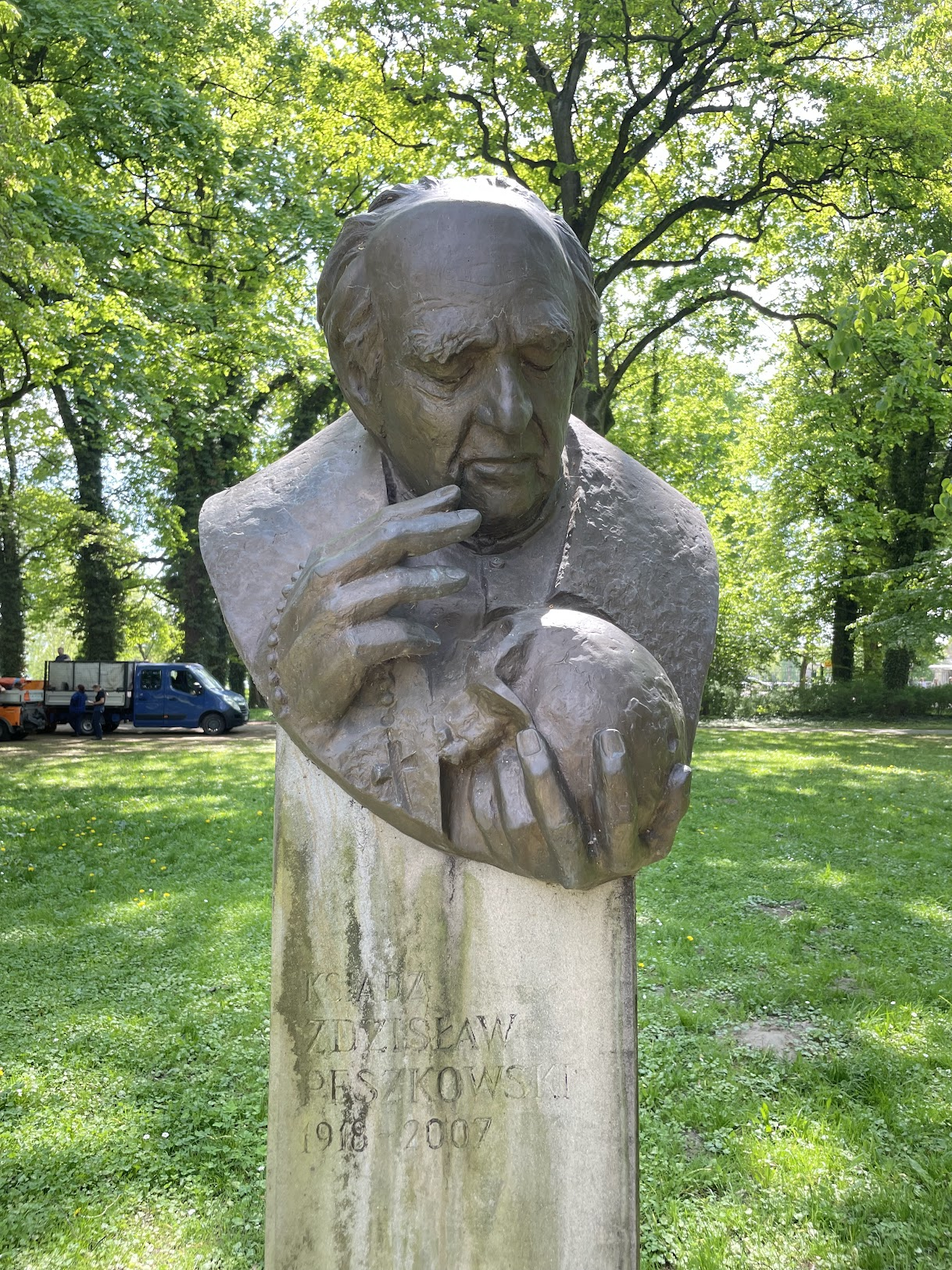
Bust of Zdzislaw Peszkowski, sculpted by Fr. Robert Kruczek SDB found in Henryk Jordan Park, Kraków

Peszkowski left the army following World War II and was ordained a Roman Catholic priest. He became a leading advocate for the remembrance of the Katyn massacre and the murder of Poles elsewhere in the country during the war. He also became a chaplain for Polish families of the Katyn massacres. He preached forgiveness for the perpetrators of Katyn. He called for forgiveness for those who killed Polish army officers during a speech at Warsaw's Unknown Soldiers' Grave in 1995.

June 4, 2007 was the last Katyn remembrance ceremony where Peszkowski took part. He laid a cornerstone for a memorial at the cemetery for Polish army officers in Katyn. He told those gathered that he hoped the tragedies that happened to Poland during World War II would serve as a warning against hatred to the rest of the world.

Zdzisław Peszkowski died in Warsaw, Poland, at the age of 89. He remained a chaplain for the Katyn families until his death.
