= Folk Dance Ensemble Sanok =

Logo

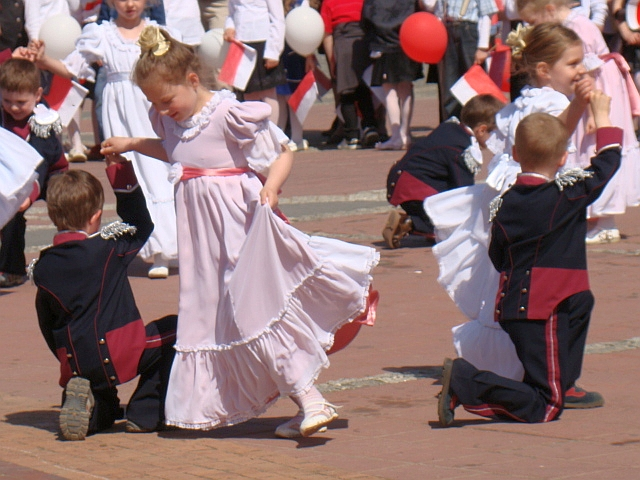
Young artists, Sanok 2010

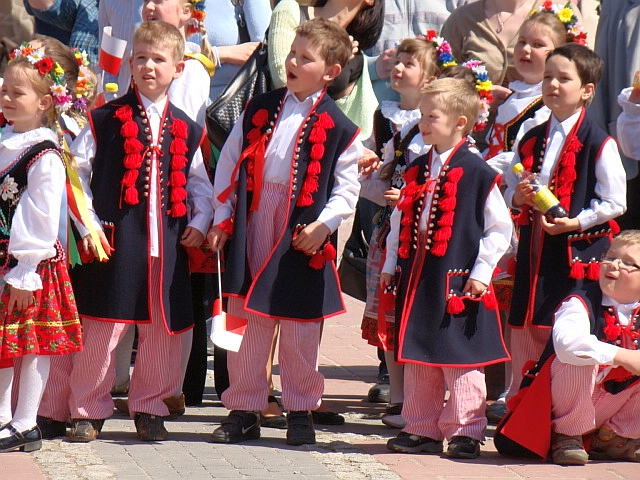
Sanok, 2010

Folk Dance Ensemble Sanok (in Polish: Zespół Tańca Ludowego "Sanok") is one of the regional Polish folk ensembles. It is based in Sanok.

The group was formed in 1993 as a part of then Folk Dance Ensemble Autosan (e. 1960s) and Cultural House in Sanok.
