= Sanok =

- Królewskie Wolne Miasto Sanok; Royal Free City of Sanok
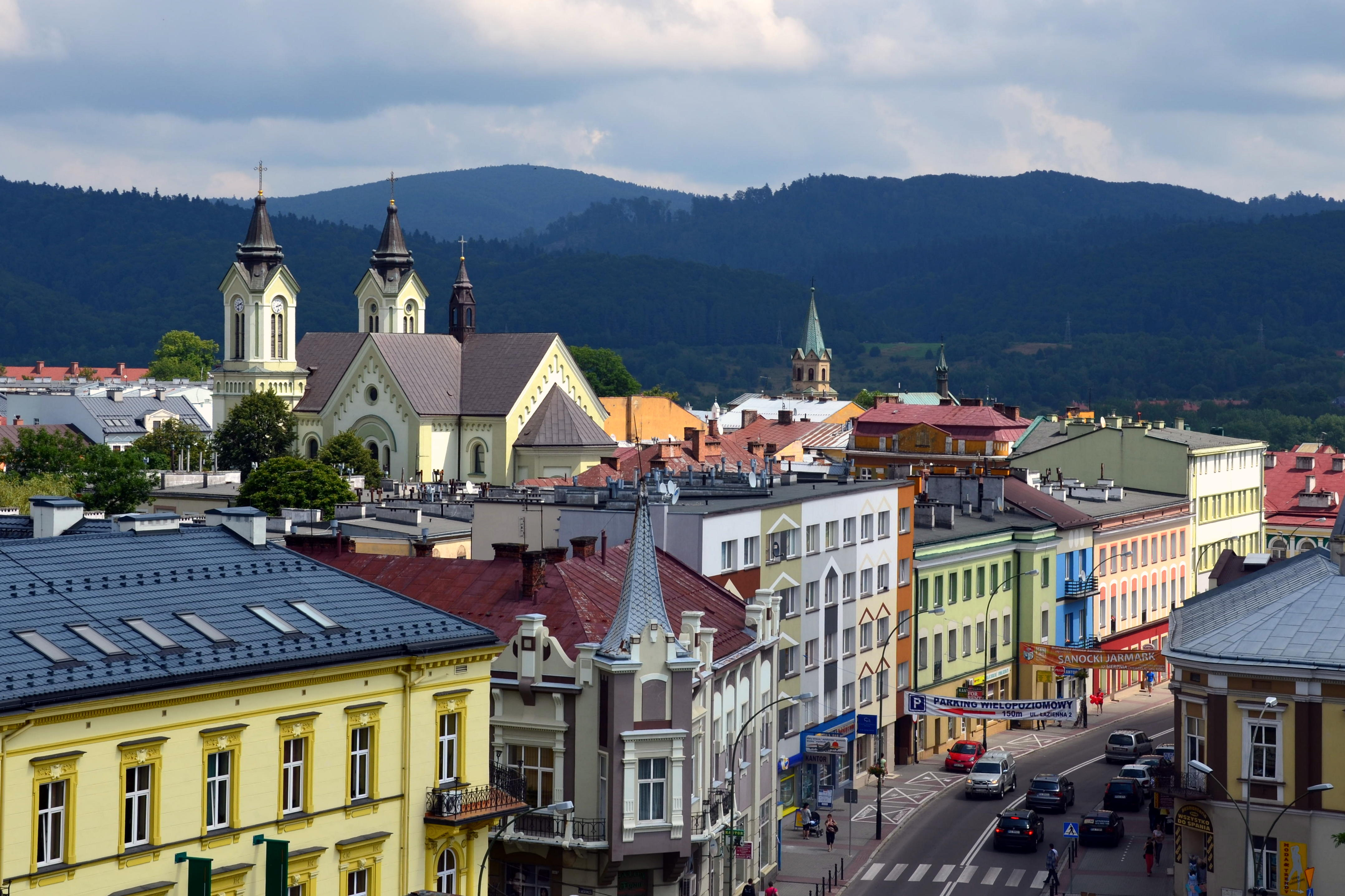
- Town panorama with the Cathedral and the Carpathian Mountains in the background.

- Flag Coat of arms
- Motto: Libera Regia Civitas; Free Royal City
- Location within Poland
- Coordinates: 49°33′N 22°13′E
- Country: Poland
- Voivodeship: Subcarpathian
- County: Sanok
- Gmina: Sanok (urban gmina)
- Established: before 12th century
- Town rights: 1339

Government
  - Mayor: Tomasz Matuszewski

Area
  - Total: 54.9 km^{2} (21.2 sq mi)

Population (2021)
  - Total: 36,703
  - Density: 669/km^{2} (1,730/sq mi)
- Demonym(s): sanoczanin (male) sanoczanka (female) (pl)
- Time zone: UTC+1 (CET)
  - Summer (DST): UTC+2 (CEST)
- Postal code: 38-500
- Area code: +48 13
- Car plates: RSA
- Website: http://www.sanok.pl

Sanok, (Note: Polish: [ˈsanɔk]; Rusyn: Санок, Sanok; Ukrainian: Сянок or Cянік, Sianok or Sianik; Latin: Sanocum; Yiddish: סאָניק, Sūnik or Sonik) in full the Royal Free City of Sanok, (Note: Polish: Królewskie Wolne Miasto Sanok) is a town in the Subcarpathian Voivodeship of southeastern Poland with 38,397 inhabitants, as of June 2016. Located on the San River and around 52 km (32 mi) south of Przemyśl, Sanok lies directly by the Carpathian Mountains.

The town's history goes back over a thousand years to when it was part of a medieval trade route. The Museum of Folk Architecture as well as the refurbished Sanok Castle and Old Town are popular points of interest. The region also features a 70 km (43 mi) trail for hikers and cyclists.

== Geography ==
The city of Sanok is the capital of Sanok County in the Subcarpathian Voivodeship in Poland. Previously, it was in the Krosno Voivodeship (1975–1998) and in the Ruthenian Voivodeship (1340–1772), which was part of the Cherven Cities/Red Ruthenia region, and in wider sense, of the Lesser Poland Province (not of Lesser Poland proper). Historically, it was part of the Land of Sanok.

This historic city is situated on the San River at the foot of Castle Hill in the Lesser Poland (Małopolska) region. It lies in a wooded, hilly area near the national road number 28, which runs along southern Poland, from Ustrzyki Dolne to Wadowice (340 km or 211 mi away). It is located in the heartland of the Pogórze Bukowskie part of Doły (Pits), and its average elevation is 300 m (984 ft) above sea level, although there are some hills located within the confines of the city.

Sanok is located on the bank of the river San. The area surrounding mountain range stretches between the Wisłok, Osława and San Rivers in the Salt Mountains (Central Beskidian Piedmont), in the inland with temperateness climate. The hills of the Bieszczady mountain range are typical for this countryside. Sanok County is bordered by Krosno County to the west, Brzozów County to the north, Przemyśl County to the north-east and Lesko County to the east. It also borders Slovakia to the south. Before World War II, the Oslawa and San Rivers line was designated the wild frontier between Poles and Lemkos.

The city is a member of Carpathian Euroregion, which is designed to bring together the people who inhabit the region of the Carpathian Mountains and to facilitate their cooperation in the fields of science, culture, education, trade, tourism and economy.

== History ==
=== Middle Ages ===
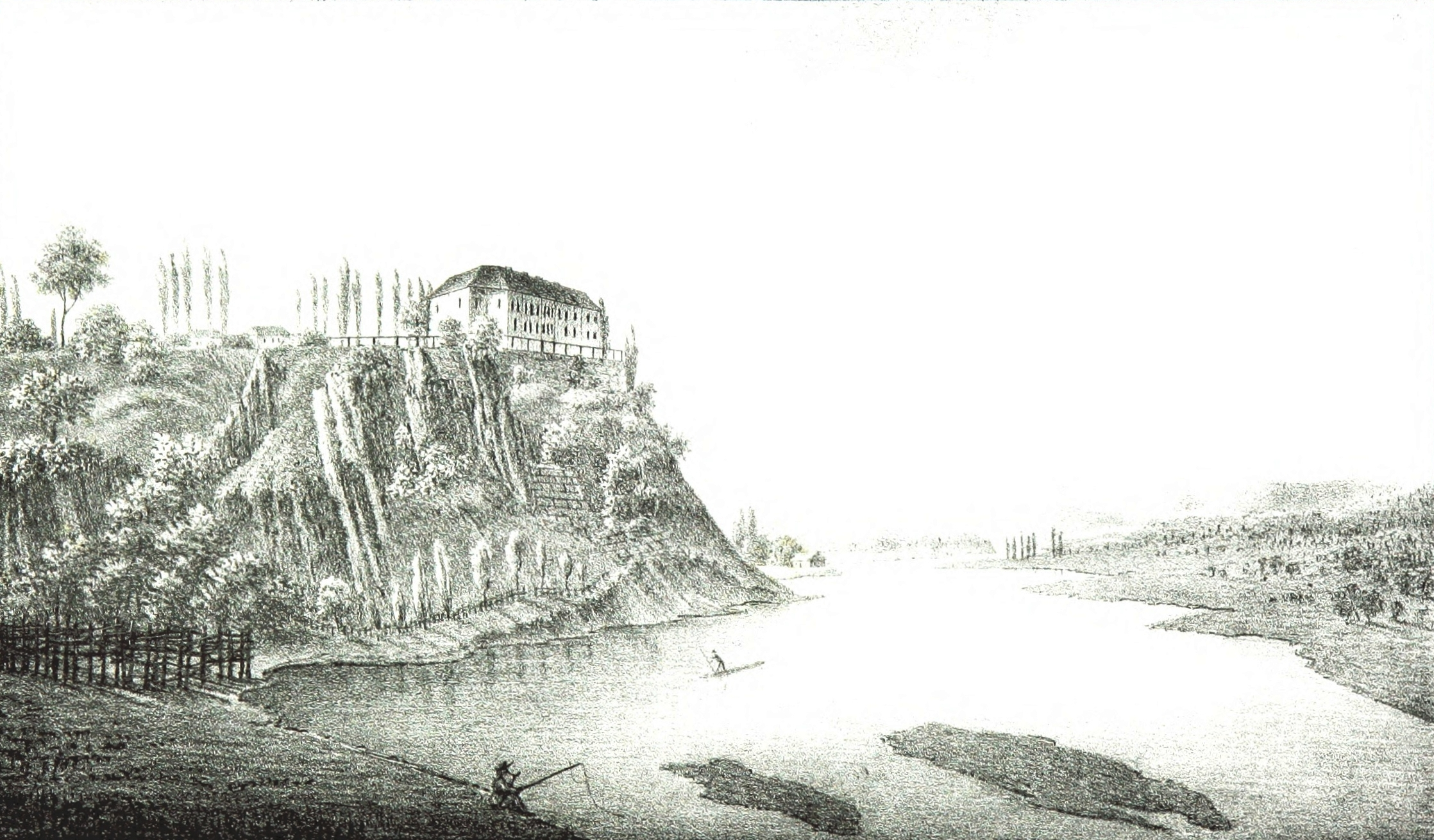
An 1847 drawing of Sanok Royal Castle overlooking the San River

The earliest mention of the region where Sanok is located comes from Nestor the Chronicler, who described how in 981, the surrounding areas, along with several Cherven gords, then inhabited by the West Slavic tribe of Lendians, was made a part of Red Ruthenia, when Vladimir I of Kiev invaded the land and took it over from the Duchy of Poland. In 1018, the settlement along with the surrounding region returned to Poland, and in 1031, was again recaptured by Rus'. Sanok and the region then again returned to Poland in 1069, only to be made part of Rus' in 1085. In 1339, the town was given the Magdeburg law by Boleslaw-Yuri II of Galicia.

Sanok was mentioned in the Ruthenian Hypatian Codex chronicle, where one can read that in the year 1150: The Hungarian King Géza II of Hungary crossed the mountains and seized the stronghold of Sanok with its governor as well as many villages in the Przemyśl area. The same chronicle refers to Sanok twice more, stating that in 1205 it was the meeting place of a Ruthenian princess Anna and a Hungarian king, and that in 1231 a Ruthenian prince made an expedition to "Sanok - Hungarian Gate".

During the Galicia–Volhynia Wars, Sanok was seized by King Casimir III of Poland, who reconfirmed its municipal status on 25 April 1366, and made it a royal city of the Polish Crown. At that time Sanok became the centre of a new administrative district called Sanok Land, a part of the Ruthenian Voivodeship. Several courts of justice operated in the town, including the municipal and rural courts of lower instance and also the higher instance court for the entire Sanok Land, based on the German town law. Germans settled in the territory of the Kingdom of Poland (territory of present-day Subcarpathian Voivodeship) from the 14th to 16th centuries (see Ostsiedlung), mostly after the region returned to Poland in 1340, when Casimir III of Poland took the Czerwień towns.

Marcin Bielski states that Bolesław I the Brave had settled some Germans in the region to defend the borders against Hungary and Kievan Rus', who later turned to farming. Maciej Stryjkowski mentions German peasants near Przeworsk, Przemyśl, Sanok, and Jarosław, describing them as good farmers. The region was also traditionally inhabited by subgroups of the Rusyn people: Lemkos and Boykos.

=== Modern period ===
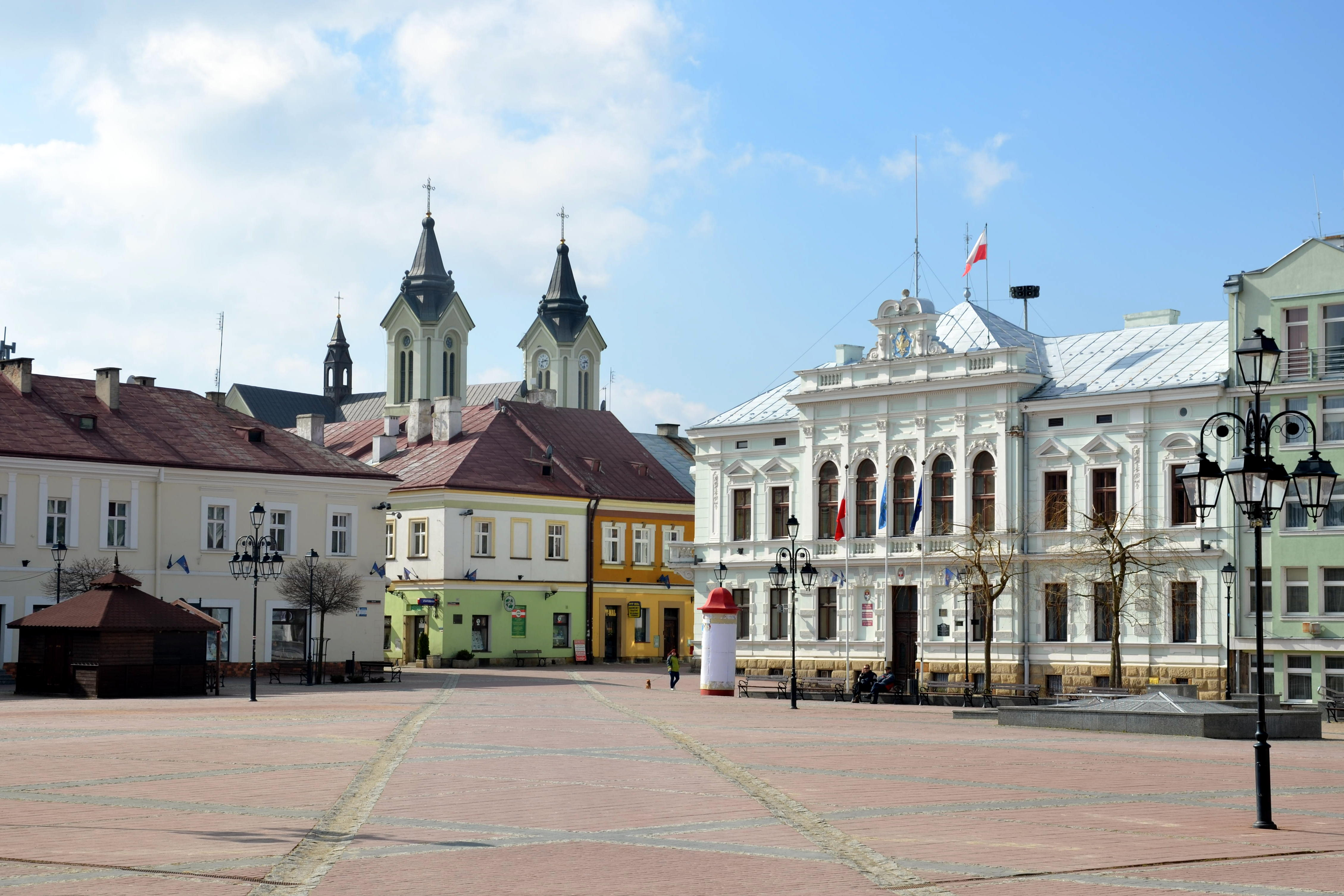
Main Market Square in Sanok

As early at the 17th century, an important trade route went across Sanok connecting the interior of Hungary with Poland through the Łupków Pass. As a result of the First Partition of Poland (Treaty of St-Petersburg dated 5 July 1772), Sanok was annexed by the Austrian Habsburg monarchy. At that time, Sanok and the surrounding region (including west and east of Subcarpathian Voivodship) became known as the Galicia province, within the Habsburg Kingdom of Galicia and Lodomeria.

In the mid-18th century, 47.7% of the town's population was Roman Catholic (Polish), 36.4% Jewish, and 14.7% Greek Catholic (Ruthenian). The Galician peasant revolt took place in the region during the revolutions of 1848.

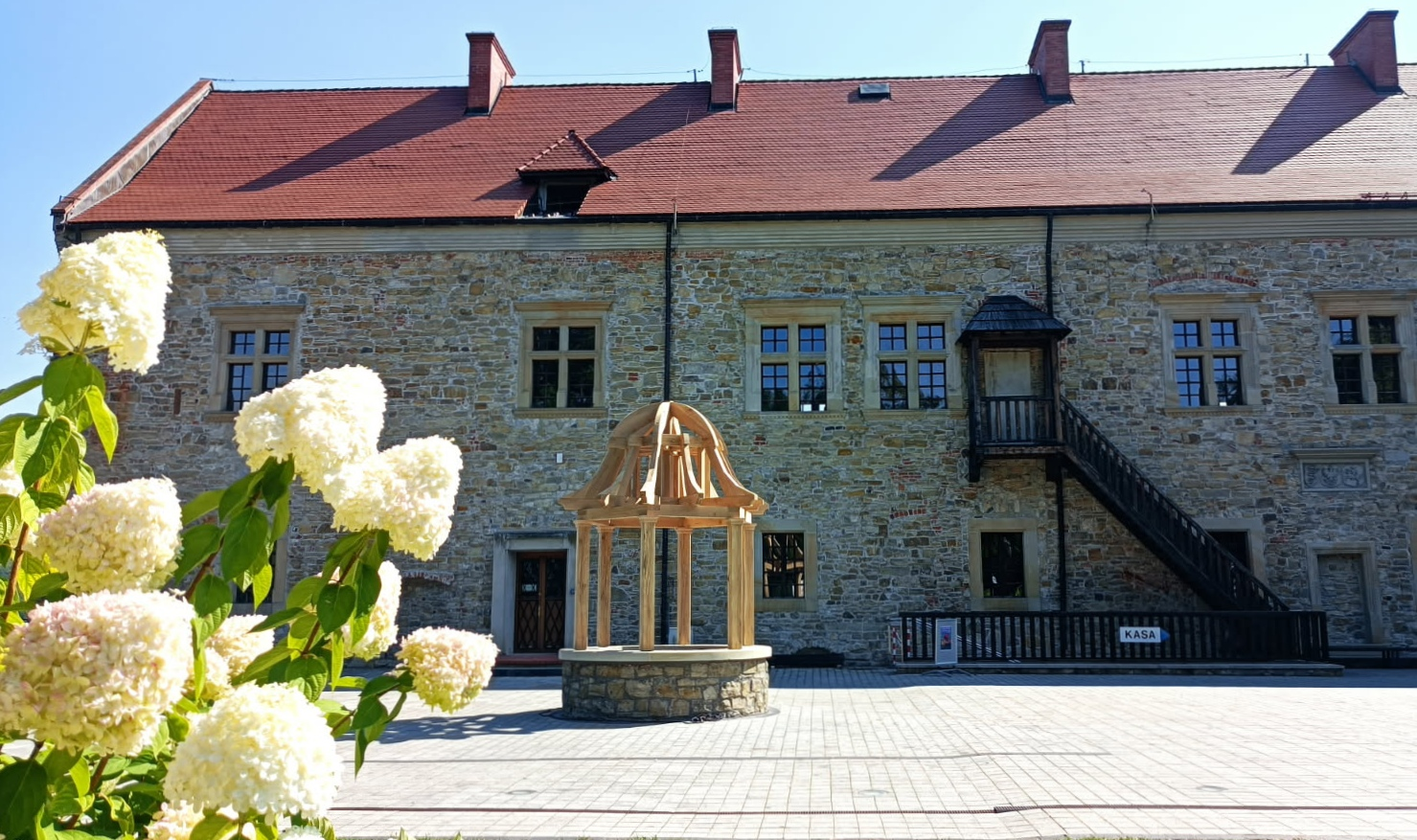
Courtyard of the Sanok Castle

The course of the river Dunajec and that of the San, both in West Galicia, marked the two successive stages in the breakthrough battle which initiated the Austro-German offensive of 1915 on the eastern front. An attempt to hold the line of the Wisłok river and the Łupków Pass failed before renewed Austro-German attacks on 8 May 1915. Wisłok Valley was one of the strategically important Carpathian rivers bitterly contested in battles on the Eastern Front of World War I during the winter of 1914–1915.

During World War I, the Russian army occupied the town from May until July, 1915 and significantly damaged the town. The town was subsequently occupied by troops of the Austro-Hungarian Empire.

In 1918 Poland regained independence and control of the town and within the interwar Second Polish Republic it was the seat of the Sanok County in the Lwów Voivodeship. Sanok was known as a centre of Ukrainian movement in Galicia, and of cultural heritage of the Lemkos and other Rusyns.

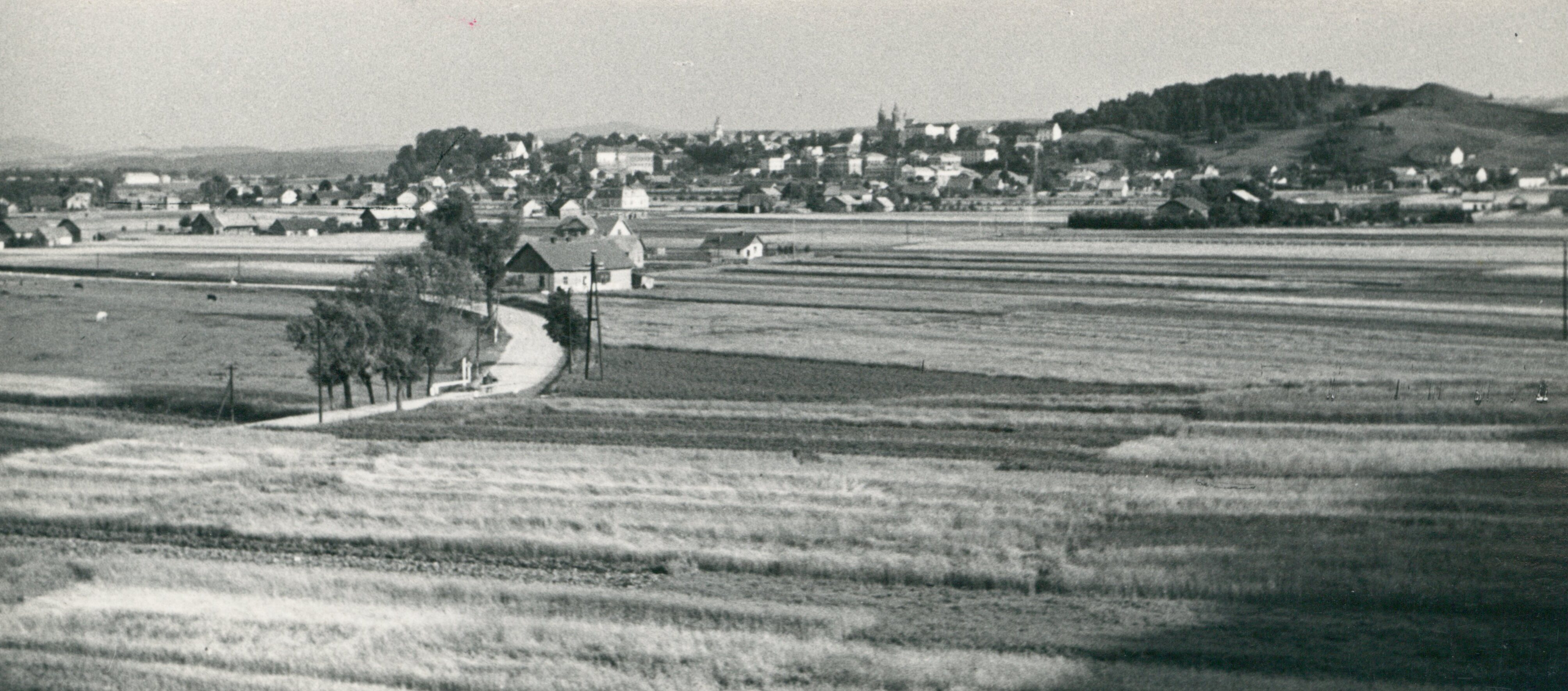
Sanok, before 1936

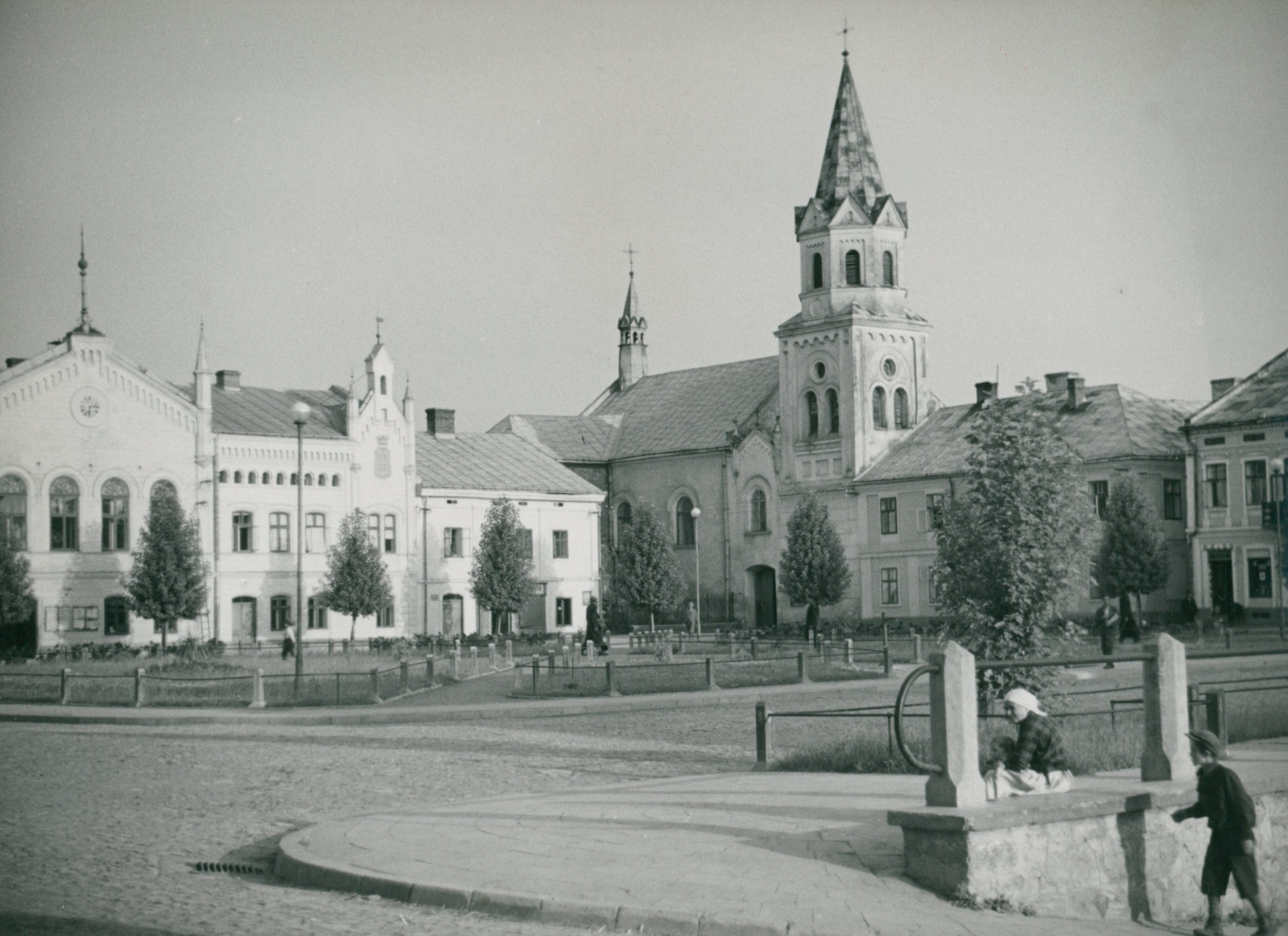
Sanok in the interwar period

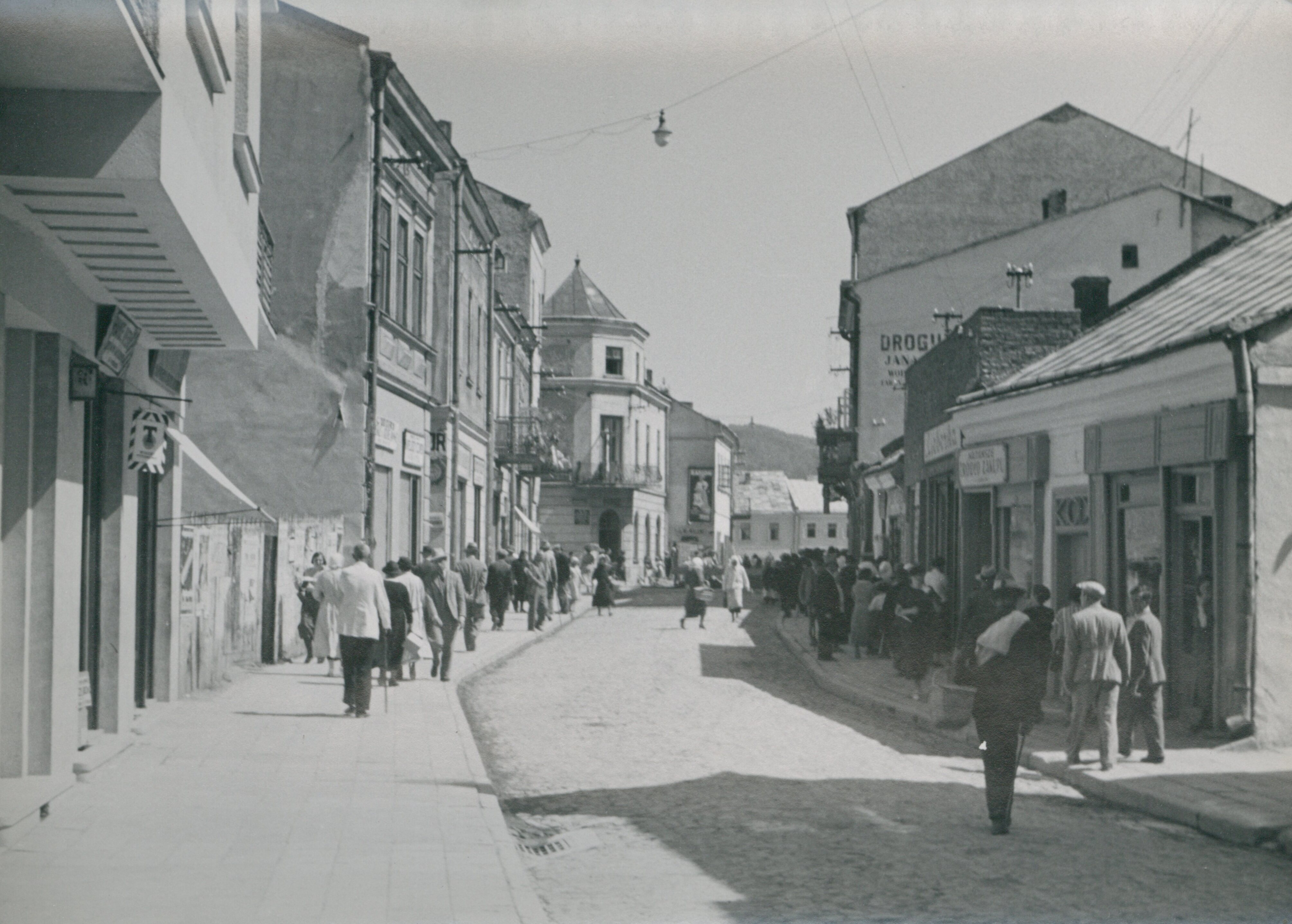
Jagiellońska Street, before 1936

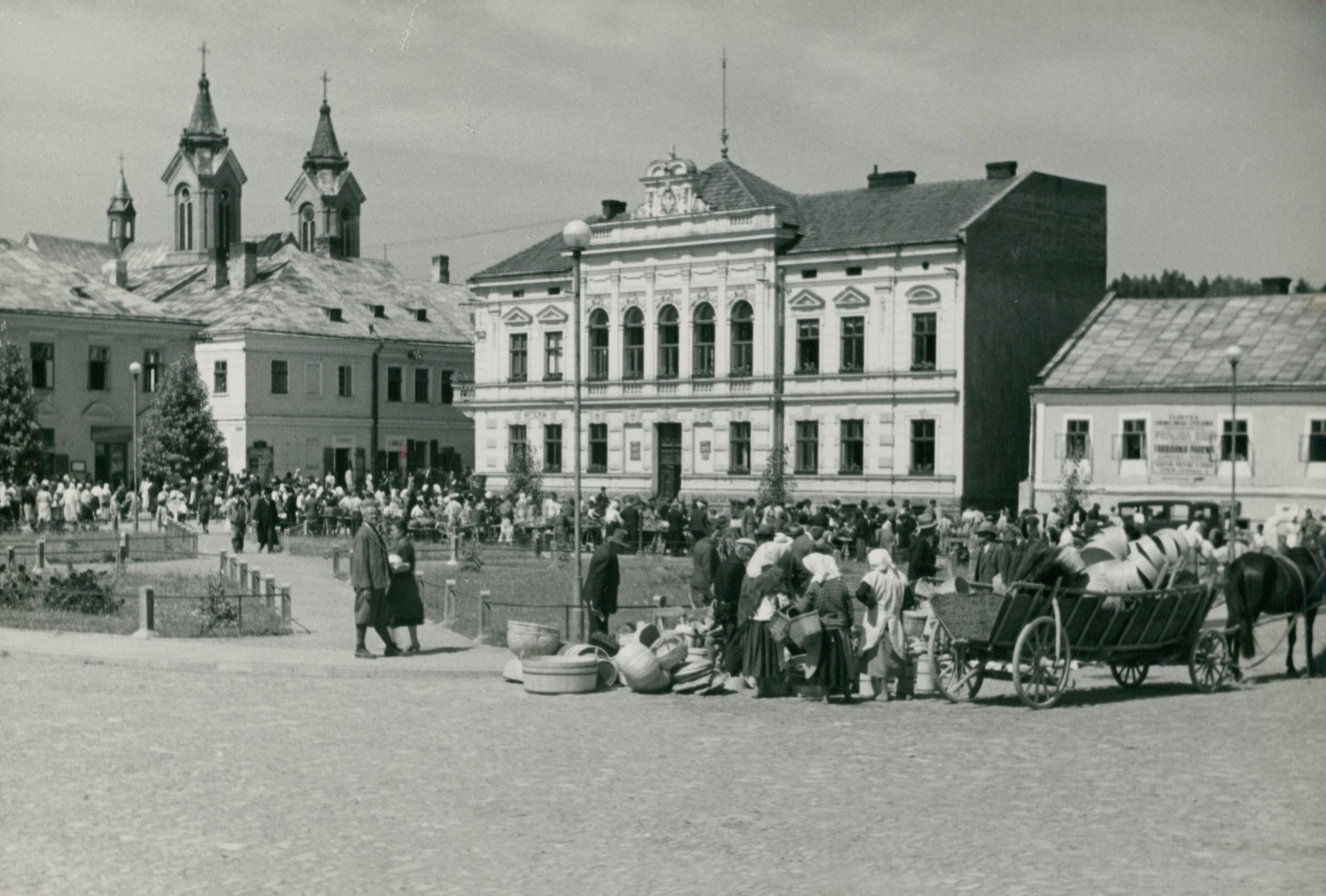
Market square, before 1936

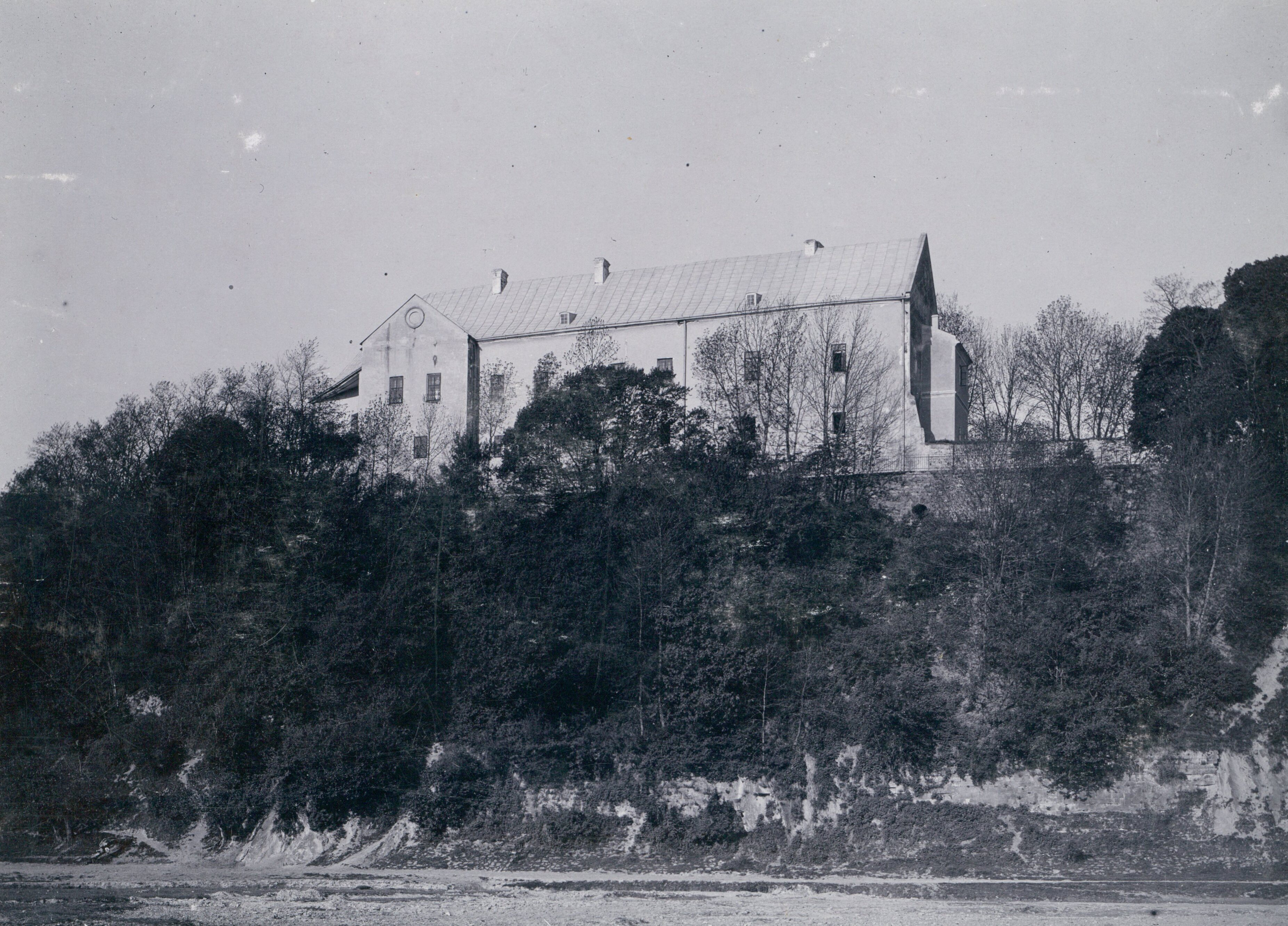
Castle, before 1897

=== World War II ===
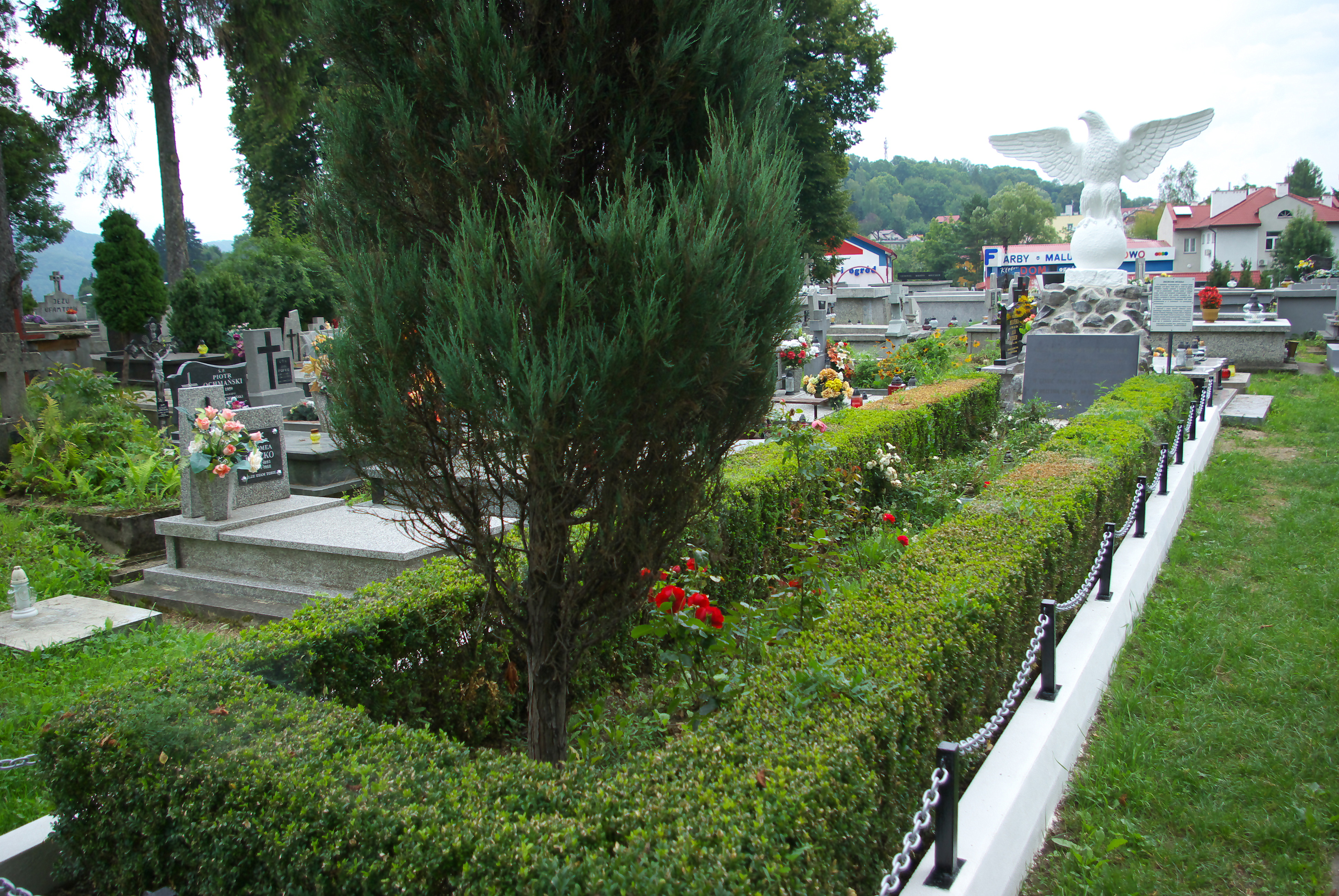
Mass grave of Poles massacred by the Germans at the Gruszka mountain

The Jewish population of Sanok may have comprised nearly 30% of the total population in the early 20th century. During the joint German–Soviet invasion of Poland, which started World War II, in September 1939, it was invaded by Germany, and the Einsatzgruppe I entered the town on September 25, 1939, to commit various atrocities against the populace. In 1939–1940, the Germans imprisoned many Poles in the local prison, especially those who tried to escape occupation to take refuge in Hungary. The Germans then massacred 112 Poles at the Gruszka mountain near Tarnawa Dolna. The victims are buried at the Central Cemetery in Sanok. At the beginning of the German occupation during World War II, the Jewish population was around 5,000. During the occupation, most of the Jews were either executed or killed in Nazi death camps or Nazi concentration camps during the Holocaust. Some of the actions against the Jews were assisted by local auxiliaries and hundreds of the deaths occurred in Sanok itself, while the Polish resistance movement established the secret Polish Council to Aid Jews "Żegota", which operated in the town. Buildings that had been owned by Jews were taken over by the local population. The local Jewish cemetery still exists. Several hundred Jews are thought to have survived, most of whom fled to the Soviet Union at the beginning of the war. Some of the Jews emigrated to Canada and the United States in the early 1900s with Sanoker Burial Societies spreading throughout New York and other regions where they settled.

In 1942, Sanok was the location of the Stalag 327 prisoner-of-war camp, following its relocation from Jarosław and before its further relocation to Przemyśl. Afterwards the present-day district of Olchowce was the location of a subcamp of Stalag 327, in which some 7,000-10,000 POWs died.

In 1943 the foundation of the Waffen-SS Division Galizien took place among the Ukrainian minority in Sanok, with many locals volunteering in the ethnic Ukrainian Waffen-SS. Because of material support and assistance provided by the Ukrainian minority to the Ukrainian Insurgent Army, which was waging a battle for Ukrainian separatism against the Polish state, new Soviet-installed communist authorities deported the Ukrainian (and Lemko) population of Sanok and its region to the Recovered Territories attached to Poland after World War II during Operation Vistula (1946–1947). Some of the Lemkos expelled returned to Sanok in 1957-58 and others after 1989.

Sanok contains an open-air museum called a skansen in the Biała Góra district, where examples of architecture from all of the region's main ethnic groups have been moved and carefully reassembled in a skansen evoking everyday rural life in the 19th century.

== Archaeology ==
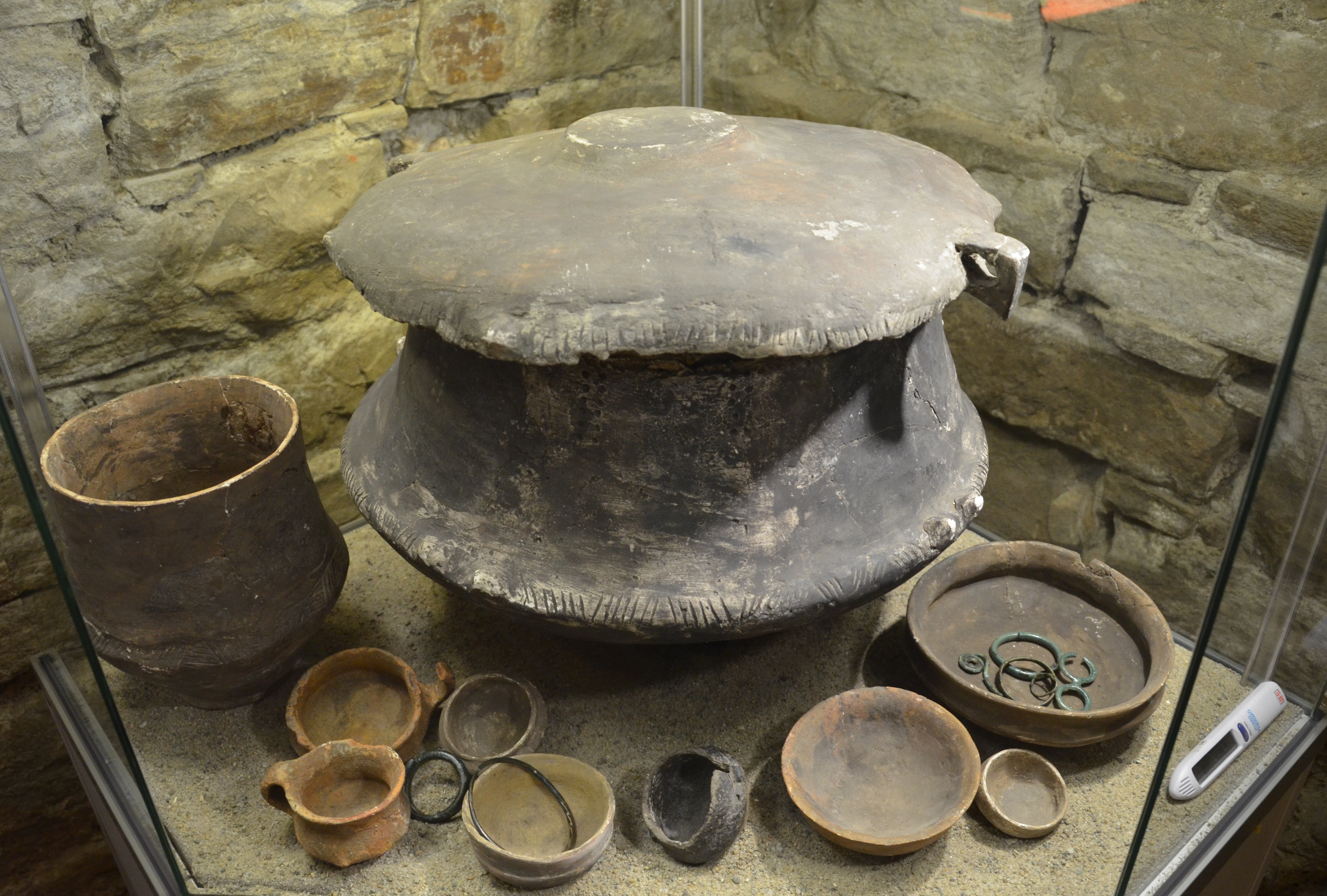
Lusatian culture pots on display at the Sanok's archaeology museum

Settled in prehistoric times, the south-eastern Poland region that is now Subcarpathia was overrun in pre-Roman times by various tribes, including the Celts (Anarti), Goths and Vandals (Przeworsk culture and Púchov culture). In the Middle Ages, the area was inhabited by the Polish tribe of Lendians, and the area was also invaded by Hungarians, before it eventually became part of the emerging Polish state in the 10th century.

The region subsequently became part of the Great Moravian state. Upon the invasion of the Hungarian tribes into the heart of the Great Moravian Empire around 899, the Lendians of the area declared their allegiance to Hungarian Empire. The region then became a site of contention between Poland, Kievan Rus' and Hungary starting in at least the 9th century.

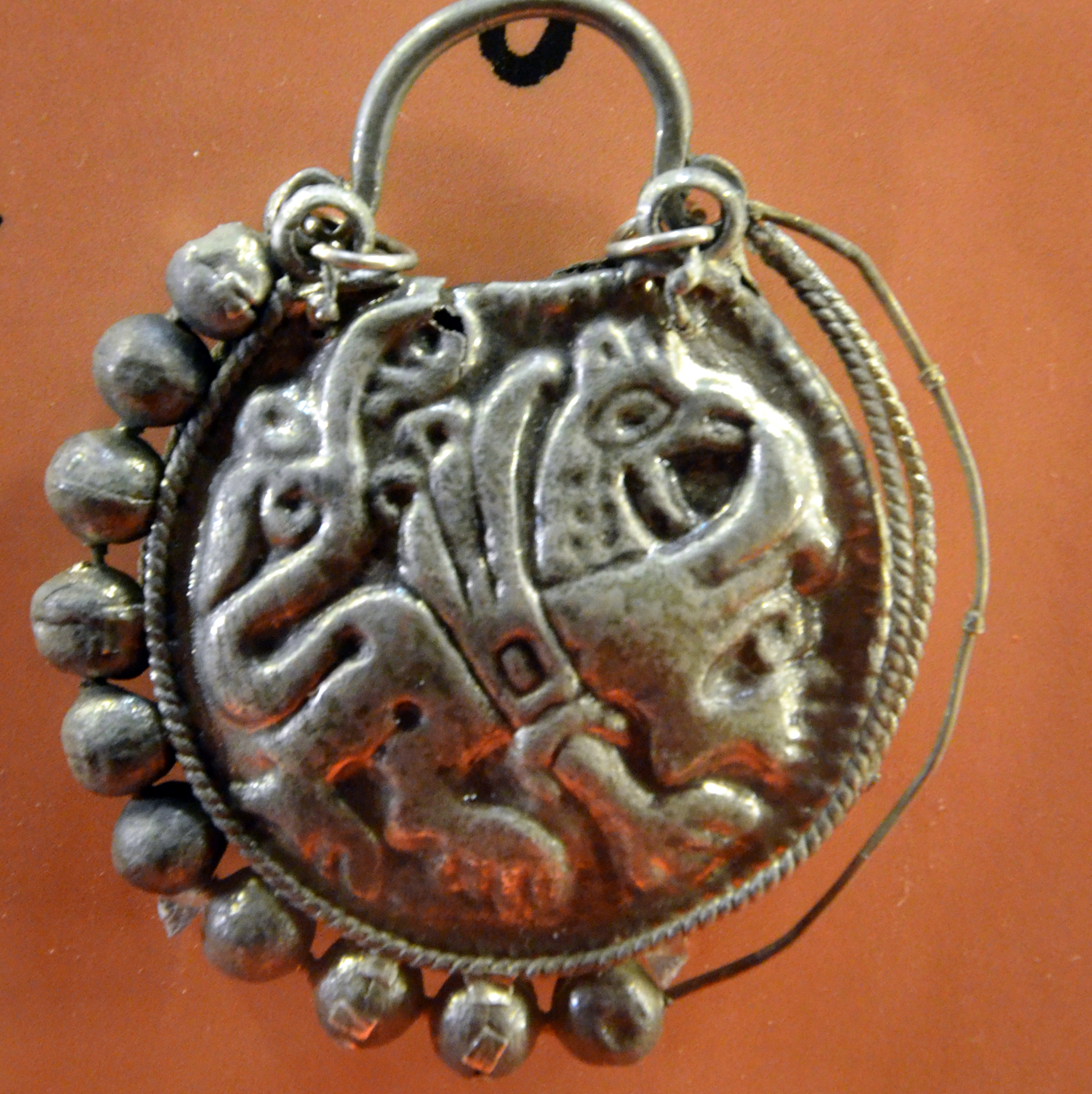
A 12th century earring found in Sanok

The first traces of settlement in the area of modern Sanok date back to at least the 9th century. The following century a Slavic fortified town (gord) was created there and initially served as a center of pagan worship. The etymology of the name is unclear, though most scholars derive it from the Celtic river-name San. Certain archaeological excavations performed on the castle hill and on Fajka hill near Sanok-Trepcza, not only confirm the written resources, but date the Sanok stronghold origin to as early as the 9th century. On Fajka hill, where probably the first settlement of Sanok was situated, some remains of an ancient sanctuary and a cemetery were found, as well as numerous decorations and encolpions in Kievan type. Also found were two seals of the Great Kievan Prince Rurik Rostislavich from the second half of the 12th century.

== Sights ==
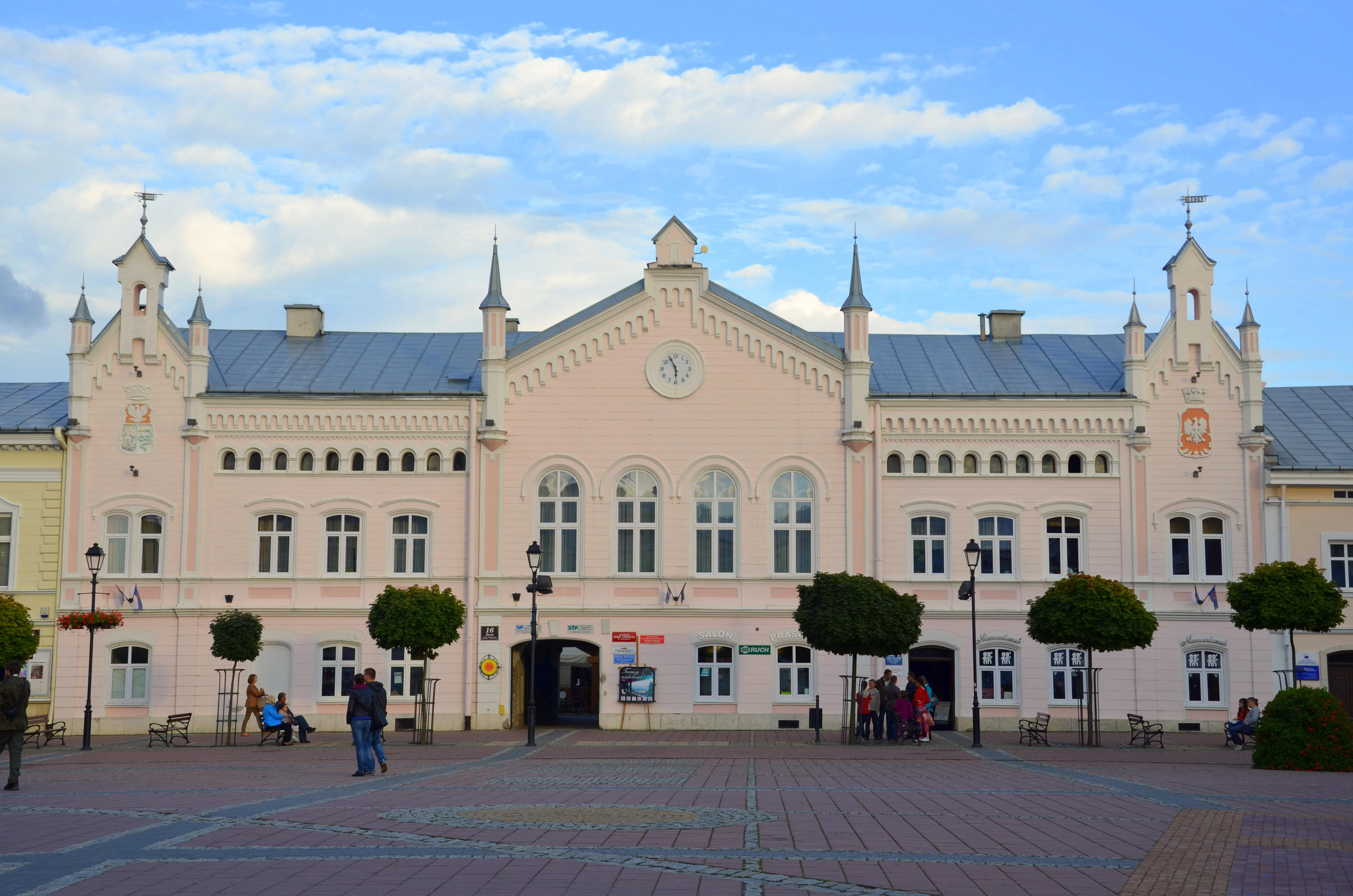
Neogothic town hall

- Skansen in Sanok - detailed houses, churches, cerkiews (Orthodox/Uniate churches of Lemkos, Boykos etc.)
- Sanok castle and Icon collection - one of the largest collections of this in Central and Eastern Europe.
- Town square/Rynek
- Parish Church dating to the 19th century
- Franciscan Church dating to the 14th century.

Near the central town square and the previous Jewish ghetto, there is a valley where much of the Jewish population was murdered en masse by the Nazis during the Holocaust.

== Economy ==
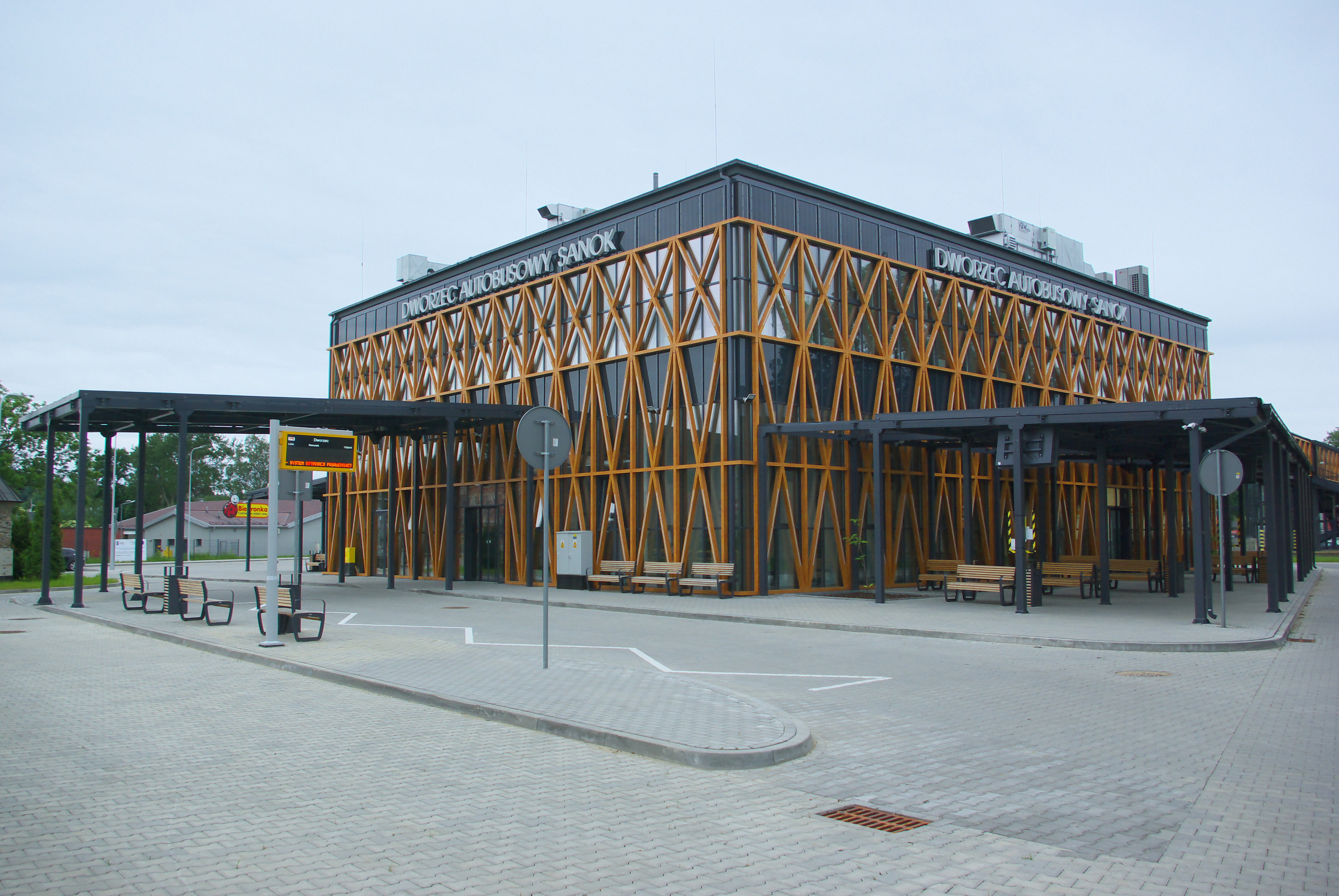
Sanok bus station

Sanok has a strong industry base - home to Stomil Sanok (established in 1932) and Pass Gummiwerke plants, producers of various rubber and metal-rubber seals, strings and laggings for automotive sector, construction industries and electrical household goods sector, PGNiG and Sanok Bus Car Factory "Autosan" (established in 1832), a producer of high capacity buses, cabins for the Polish Army and bodies for rail-vehicles. Stomil is next to the main train station in Sanok and Autosan is a 10-minute walk from the station, while the town centre is a 15-minute walk in the other direction.

== Culture and education ==
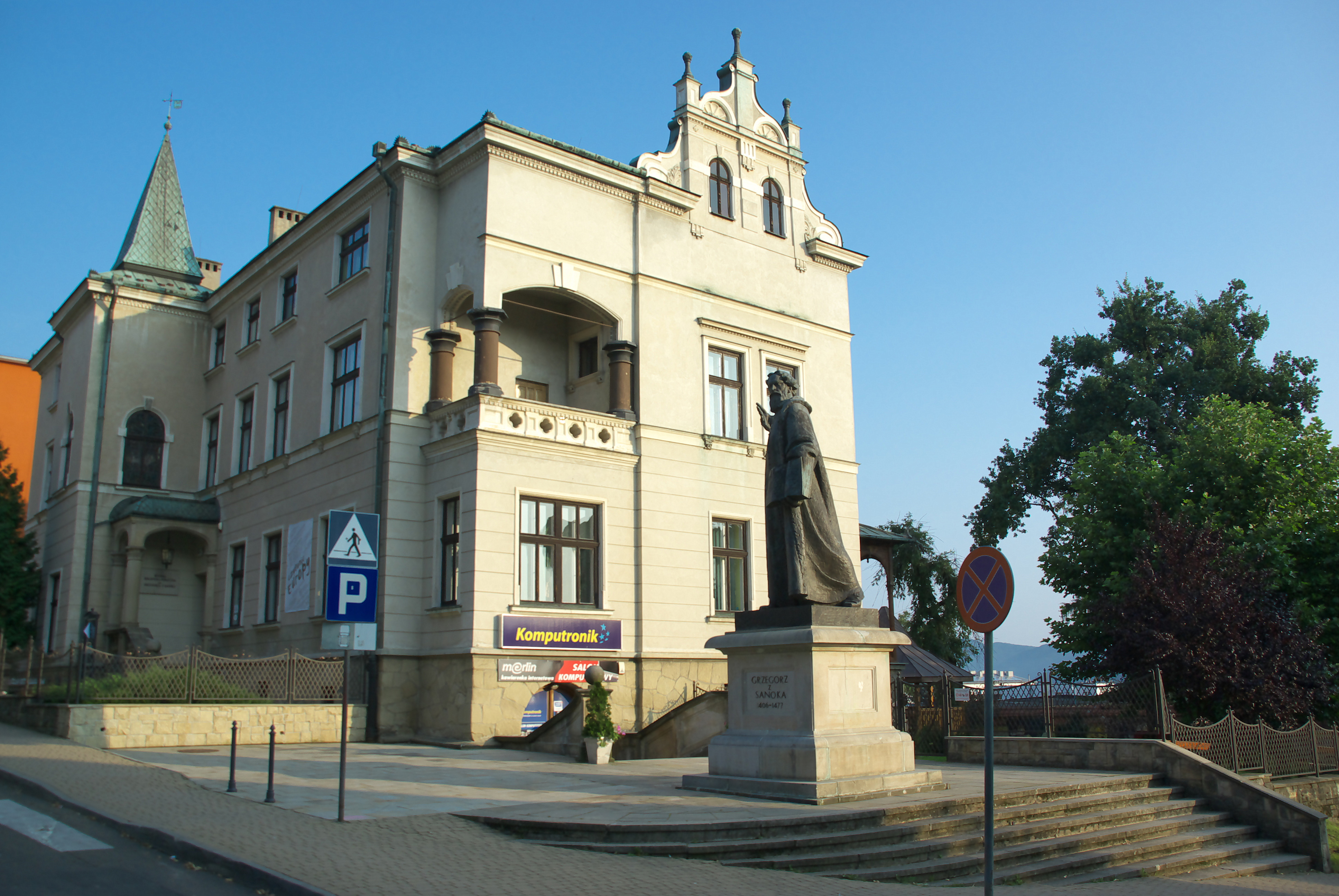
Library and the Grzegorz of Sanok Monument

The town has several public schools and a branch of the Polish High School of Technology. The town also has a football club called Stal Sanok and some other sport clubs (including volleyball, swimming, handball, ice hockey). The Sanok Castle near the centre of the old town houses a museum displaying over 300 fine icons. The Museum of Folk Architecture is one of the biggest open-air museums in Poland and show cases 19th and early 20th century life in this area of Poland.

== Sport ==
The city has two professional sports teams. The local ice hockey team is STS Sanok, which has won the Polska Hokej Liga league title twice, in the 2011/2012 and 2013/2014 season. They won the Polish Cup twice, in 2010-11 and 2011–12. The local football club is Stal Sanok, which competes in the lower leagues.

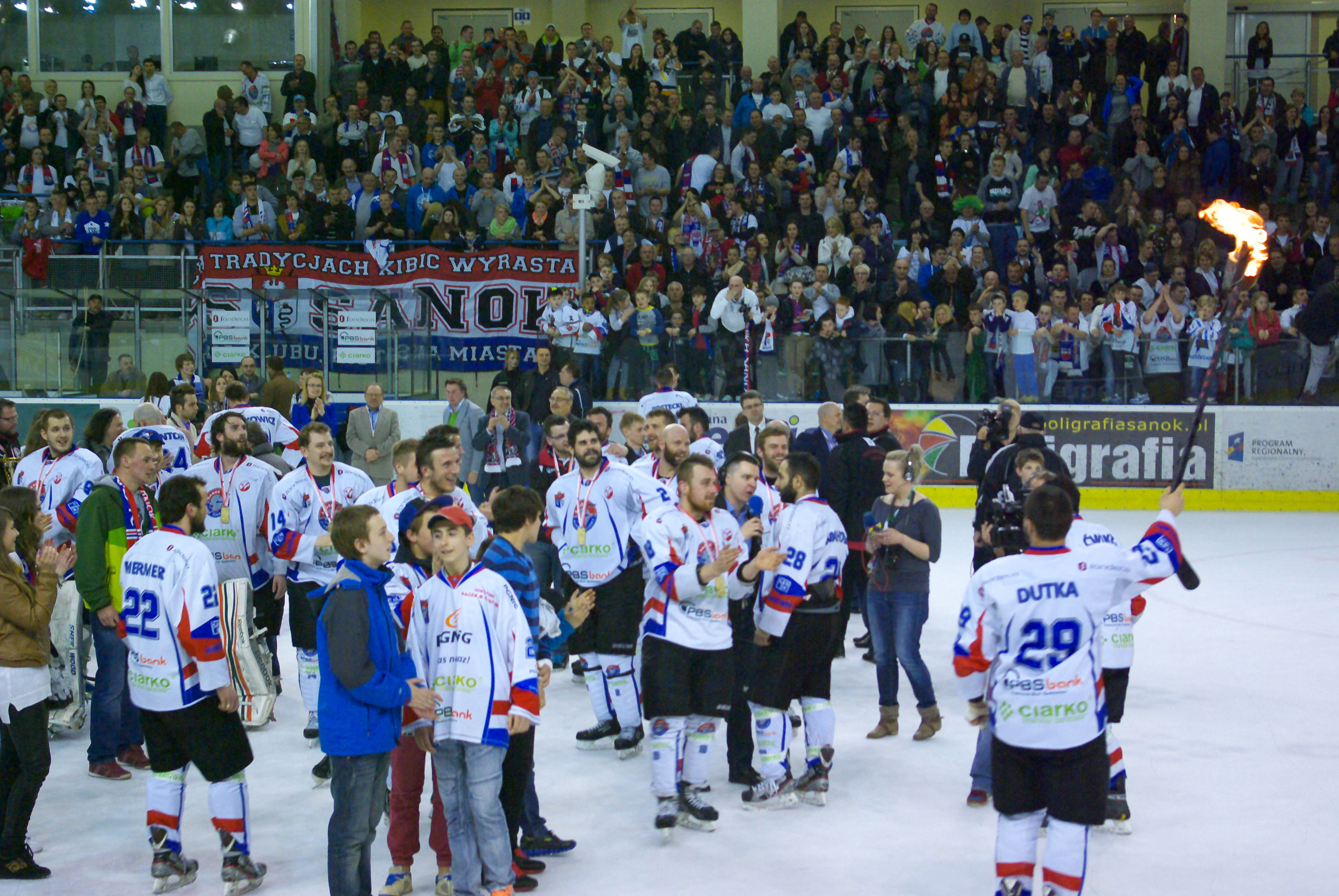
STS Sanok celebrating the Polish championship in 2014

There many sports facilities in Sanok and the main complex of those facilities is The Civic Sports and Recreation Centre, situated near the San River. The Centre includes: the artificial speed skating oval Tor Błonie, a complex of indoor and outdoor swimming pools, a hotel, a tourist hostel, a camp-site, a sports stadium with technical facilities, etc. There is also another artificial ice rink in the centre of the town, designed for ice hockey and managed by the ice hockey club STS Sanok. There are two more sports facilities at Stróżowska street: a stadium of sports club Stal Sanok, and a gymnasium of the Technical Schools Complex.

In winter, a ski-lift operates in the nearby Karlików.

== Notable people ==
- Katarzyna Bachleda-Curuś (born 1980), speed skater
- Tomasz Beksiński (1958–1999), radio presenter
- Zdzisław Beksiński (1929–2005), painter, photographer, sculptor
- Rena Bernstein (born 1938), only child survivor of 30,000 Jews in South Eastern Poland
- Adam Fastnacht (1913–1987), Polish historian
- Jan Grodek (?–1554), nine-time rector of Jagiellonian University
- Szlomo Halberstam (1847–1905), first Bobover Rebbe
- Mikołaj Kamieniecki(1460–1515), nobleman
- Juliusz Kühl (1913–1985), Polish diplomat
- Piotr Michalski (born 1994), speed skater
- Jerzy Mniszech (c. 1548–1613), nobleman
- Ryszard Pacławski (born 1958), lawyer
- Marian Pankowski (1919–2011), resistance fighter of World War II
- Zdzisław Peszkowski (1918–2007), survivor of the Katyn massacre
- Karol Pollak (1859–1928), electrical engineer, inventor and businessman
- Witold Przybyło, former mayor and deputy mayor
- Majer Szapira (1887–1933), first Orthodox Jew to become a member in the Sejm (Parliament)
- Janusz Szuber (1947–2020), poet, author and journalist
- Kazimierz Świtalski (1886–1962), politician and diplomat
- Tadeusz Vetulani (1897–1952), agriculturalist and biologist
- Frank-Wojnarowski (1921–1966), American Polish Orchestra leader
- Shalom Kramer (1912 - 1978), Israeli essayist, editor and literary critic
- Józef Lichtenberg (1914-1943), A teacher

https://victims.auschwitz.org/transports/627

== Demographics ==
Census population and average annual growth rate
| Year | Pop. | ±% p.a. |
|---|---|---|
| 1589 | 1,700 | — |
| 1880 | 5,121 | +0.38% |
| 1890 | 5,559 | +0.82% |
| 1900 | 6,365 | +1.36% |
| 1931 | 14,262 | +2.64% |
| 1939 | 17,862 | +2.85% |
| 1950 | 11,491 | −3.93% |
| 1960 | 17,141 | +4.08% |
| 2000 | 41,401 | +2.23% |

In the mid-18th century, Roman Catholics constituted 48.7% of the population, people of Jewish faith 36.5%, and 14.7% of the inhabitants belonged to the Greek Catholic Church.

In 1900, the town had 6123 inhabitants, 57% Polish, 30% Jewish, and the remainder of various Rusyn ethnicities (Boyko, Lemkos, etc.), and others. The town's large population of Jews were almost all murdered during the Holocaust.

Ethnic Groups

- Poles

== See also ==
- Folk Dance Ensemble Sanok
- Petroleum Trail
- Monuments and memorial sites in Sanok
