= Monuments and memorial sites in Sanok =

List of monuments, memorials, and commemorative plaques in Sanok, Poland

The monuments and memorial sites in Sanok are memorial sites, statues, sculptures, and commemorative plaques dedicated to people or events significant to the history of the city and Poland.

== Monuments ==
=== Existing monuments ===
- Tadeusz Kościuszko Monument, commemorating Tadeusz Kościuszko. It is located in the city centre on Tadeusz Kościuszko Street, on the southern slope of Parkowa Hill and at the entrance to the Adam Mickiewicz Park. It was designed by Józef Marek and Józef Wajda in 1958. The unveiling took place on 15 September 1962.
- An obelisk topped with a sculpture of an eagle commemorating 125 officers and soldiers of the Border Protection Forces who died between 1945 and 1947 in battles with the Ukrainian Insurgent Army. It is located below the building of the Sanok Cultural Centre at 24 Adam Mickiewicz Street. On the pedestal is a design with the inscription: "XV. In defence of the borders of the Polish People's Republic. WOP. Above, on a vertical plaque, is the inscription: "To the heroic soldiers of the Border Protection Forces who fell fighting UPA bands, and below are the names of the fallen, listed by year – 1945, 1946, and 1947 – with the signature at the bottom: The People of the Subcarpathian Region, year 1945–1960". The monument was unveiled on 11 June 1960, on the 15th anniversary of the battles and on the occasion of the 15th anniversary of the Border Protection Forces. The design was created by Edmund Królicki.
- Monument commemorating Poles who were victims of the German occupation between 1942 and 1944. It is located on Przemyska Street in the Olchowce district, next to the Orthodox Church of the Ascension. It commemorates around 40 Poles who were executed by the Germans in Olchowce between 1942 and 1944. The inscription reads: "A place sanctified by the blood of Poles murdered by Nazi executioners in the years 1942–1944. The People of the City of Sanok, 1974". The monument was built as a community effort, unveiled on 20 July 1975, and designed by Wojciech Kurpik. The initiative came from the Sanok branch of the Society of Fighters for Freedom and Democracy.
- A monument commemorating the soldiers of the 6th Pomeranian Infantry Division of the First Polish Army. It is located on John Paul II Street next to Primary School No. 9 (from 1975 to 1999, Primary School No. 7) in the Wójtostwo district. It consists of two plaques mounted on three tall vertical supports. The first plaque is gold – in its upper section are military insignia and images of three soldiers, along with the inscription: "To the sons of the Sanok Land who fell on the field of glory in the ranks of the 6th Pomeranian Infantry Division, First Polish Army, in the battles for Warsaw, the Pomeranian Wall, Kołobrzeg, the crossing of the Oder, and Berlin. Comrades-in-arms, school youth, teachers, parents. Sanok, 9 May 1976". The second plaque, below at the base of the monument, bears the inscription: Sons of the Sanok Land of the 1st and 2nd Polish Armies who fell for the freedom of the homeland in the years 1943–1945, followed by a list of 75 fallen soldiers' names and a signature at the bottom: "To Poland we gave our lives, to the Homeland our bodies, and faith to future generations. Union of Veterans of the Republic of Poland and Former Political Prisoners, Sanok branch. Nowak". The monument was unveiled during the Victory in Europe Day celebrations on 9 May 1976. The initiative to establish the monument came from Marian Jarosz. The plaque was designed by Assoc. Prof. Józef Galica, and it was manufactured by the Factory of Drilling Machines and Equipment in Gorlice. During a ceremony on 15 May 1994, the monument was consecrated by Father Adam Sudoł.
- Gregory of Sanok Monument, commemorating Gregory of Sanok. It is located in front of the building at 2 Teofil Lenartowicz Street, at the intersection with John III Sobieski Street (originally a house belonging to Wilhelm Szomek, now housing the Gregory of Sanok Municipal Public Library). The initiator of the monument was Władysław Harajda, the then-director of the library. It was designed by Marian Konieczny and executed by the Gliwice Technical Equipment Works company in 1985. The monument was unveiled on 27 April 1986 during the Sanok Days.
- Zdzisław Beksiński Monument commemorates the painter and native of Sanok, Zdzisław Beksiński (1929–2005). It is located in the Market Square, in front of the building façade at 14 Rynek Street. The sculpture was created by Adam Przybysz and unveiled on 19 May 2012. The bronze figure has 180 cm and weighs 200 kg.
- Monument of Saint Zygmunt Gorazdowski. It is located by the Church of Christ the King. It depicts Father Zygmunt Gorazdowski standing and bending toward a seated woman holding a child in her arms. The inscription on the pedestal reads: "Patron of the City of Sanok, Saint Father Zygmunt Gorazdowski. 1845 Sanok – 1920 Lviv". It was created by Marek Maślaniec and Agnieszka Świerzowicz, and funded through public donations. It was unveiled on 30 October 2010.
- John Paul II Monument, located by the Church of the Transfiguration, was initiated and funded by Father Adam Sudoł. The monument was unveiled in June 2011. The creators were Marek Maślaniec and Agnieszka Świerzowicz.
- Monument of anchors, commemorating the launching of the sea vessel MS Sanok, which took place on 13 May 1966. The general cargo ship was built at the Aalborg shipyard (Denmark) and handed over to the Polish Ocean Lines on 13 September 1966; it was sold in 1987. The monument was initiated by Maria Styrkosz. It consists of two iron anchors mounted on a pedestal made of stone blocks shaped as cubes. The anchors were donated by Michał Ziółkowski of the company Hartwig. The monument was unveiled a few months after the ship's launching and is located at the Square of Partner Cities. The inscription on the monument reads: "In memory of the launching of the ship M/S Sanok 13.09.1966".
- Tank monument, located on Białogórska Street in the Wójtostwo district, near the bridge over the San river connecting left-bank Sanok with Biała Góra, at the site where the German-Soviet border was established on 17 September 1939. The monument consists of a T-34-85 tank and was unveiled as part of preserving the traditions of the 26th Infantry Regiment during the Armed Forces Day on 12 October 1982, commemorating the 39th anniversary of the founding of the Polish People's Army and the 38th anniversary of the Battle of Lenino. It was intended to commemorate the military engagements of the Polish Army against German forces, the Ukrainian Insurgent Army, and post-war resistance groups.
- Monument of Saint Michael the Archangel, unveiled on 17 November 2018 at St. Michael's Square, and consecrated on the same day by Archbishop Adam Szal. The sculpture, designed by Agnieszka Świerzowicz-Maślaniec and Marek Maślaniec, was cast in bronze and has 5 meters in total height, including the pedestal. The architectural installation was overseen by architect Mariola Sidor. The shield of Archangel Michael bears the Latin inscription: "Quis ut Deus" ("Who is like God").
- Monument commemorating the victims of German concentration camps on the 80th anniversary of the death of Saint Maximilian Kolbe. It was unveiled on 15 August 2021 next to the Chapel of St. Maximilian Maria Kolbe.
- A statuette of Grześ of Sanok, placed on a stone, unveiled on 29 December 2023 in the Market Square.

=== Former monuments ===
- In connection with the celebrations of the 300th anniversary of the Union of Lublin, the Sanok City Council passed a resolution on 6 August 1869 that during the ceremony on 11 August 1869, the foundations for a monument would be laid and consecrated on Stróżnia Hill, on land owned by Ignacy Gądylowski, Ksawery Chmielowski, or Katarzyna Stopczyńska. According to another version, the monument, along with a commemorative plaque, was erected on 11 August 1869 at Mary Square (today Gregory of Sanok Street); the committee responsible for its construction included Jan Zarewicz, Karol Pollak, Szymon Drewiński, and Saul Pineles.
- The first Tadeusz Kościuszko Monument (1902–1941) was a sculpture designed by Julian Markowski, a sculptor from Lviv. The pedestal was designed by engineer Wilhelm Szomek, and the co-builder of the monument was the city architect, engineer Władysław Beksiński. The monument was unveiled on 28 September 1902 at St. John's Square. In April 1941, the monument was destroyed by the German forces.
- A now-nonexistent Memorial Monument, established during World War II under the German occupation in the Adam Mickiewicz Park area, commemorated the German attack on the Soviet Union. The inscription read: "Zur Erinnerung an den 22. Juni 1941 Festungs-Pionierstab 24 Vorm. Oberbaustab 33. 1940–1942". A dome from a Soviet bunker near Krzywula by Lesko was placed on the monument base. After the war, the metal letters forming the inscription were gradually removed. The monument was dismantled in 1957.
- The Monument of Gratitude to the Soldiers of the Red Army commemorated soldiers who died during World War II fighting for the liberation of Sanok. It was located at Harcerski Square, near the eastern entrance to the city park from Adam Mickiewicz Street. It was unveiled on 16 November 1977 to commemorate the liberation of Sanok by the Red Army on 3 August 1944. Previously, since autumn 1945, another monument commemorating the same event had stood in this location, followed by an obelisk from 1951 placed at the site of a small military grave. The 1977 monument was preceded by the exhumation of soldiers' remains, which were transferred to a newly established plot at the Central Cemetery. It was made from patinated copper sheets, based on a design by Jan Krug, Wojciech Frik, Andrzej Getter, and Józef Sokowski. It originally commemorated the burial site of Soviet soldiers who died in front-line battles in 1944. In 1990, the inscription directly referring to the Soviet state and the red star were removed, and the inscription on the pedestal was changed. It then read: "In memory of the soldiers who died fighting for the liberation of Sanok". On 15 September 2016, the monument was dismantled.
Monuments

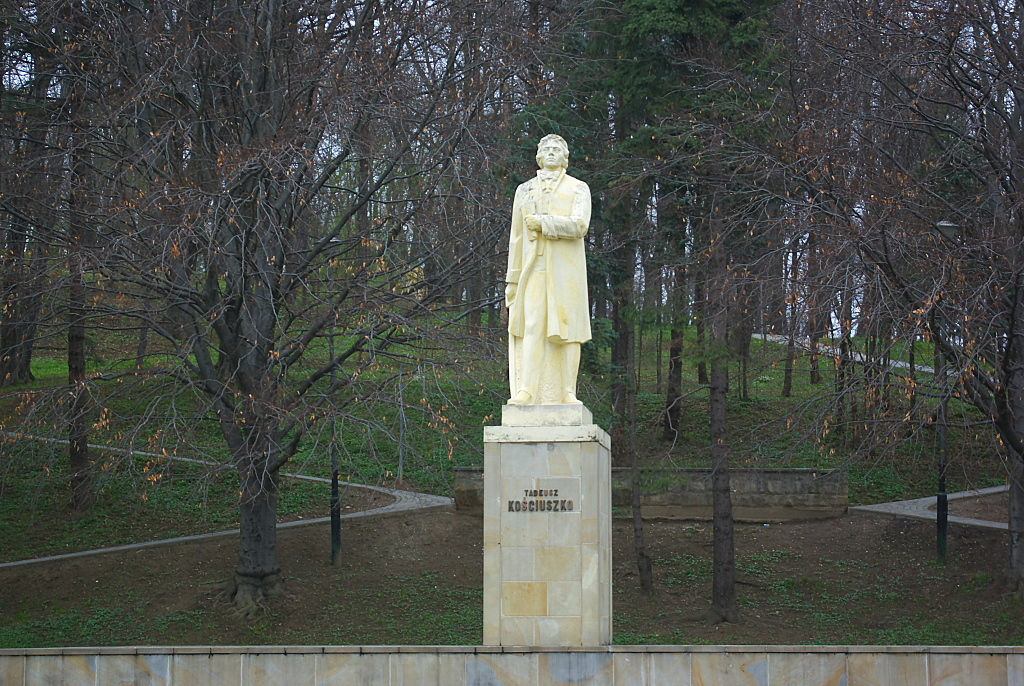
Tadeusz Kościuszko Monument

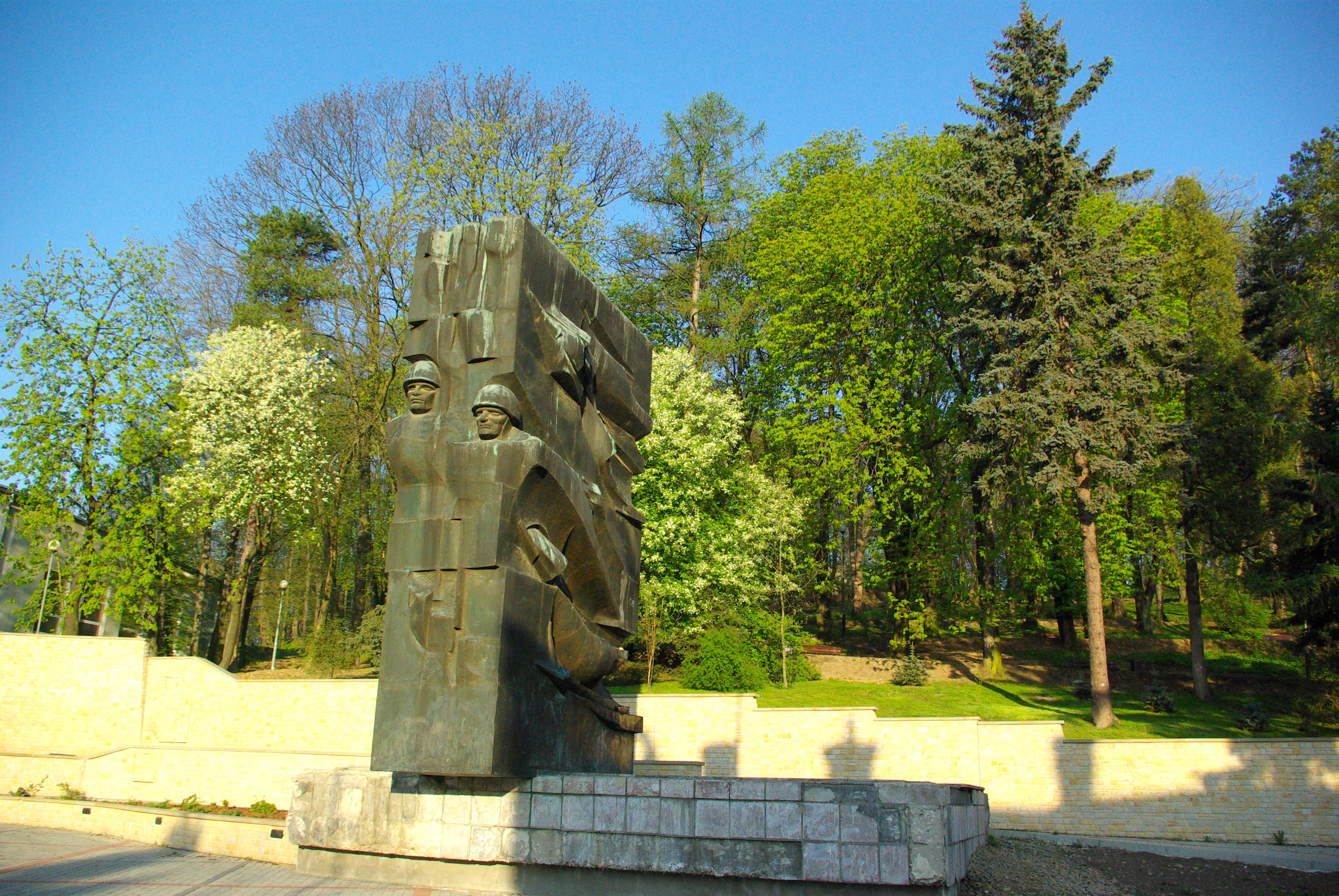
Monument of Gratitude

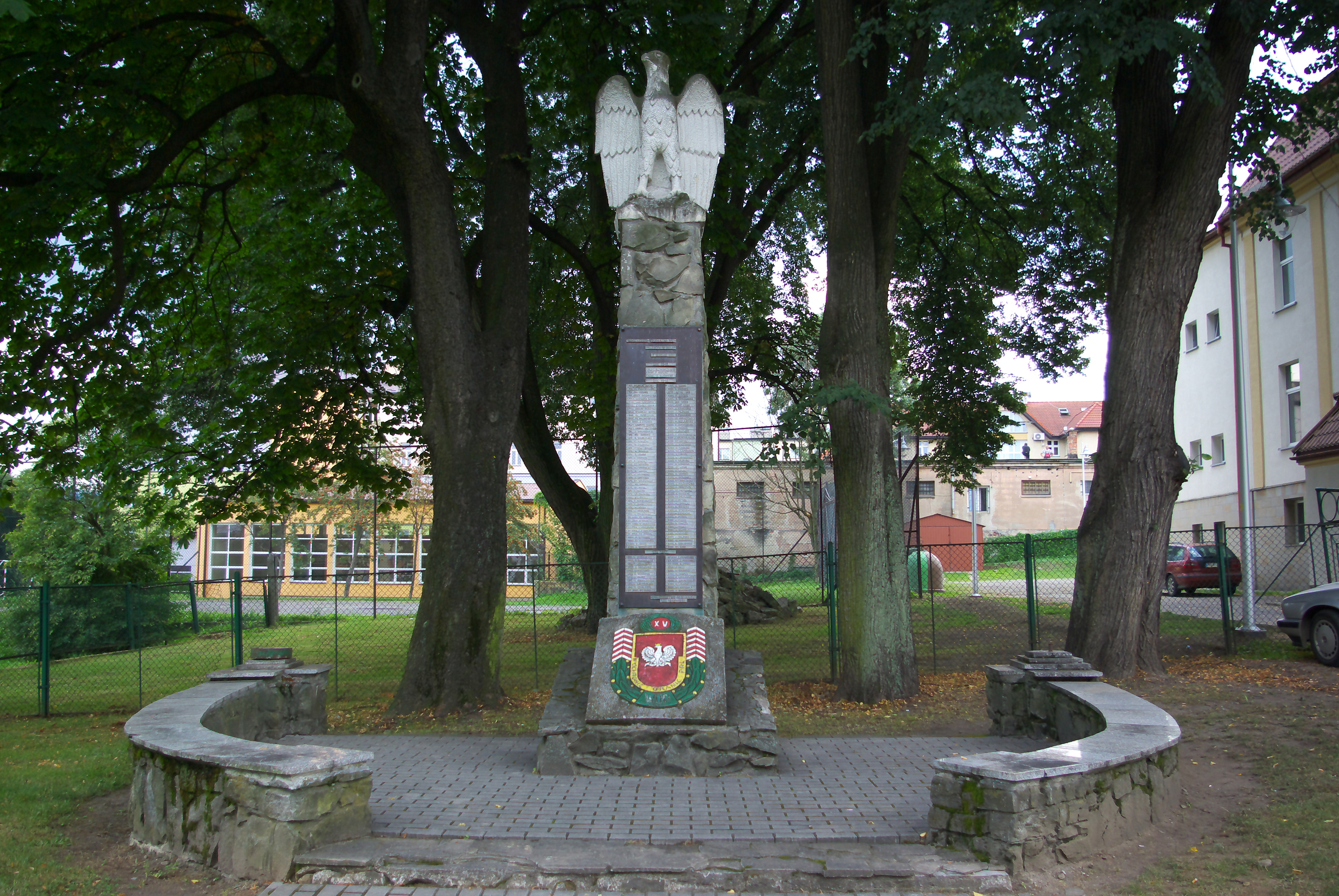
Monument to the Border Protection Forces soldiers who died in the fight against Ukrainian Insurgent Army

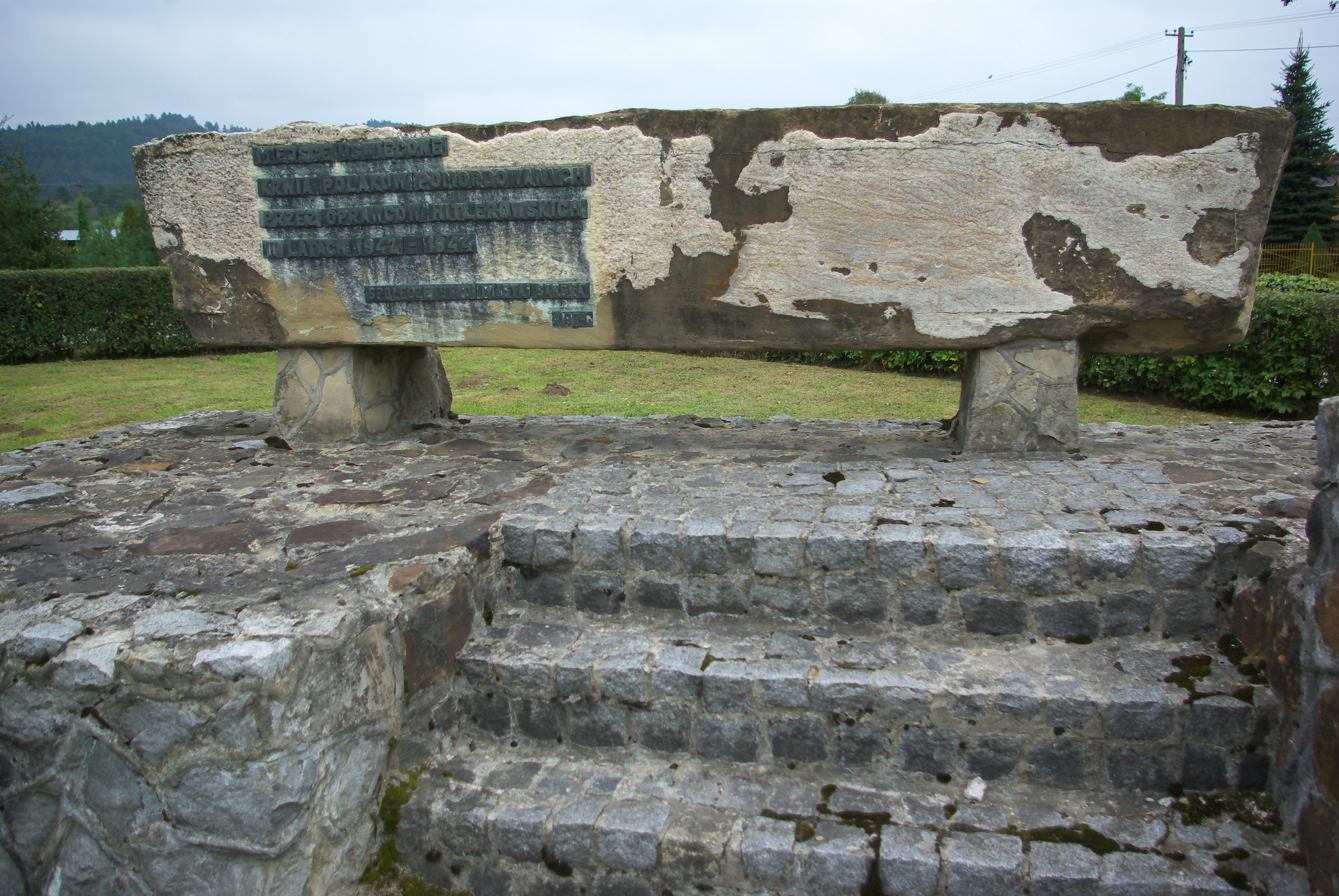
Monument to those who died between 1942 and 1944 in Olchowce

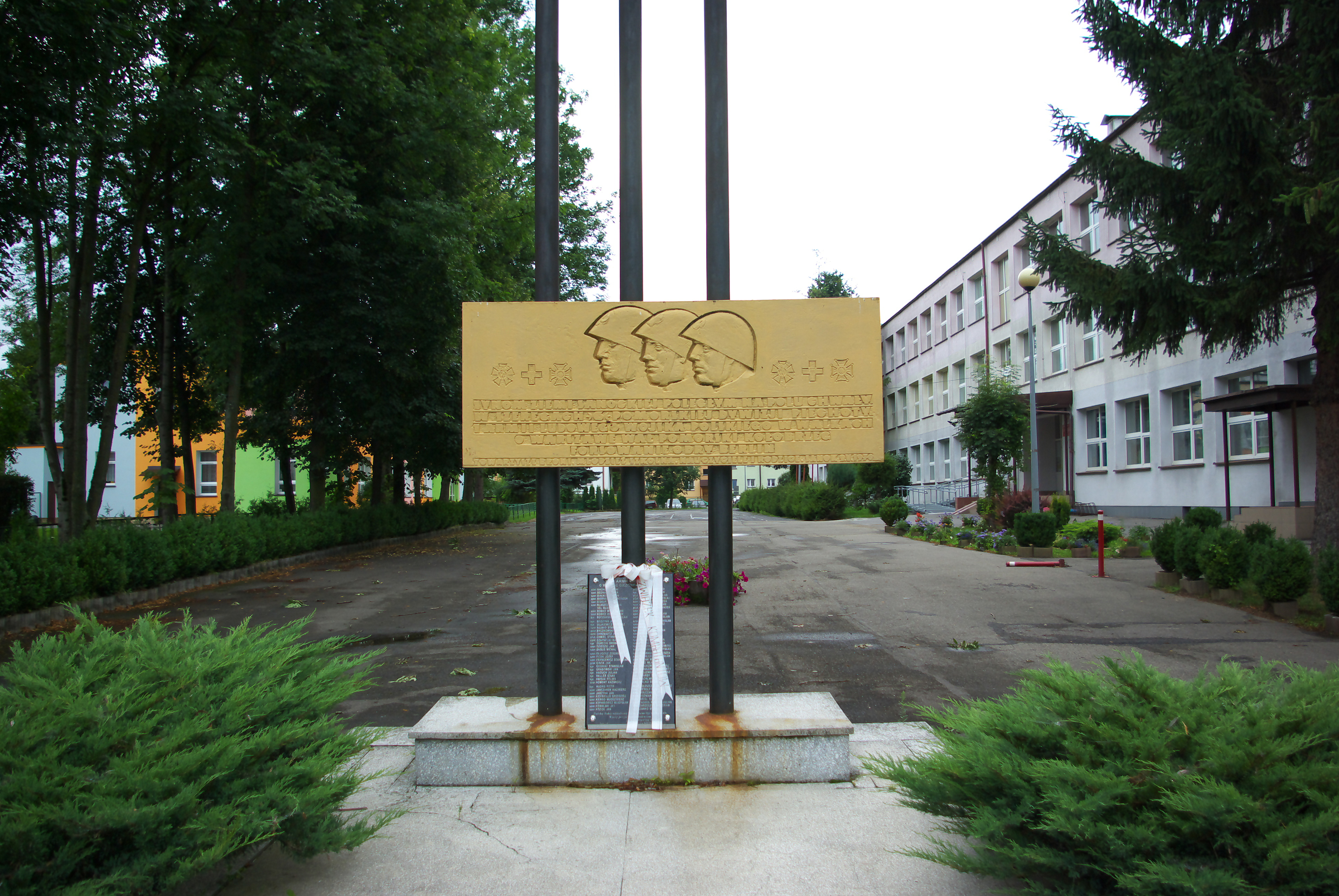
Monument to the Sons of the Sanok Land from the 6th Pomeranian Infantry Division

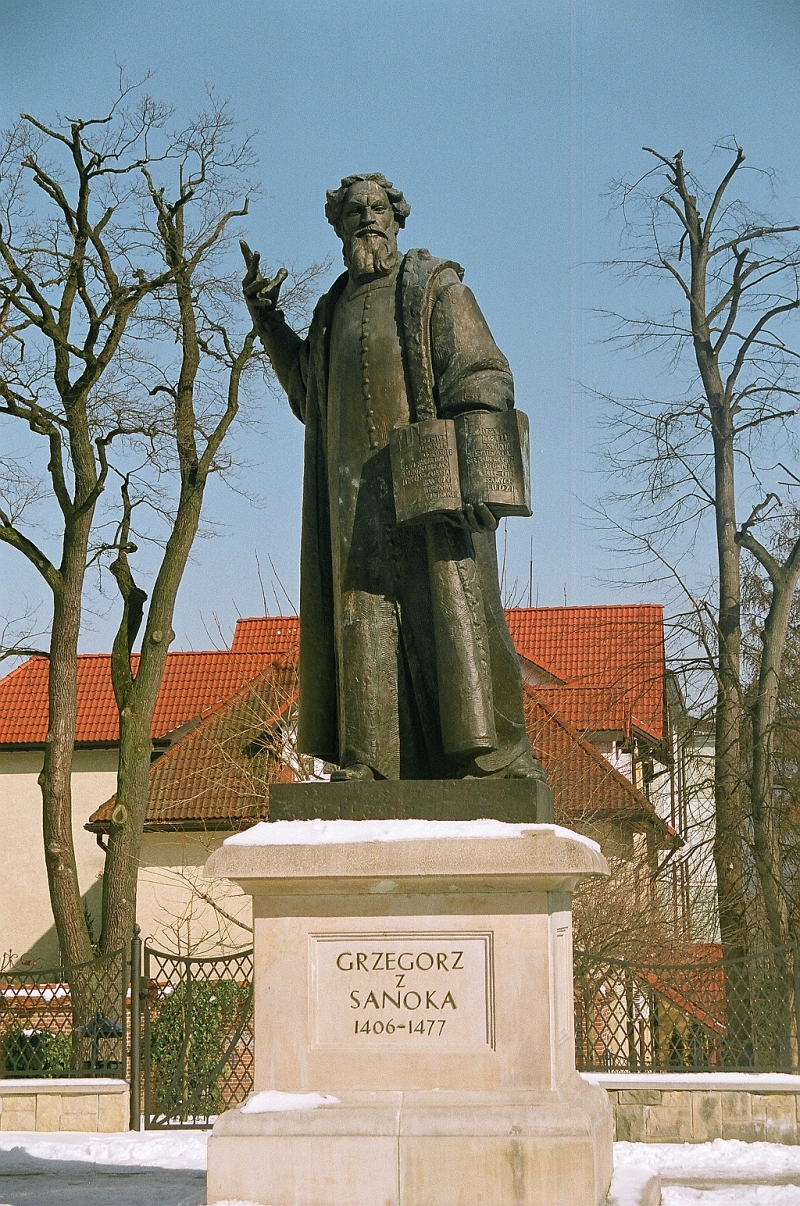
Gregory of Sanok Monument

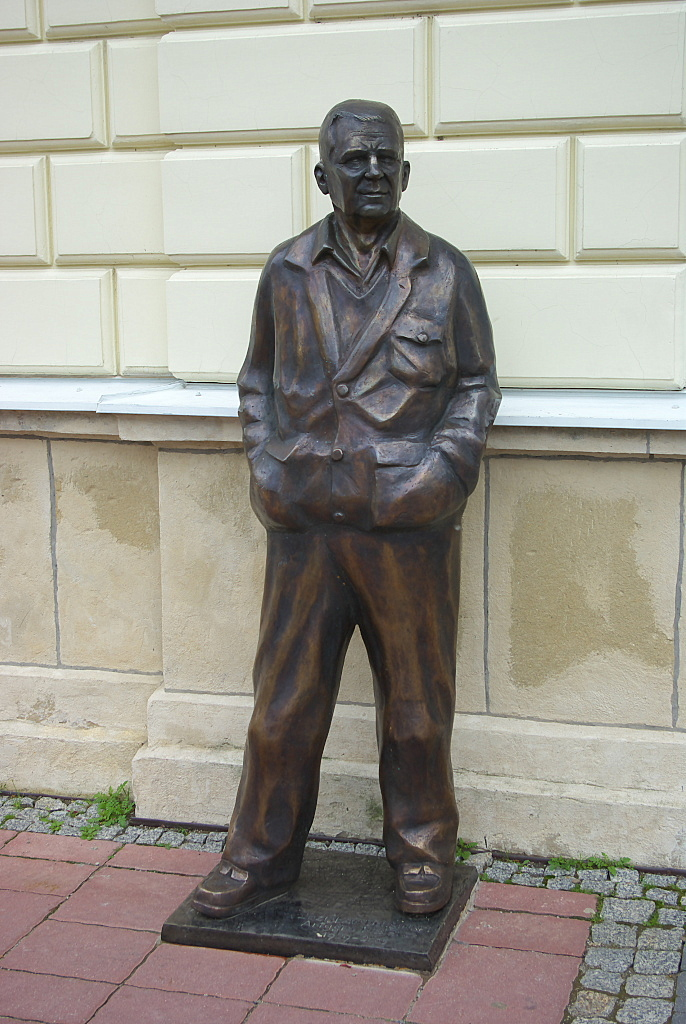
Zdzisław Beksiński Monument

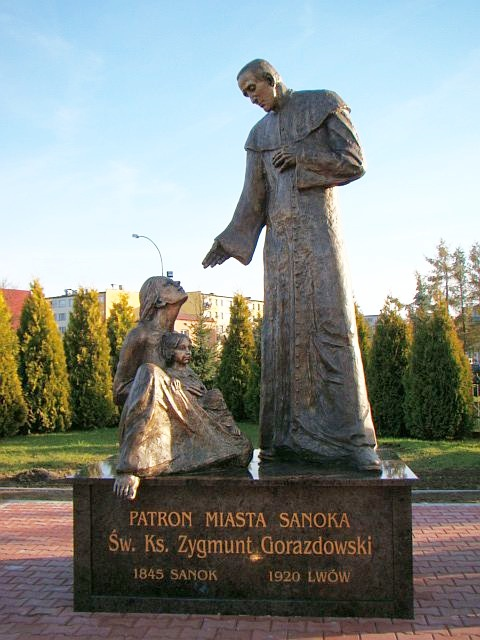
Statue of St. Zygmunt Gorazdowski

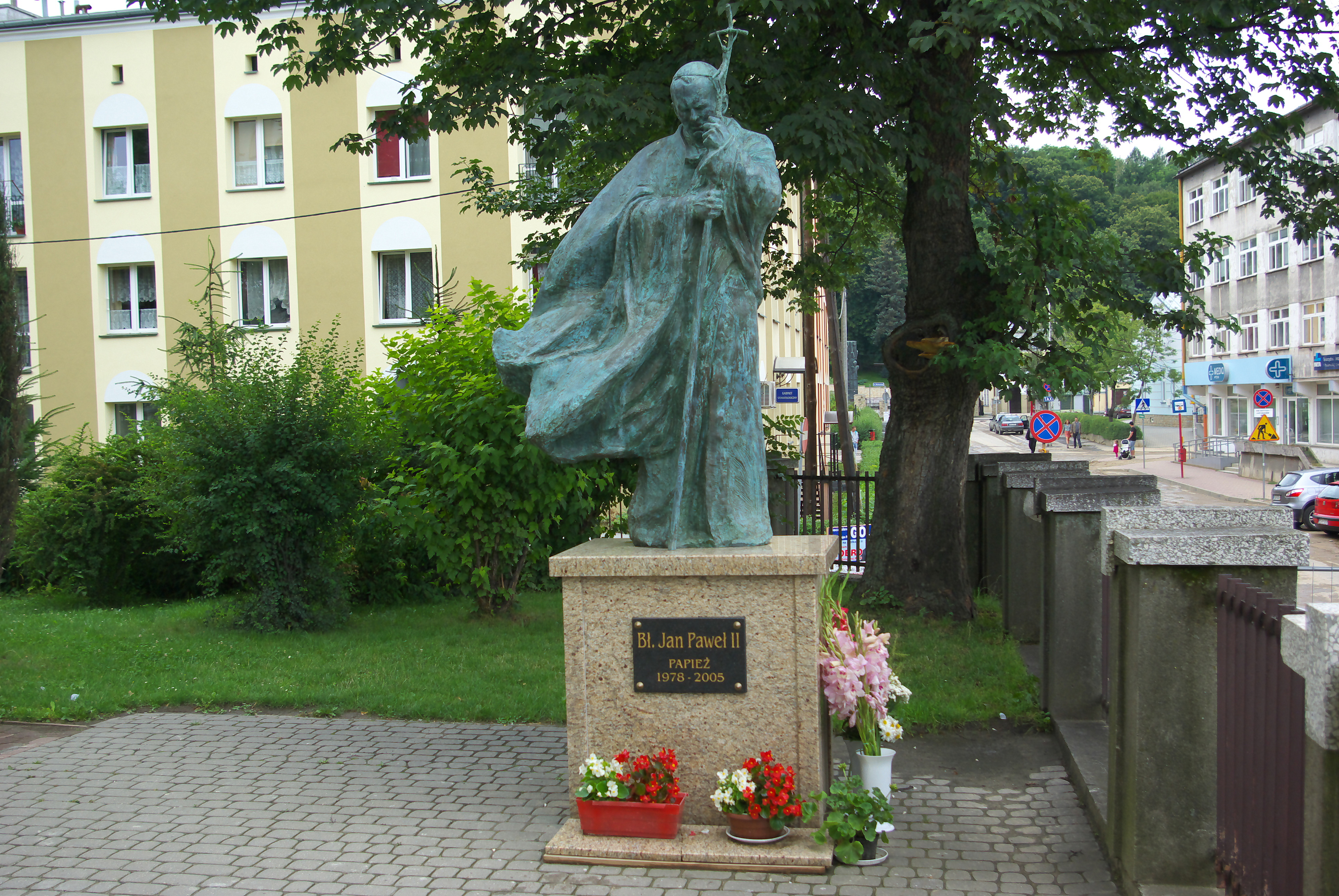
John Paul II Monument

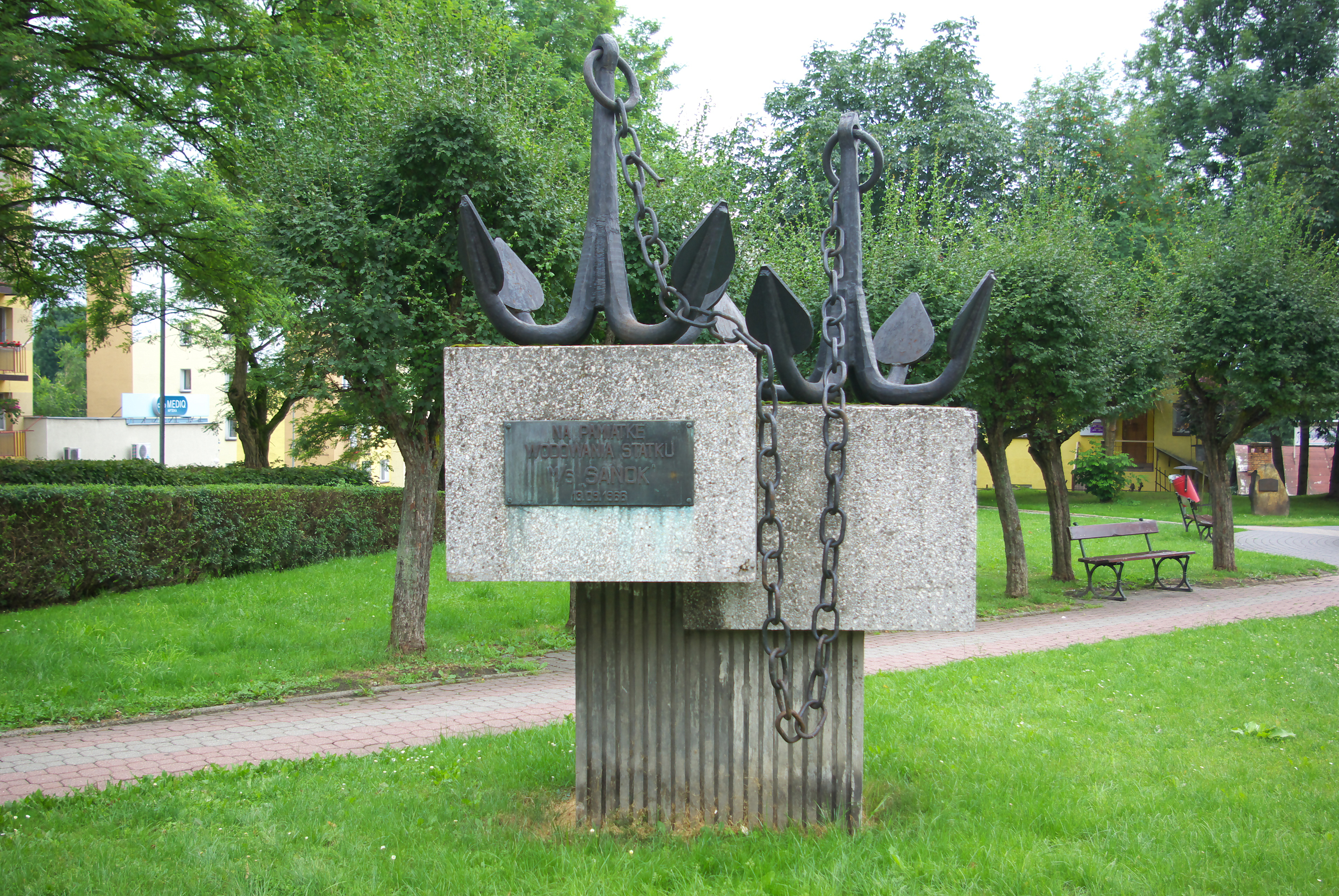
Monument of anchors

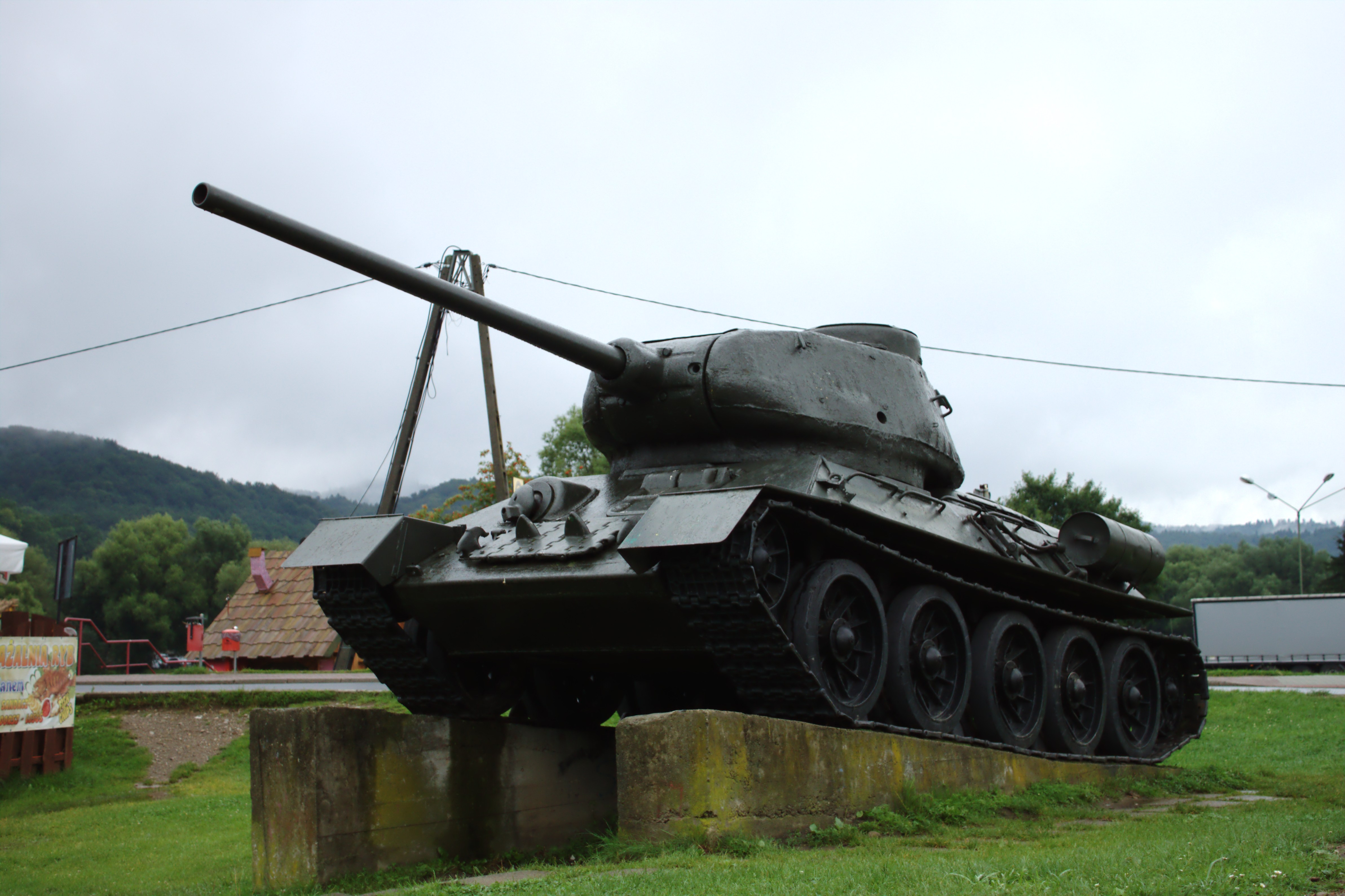
Tank monument

== Crosses ==
- The Insurgents Cross, located at the Central Cemetery on Rymanowska Street, is an oak cross erected in 1923 by Sanok scouts and students of the Queen Zofia State Gymnasium: Fritz Hotze, Józef Pohorski, Tadeusz Riedrich, and Zygmunt Żyłka-Żebracki, in commemoration of Polish independence uprisings. A plaque with the inscription "To the heroes of 1831/63 – Scouts 1923" was mounted on the cross; it was made at the Sanok Wagon Factory. Scouts used to take the Scout Promise at the foot of the cross, including, among others, Father Zdzisław Peszkowski. In 1980, a new stone base was added with a plaque bearing the inscription: "To the Heroes of the Polish Uprisings, 1980". On 11 November 1996, a new cross with a renovated metal plaque was consecrated, funded by the then Chief Scout of the Polish Scouting and Guiding Association, Ryszard Pacławski. The plaque is now mounted at the intersection of the two beams of the cross and reads: "To the heroes of 1831 63 – Scouts 1923 1996". Additionally, on the vertical wooden part of the cross, there is a plaque reading: "Ernest Bauman, insurgent of 1831, Knight of the Virtuti Militari, former officer of the Poznań cavalry regiment".
- Crosses commemorating the deaths of several dozen people (approximately 70) resulting from an explosion of flammable materials at the Sanok Rubber Company on 2 August 1944. Additional memorials were placed at the intersection of Dworcowa Street and Mateusz Beksiński Street:
  - The first, established around the late 1950s to early 1960s, was made and funded by the blacksmith Andrzej Bar. A weeping willow was planted nearby by Józef Baszak.
  - The second, a metal cross with a commemorative plaque, was erected in 1994 on the initiative of the senior club Sanoczanie with support from residents of the Posada district and its council. The inscription reads: "The cross was erected to commemorate several dozen people who tragically died in flames like living torches – as a result of an explosion of flammable materials at the Rubber Factory on 2 August 1944. Their memory will remain alive in our hearts. Residents of the Posada District".
  - The third, a monument in the form of a cross with a plaque, was unveiled before the 70th anniversary of the event, on 14 June 2014. It consists of a granite monument with a cross surrounded by flames, set on sandstone rocks. The inscription reads: "...love and memory stronger than death... In honor of the memory of several dozen victims – residents of Sanok and nearby towns who lost their lives in the tragic fire at the Rubber Factory in Sanok on 2 August 1944. On the 70th anniversary of the tragedy, we remember. The social committee for commemorating the victims of the 1944 tragedy Councilors of the Posada district, 5th term. Sanok, 14.06.2014".
- Monument to the Sons of the Sanok Land Who Fell and Were Murdered for Poland, located at St. John's Square, commemorates the residents of Sanok and the Sanok Land who died in battles during World War II, in German concentration camps, in the Katyn massacre, and in actions of the Ukrainian Insurgent Army. Its central element is a cross vertically split in half, placed on a slanted cobblestone pedestal. The main inscription reads: "To the Sons of the Sanok Land Who Fell and Were Murdered for Poland". On the left end is the coat of arms of Sanok, on the right end the coat of arms of Poland, and between them are 37 plaques recalling places of battles, martyrdom, and massacres beginning in 1939. On the left side there are 20 plaques: "Westerplatte-Hel 1939, Gdynia-Redłowo 1939, Kock 1939, Jurków-Koniecmosty 1939, Wilno 1939–1945, Warszawa 1939–1945, Lwów 1939–1945, Narvik 1940, Tobruk 1941, London 1940–1945, Falaise-Chamboise 1944, Auschwitz 1940–1945, Majdanek 1941–1944, Lenino 1943, Monte Cassino 1944, Arnhem 1944, Puławy-Dęblin 1944, Kołobrzeg 1945, Pomeranian Wall 1945, Berlin 1945". On the right side there are 17 plaques: "Sanok Sanok Land 1939–1944, Dachau 1940–1945, Buchenwald 1940–1945, Mauthausen 1940–1945, Flossenbürg 1940–1945, Neuengamme 1940–1945, Gross Rosen 1940–1945, Kozielsk Katyn 1940, Ostashkov Tver Mednoye 1940, Starobelsk Kharkiv 1940, Vorkuta 1940–1996, Gruszka near Tarnawa 1940, Bełżec 1941–1943, Treblinka 1941–1944, Volhynia 1942–1945, Baligród 1944–1948, Jasiel 1946". The initiative to construct the monument came from the Association Committee for the Construction of the Monument to the Sons of the Sanok Land Who Fell for Poland, led by Marian Jarosz. The monument was created by Jan Tutaj. It was unveiled on 11 November 2005, the 87th anniversary of Poland regaining independence.
- A granite monument in the form of a cross (the so-called "Cross of Atonement"), with a commemorative plaque at the Karol Adamiecki School Complex, commemorates Greek Catholic faithful buried on this site, where until the 19th century stood the Church of the Nativity of the Blessed Virgin Mary with a cemetery. The monument and plaque, designed by Władysław Pulnar, were unveiled on 18 June 2001 and blessed by Father Andrzej Skiba.
- Monument Golgotha of the East commemorates victims of the Katyn massacre from Sanok and the Sanok Land. It is located in the western part of the cemetery, next to the funeral home. The monument was created on the initiative of native Sanok resident, Father Zdzisław Peszkowski. Its central element is the Cross of Remembrance of the Victims of the Polish Golgotha of the East, consecrated on 10 November 2008. The birch cross bears a plaque reading: "To the victims of the Polish Golgotha of the East". At its base, stones bear three plaques. The first states: "The cross was erected on the initiative of Rev. Prelate Zdzisław J. Peszkowski through the efforts of the ZHP Sanok District. A.D. 2008.". The second reads: "In the 40th year, Mother, they sent us to Siberia. Sanok, 04.2009", funded by the Siberian Exiles Association. The third commemorates Lieutenant Zbigniew Czekański and contains a quote from Father Zdzisław Peszkowski along with information: "With heart and prayer I surround the figure of scout Z. Czekański, beloved scout, conspirator, hero, and martyr, Rev. Z. Peszkowski / Lieutenant Zbigniew Czekański born 4 July 1907 died 30 June 1941. Deputy commander of the scout troop in Sanok. Commander of the Scout Defense Company of Lwów in 1939. Instructor of the Lwów Banner of the Grey Ranks. Sanok, 18 April 2009". On 18 April 2009, as part of the action "Katyń... we remember" / "Katyń... Save from oblivion", 21 Oaks of Remembrance were planted in the so-called Katyń Alley around the cross, honoring victims of the Katyn massacre born in Sanok or connected to the city. On the second anniversary of Father Peszkowski's death, 8 October 2009, three more Oaks of Remembrance were planted, and on the fifth anniversary, 8 October 2012, two more. In total, 26 officers and officials were commemorated: Second Lieutenant Juliusz Bakoń, Second Lieutenant Zygmunt Bezucha, Major Józef Drzewiecki, Captain Jan Dulęba, Second Lieutenant Włodzimierz Dżugan, Chaplain Lieutenant Colonel Szymon Fedorońko, Major Tadeusz Florczak, Second Lieutenant Władysław Godula, Second Lieutenant Stanisław Hroboni, Second Lieutenant Bronisław Jahn, Lieutenant Edward Kilarski, Major Jan Józef Kosina, Corporal Stanisław Mazur, Lieutenant Stanisław Michalski, Second Lieutenant Władysław Miller, Colonel Stefan Mozołowski, Lieutenant Colonel Edward Peszkowski, Second Lieutenant Zbigniew Przystasz, Second Lieutenant Zdzisław Rajchel, Senior Postman Rudolf Ryndak, Lieutenant Tadeusz Słotołowicz, Lieutenant Colonel Stanisław Styrczula, Captain Franciszek Szafran, Captain Aleksander Ślączka, Second Lieutenant Ludwik Warchał, Lieutenant Józef Winter.
- A cross mounted on the eastern façade of the Church of the Transfiguration on Gregory of Sanok Street. The inscriptions at the top read: "Christ yesterday, today, and forever, and Holy Year 2000". Next to the cross are plaques bearing the names of places of martyrdom – Katyn, Kharkiv, Dachau, Miednoje, Auschwitz – commemorating the victims of the Katyn massacre. Below, a plaque reads: "To those who fell defending the faith, the church, and the homeland. To the residents of Sanok A.D. 1998". The cross was consecrated on the parish feast day, 6 August 1998.
Crosses

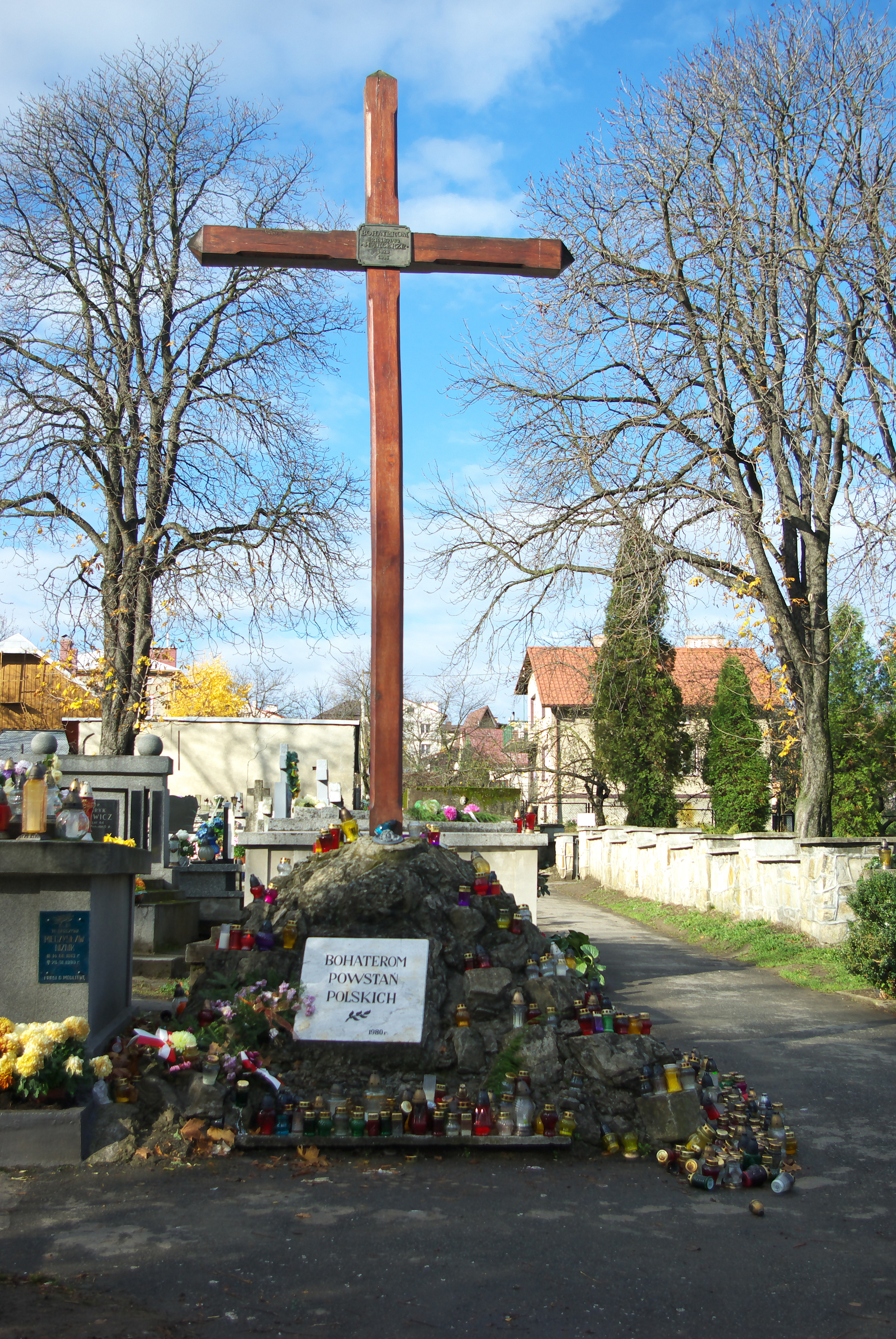
Insurgents Cross at the Central Cemetery

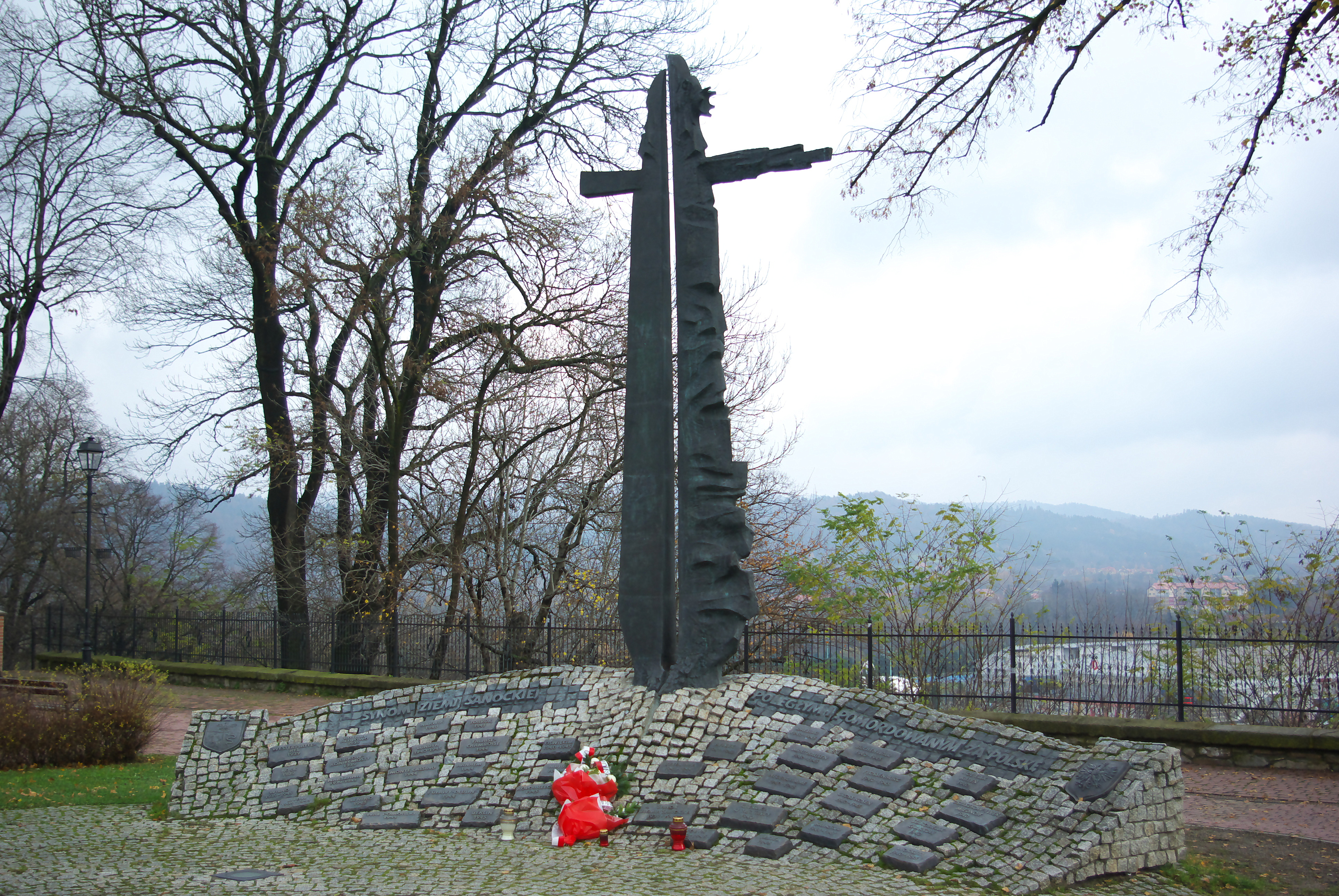
Monument to the Sons of the Sanok Land Who Fell and Were Murdered for Poland

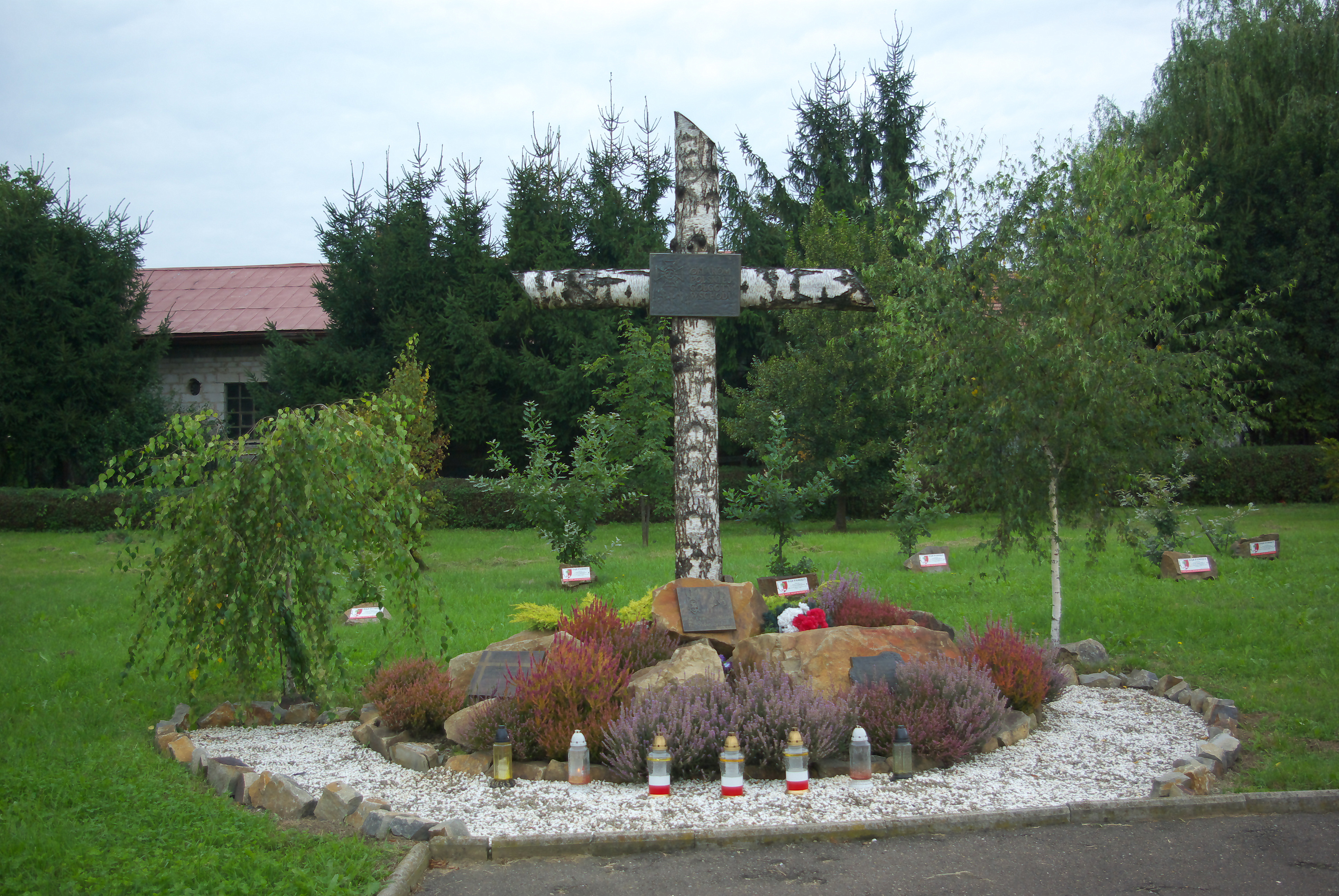
Monument Golgotha of the East at the Central Cemetery

== Graves, mausoleums and cemetery monuments ==
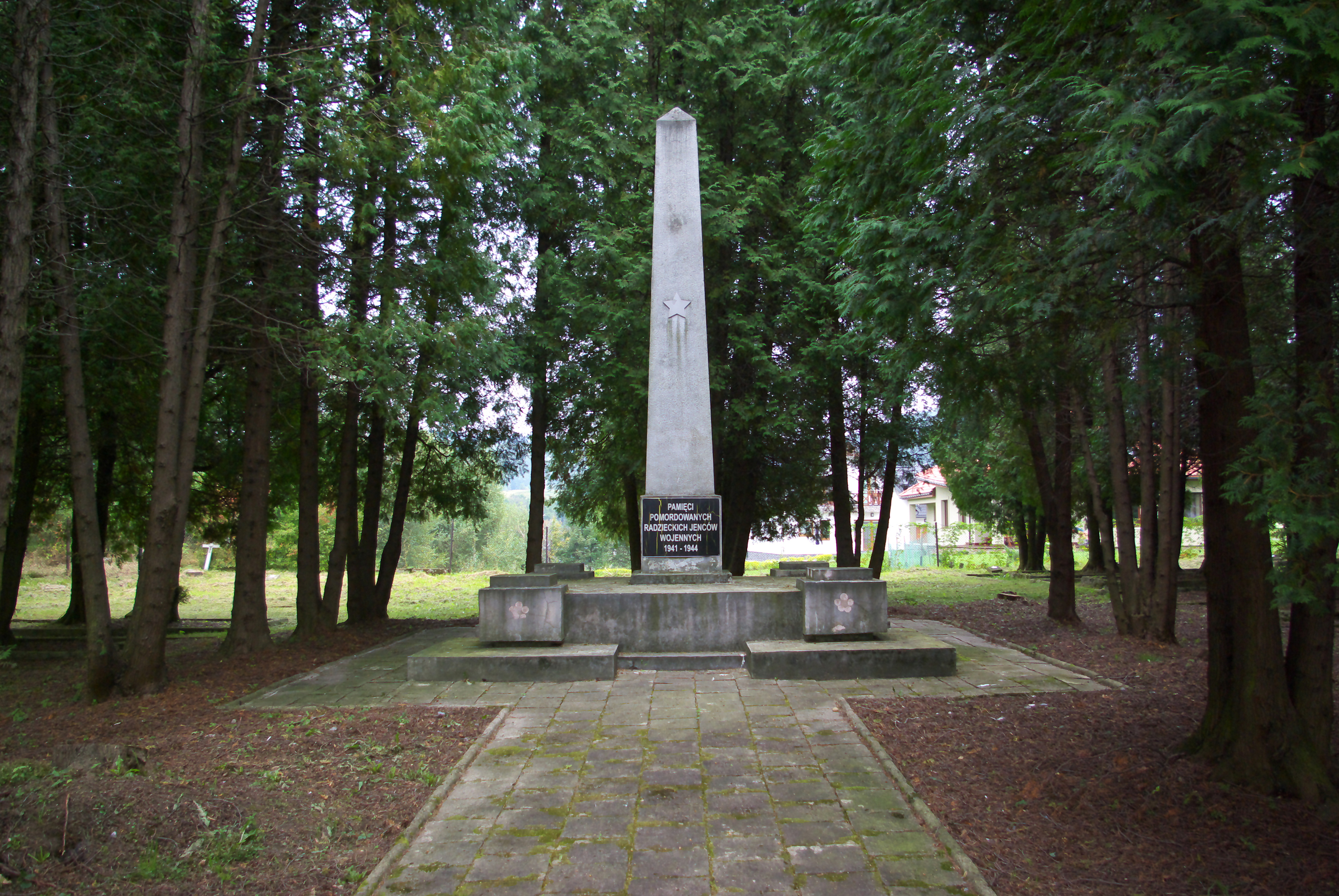
- Obelisk at the Soviet prisoners of war cemetery in Olchowce
  Central Cemetery on Rymanowska Street:
  - Mausoleum of the Victims of World War II. It was established in 1947. The tomb contains the ashes of victims from Sanok and the Sanok Land: participants in battles on the fronts of World War II, members of the resistance movement, prisoners of German concentration camps, and other individuals who were killed. In the underground part of the mausoleum, there is a metal urn containing soil from the Death Wall at the Auschwitz concentration camp and other sites of death and imprisonment. The initiative was led by the Polish Association of Former Political Prisoners of Hitler's Prisons and Concentration Camps. The designer was Stanisław Ryniak, an architectural engineer and former prisoner of the Auschwitz concentration camp (one of its earliest inmates, number 31). The mausoleum's shape resembles a crematory oven, with a front opening and an obelisk imitating a chimney. The main inscription on the plaque reads: "They offered a sacrifice of blood, suffering, and life for the Homeland in World War II. Honor to their memory". In August 1962, 12 plaques with the names and surnames of the victims were placed on the monument's side walls (originally there were 560, now totaling 577 people). Among those listed is the mayor of Sanok, Maksymilian Słuszkiewicz, arrested in 1939 and deported to the Buchenwald concentration camp, where he died in 1940.
  - The grave of those shot at Gruszka Mountain. It is located just behind the Mausoleum of the Victims of World War II. It contains the exhumed remains of Polish victims executed by the German forces on 5/6 July 1940 on the slope of Gruszka Mountain near Tarnawa Dolna (these were prisoners from the Sanok prison, previously arrested while crossing the border from Hungary – a total of 115 people). The grave has an elongated shape surrounded by a hedge, at the end of which there is a pedestal made of stones. On it, a plaque is placed with the inscription: "To the Martyrs for Freedom and Democracy. A mass grave of Poles brutally murdered by Nazi thugs during the occupation of the Sanok district from September 1939 to June 1944. Honor to your memory". Above it is the sculpture of a Falcon, created by Stanisław Jan Piątkiewicz, which was originally intended, since 1939, for the building of the Sokół movement at 13 Adam Mickiewicz Street.
  - Monument in the military section for Polish soldiers. It contains the graves of Poles who fell in the Polish-Ukrainian War of 1918–1919, the Polish-Soviet War of 1919–1920, the defensive war of 1939, and in conflicts involving the Ukrainian Insurgent Army from 1944 to 1948. The section includes 154 individual graves and two collective graves (one in the northwest corner of the section, containing 10 victims) as well as one symbolic collective grave serving as a monument. On it stands a pedestal from which rises a long, vertical Polish flag with an eagle at the top. The Virtuti Militari emblem is carved on the pedestal, along with a memorial plaque inscribed with: "In tribute to the fallen. The community of Sanok". The designer was Edmund Królicki. Construction was completed before 1 November 1959.
  - Obelisk in the section for soldiers of the Red Army. It bears a red star. It contains the graves of Soviet soldiers who died in 1944 during operations in the Sanok Land. They were part of the 101st Army Corps of the 38th Army of the 1st Ukrainian Front.
- Obelisk at the Soviet prisoners of war cemetery on Marian Zaremba Street in the Olchowce district. In its central part, there is an obelisk with the inscription: "In memory of the murdered Soviet prisoners of war 1941–1944". Approximately 10,000 prisoners who died in the Soviet prisoner of war camp are buried in the cemetery.
- Monument at the New Jewish Cemetery on Głogowa Street. It stands on the site of executions conducted by German forces during World War II. The monument was erected in 1988 on the initiative of the Nissenbaum Family Foundation. The designer and creator was Jan Pastuszak from Józefów. The inscription reads: "Whoever stands before this monument, let them bow their head and respectfully remember the martyrs who died for their homeland and faith, for the dignity and freedom of all people – against the brutality of genocidal racism. Peace to their remains! At this place during World War II, Jews, Poles, Lemkos, and Old Ruthenians were murdered by the Nazis. Israel Singer. Nissenbaum Family Foundation. 1988".

== Statues ==
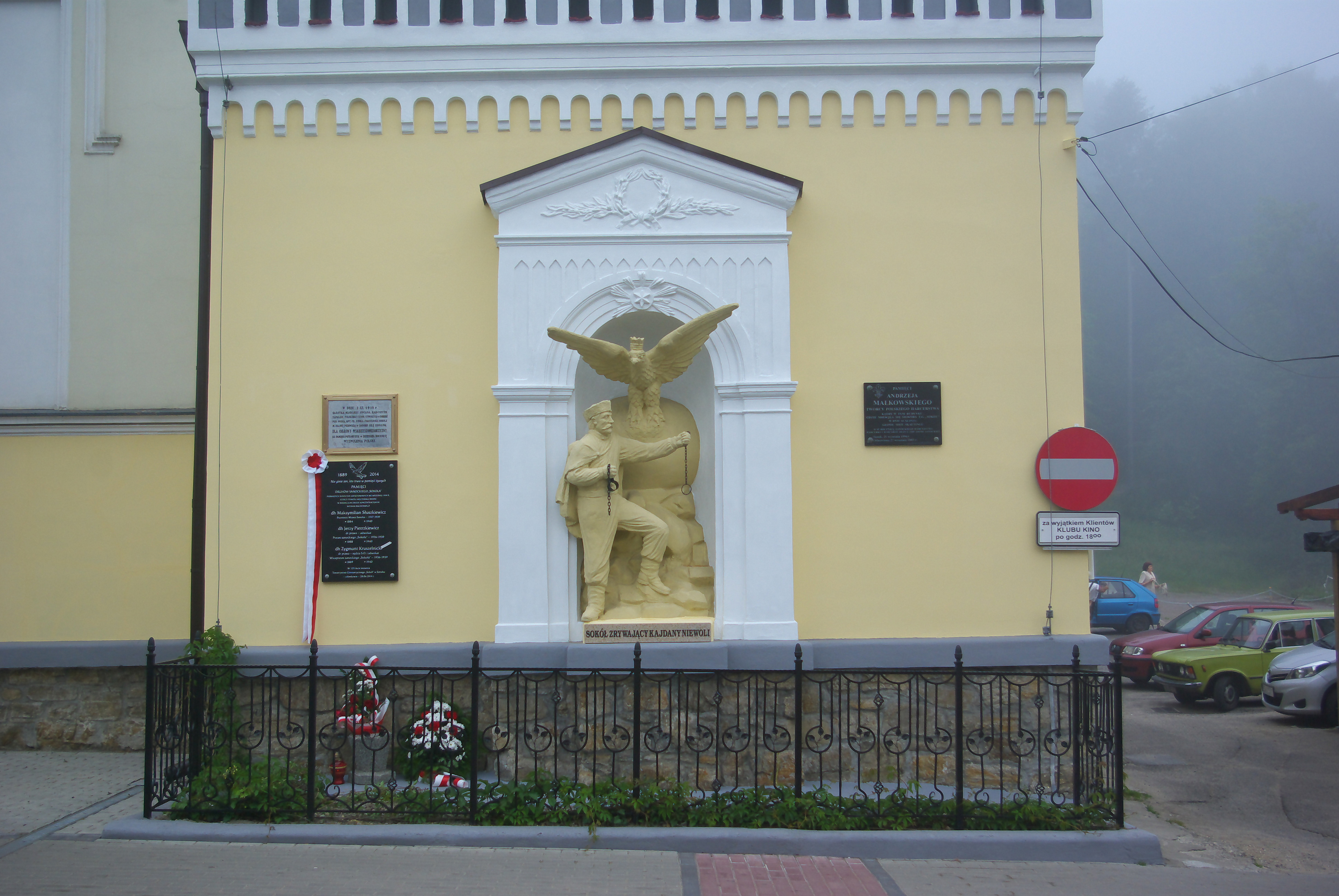
- Sculpture of a Falconer with a falcon and commemorative plaques on the Sokół movement building
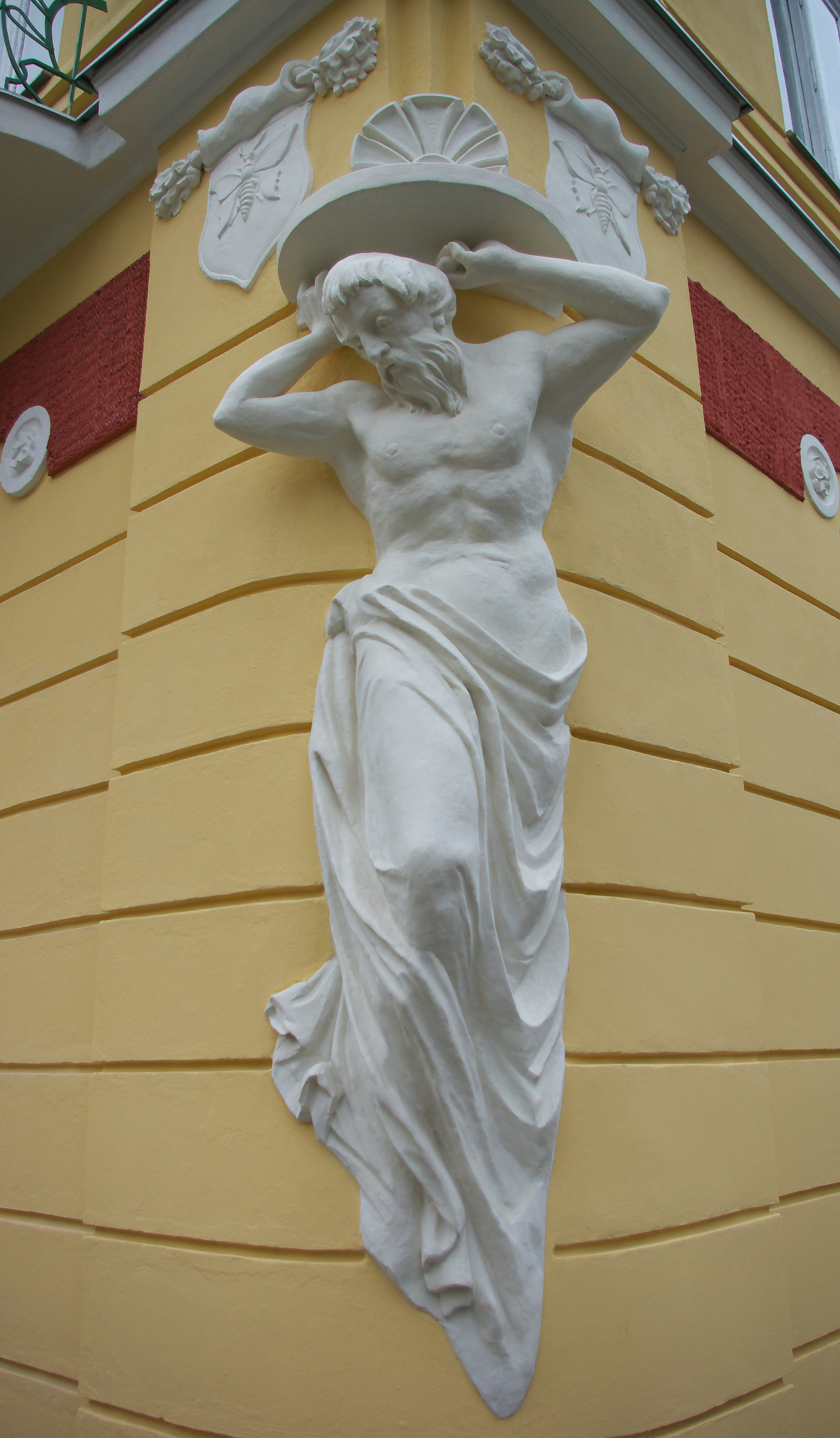
  Sculpture of Atlas on the corner of the tenement at 6 Kazimierz Wielki Street
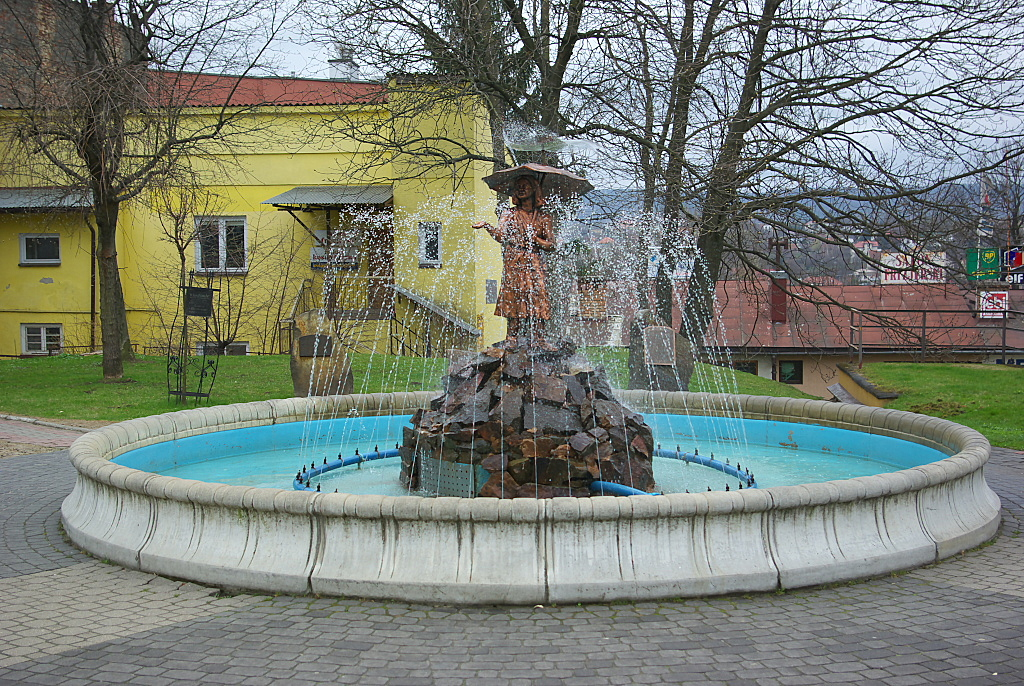
  Fountain with the sculpture Girl in the Rain at the Partner Cities Square
  Sokół movement building:
  - The building originally featured four falcon sculptures, positioned at the southern end of the roof ridge. The original sculpture, dating from 1900, was destroyed. A second sculpture, created in 1939 to replace the original, was made of stone. Its creator was Stanisław Jan Piątkiewicz, who completed the work in the summer of 1939 and delivered it on 30 August 1939. However, he was called up for military service the next day and did not receive payment; the sculpture was therefore not installed. Beginning in 1941 during the occupation, the sculpture stood in a courtyard next to the Sanok Castle and in a nearby utility building. Around 1950, it was moved to a flowerbed near the castle entrance. After the war, Piątkiewicz eventually received payment for the work, but the sculpture was not returned to its original location as the Sokół movement had been banned. In the late 1950s, it was placed on the mass grave of 117 Poles executed by German forces, located at the Central Cemetery on Rymanowska Street. The third sculpture, by Adam Przybysz, made in 2003, suffered damage (its wings fell off) and was removed on 22 June 2011. The fourth and current sculpture was installed on 29 June 2012 during the ceremony marking the 123rd anniversary of the founding of the Sokół movement in Sanok. Its creator was Dr. Krzysztof Woźniak, who died shortly after.
- A sculpture of a Falconer freeing himself from the chains of captivity held by an eagle. The first version of the sculpture no longer exists. According to Edward Zając, it was placed in a niche on the building's façade in the year it was opened, in 1899. According to another source, the falconer sculpture was created by Józef Sitarz, born in 1885, who was active later during the Second Polish Republic. The sculpture was destroyed during the German occupation in World War II. During the Polish People's Republic, a sphere was placed in the niche where the sculpture had once stood. The second and current falconer sculpture, nearly identical in appearance, was created by Adam Przybysz and was unveiled on 11 November 2003 during a ceremony organized by Krystyna Chowaniec.
- Sculpture of Atlas on the corner of the tenement at 6 Kazimierz Wielki Street's façade (hence the building is known as the "House Under Atlas"), created by Stanisław Piątkiewicz.
- A sculpture of the Blessed Virgin Mary located near the Franciscan Church and monastery in the garden adjacent to the tenement at 18 Rynek Street. At its base is the inscription: "1377 – 600 years of the Franciscans in Sanok – 1977". It was repainted in 2012. Originally, since 1898, this spot featured a statue of Jesus Christ, made by Stanisław Piątkiewicz. It was a copy of the statue of Christ designed by Bertel Thorvaldsen (placed in the Potocki Chapel at Wawel Castle). It was funded by Karol Gerardis, who donated the pedestal. The statue was made of hydraulic lime.
- Church of the Transfiguration:
  - On the front façade of the building, there is a sculpture depicting the Immaculate Conception of the Virgin Mary, created by Stanisław Piątkiewicz between 1903 and 1906 to commemorate the 50th anniversary of the Dogma of the Immaculate Conception of the Blessed Virgin Mary.
  - A statue of the Virgin Mary is located in the church vestibule on the left side.
- Church of the Ascension in Olchowce:
  - Statue of St. John of Dukla on a pedestal near the parking lot beside the church, originally placed on a section of tree trunk.
  - Sculpture of the Virgin Mary in a glass display case (from between 1999 and 2002) in the garden by the church.
  - Statue of St. Stanislaus Kostka near the rectory.
  - Wooden sculpture of Pensive Christ by the rectory.
  - Statue of St. Joseph with the Infant Jesus in a wooden chapel on a section of tree trunk in the garden by the church.
- Statue of Saint Florian on the façade of the "Firefighter's House" – Volunteer Fire Department building in Sanok at 58 Przemyska Street in the Olchowce district; unveiled in May 2000.
- Sculpture of the Immaculate Conception of the Blessed Virgin Mary on Władysław Sikorski Street. It was consecrated on 21 June 1947 by Father Władysław Zulak.
- Sculpture of the Virgin Mary located on privately owned land at 68 Rymanowska Street. It commemorates the apostolic constitution Ineffabilis Deus by Pope Pius IX on the Immaculate Conception of the Blessed Virgin Mary, proclaimed on 8 December 1854. The sculpture was created in 1905 to mark the 50th anniversary of this event. The sponsor of the sculpture was Jakub Borczyk. The inscription on the plaque placed on the pedestal reads: "Queen of Poland, pray for us! In memory of the 50th anniversary of the Immaculate Conception of the Blessed Virgin Mary. 1854 8/XII 1904".
- Sculpture of St. Joseph, created around 1932, originally located next to the orphanage founded by the Galician Congregation of the Servant Sisters of the Blessed Virgin Mary from Stara Wieś, at the present-day Władysław Sikorski Street in Sanok. It was removed during World War II, then placed next to the former Children's Home at 38 Adam Mickiewicz Street, which since 2008 has been housed in the dormitory building at King Kazimierz Wielki School Complex (later School Complex No. 5) at 21 Sadowa Street.
- Two sculptures: the Sacred Heart of Jesus and the Immaculate Heart of Mary, placed on the façade of the tenement at 3 Henryk Sienkiewicz Street.
- Partner Cities Square:
  - Sculpture Girl in the Rain, also known as Girl (or Young Lady) with an Umbrella, located in a fountain. It was funded by local business owners and installed in November 2004. The designer was Adam Przybysz, and financial support for its creation was provided by the Subcarpathian Cooperative Bank.
  - Sculpture of a lion on a pedestal, commemorating the 20th anniversary of the partnership between the cities of Sanok and Reinheim; unveiled during anniversary celebrations on 2 August 2014. The inscription reads: "Reinheim Sanok 1994–2014".
- Outdoor sculptures by Roman Tarkowski: the sculpture Warriors installed on Zamkowa Street in Sanok in June 1975 on the occasion of the Days of Culture, Education, Books, and Press; the sculpture Diana with a Fawn, originally located at St. John's Square, was moved near the Sanok Castle in the early 21st century.
- Bust of Father Zdzisław Peszkowski, unveiled at Harcerski Square on 23 August 2022, on the 104th anniversary of the priest's birth.

== Commemorative stones ==
- A stone dedicated to Adam Mickiewicz, located on the Adam Mickiewicz Mound within the city park at the top of Parkowa Hill. It consists of a concrete pedestal with the inscription: "Adamowi Mickiewiczowi 1798–1898".
- The Millennium Stone, commemorating the Millennium of the Polish State, is located on Gregory of Sanok Street next to the Ramerówka building. The inscription reads: "One Thousand Years of the Polish State. Eight Hundred Years of Sanok 1960". It was unveiled on 25 April 1960. The monument was designed by Kazimierz Florek, engineer Edmund Królicki, and sculptor Stanisław Jan Piątkiewicz.
- A monument commemorating the officers of the District Public Security Office in Sanok who died in an attack by the anti-communist partisan unit led by Antoni Żubryd is located on Krakowska Street in the Dąbrówka district, next to the Sanok Dąbrówka railway station. The monument comprises three memorial stones. One originally bore a plaque reading: "In memory of the officers of P.U.B.P. murdered on 30 April 1946 by Żubryd's gang: Bronisława Drwięga, Karol Kudy, Julian Łabuda. The community of Sanok. October 1974", which disappeared in the 1990s. The monument was designed by Barbara Bandurka and was established in 1974 under the then-communist administration. It was unveiled in October 1974. The plaque disappeared in the 1990s, leaving only the three stones.
- A memorial stone commemorating the 2nd Podhale Rifles Regiment is located in front of the building at 21 Adam Mickiewicz Street, which formerly served as military barracks and is now the seat of the Jan Grodek State University. It was unveiled on 3 October 1993. The monument commemorates the soldiers of the 2nd Podhale Rifles Regiment and the members of the Home Army. The designer of the obelisk was senior warrant officer Andrzej Siwiec. The monument features the coat of arms of the 2nd Podhale Rifles Regiment and a plaque with the inscription: "In memory of the soldiers of the 2nd Podhale Rifles Regiment and their successors from the Home Army District SAN in the struggle for Poland's independence. The community of the Sanok Land".
- A commemorative stone located on Zamkowa Street, opposite the former site of the Great Synagogue. The monument, unveiled in 2014, commemorates the Jews who died in Sanok during World War II. The project was approved by the Sanok City Council on 25 April 2013 and funded from the municipal budget. The inscription (in Polish, Hebrew, and English), proposed by the Israel–Poland Friendship Society, reads: "Opposite stood a synagogue, desecrated and burned by the German occupiers. In memory of over 10,000 Jews from Sanok and the surrounding area murdered during World War II by German genocidal perpetrators".
- A commemorative stone placed in front of the Church of the Transfiguration marks parish missions held from 1 to 8 April 2017; the inscription reads: "The love of Christ compels us (2 Corinthians 5:14). Parish evangelization missions April 1–8, 2017".
Commemorative stones

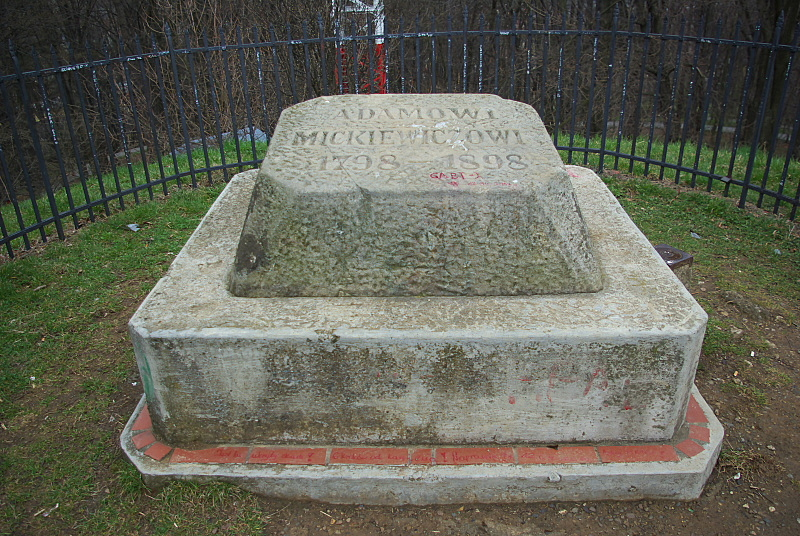
Stone commemorating Adam Mickiewicz

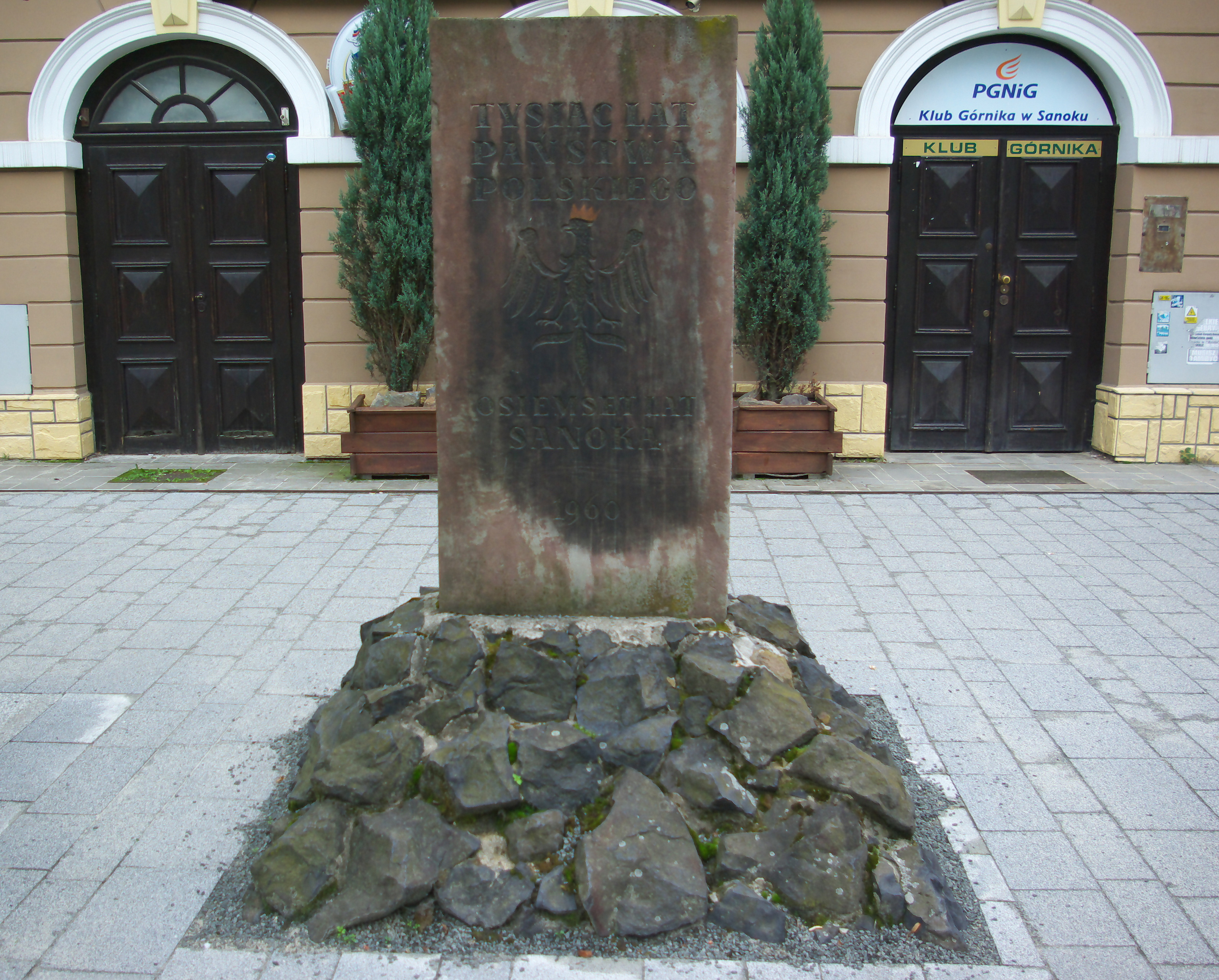
Millenium Stone

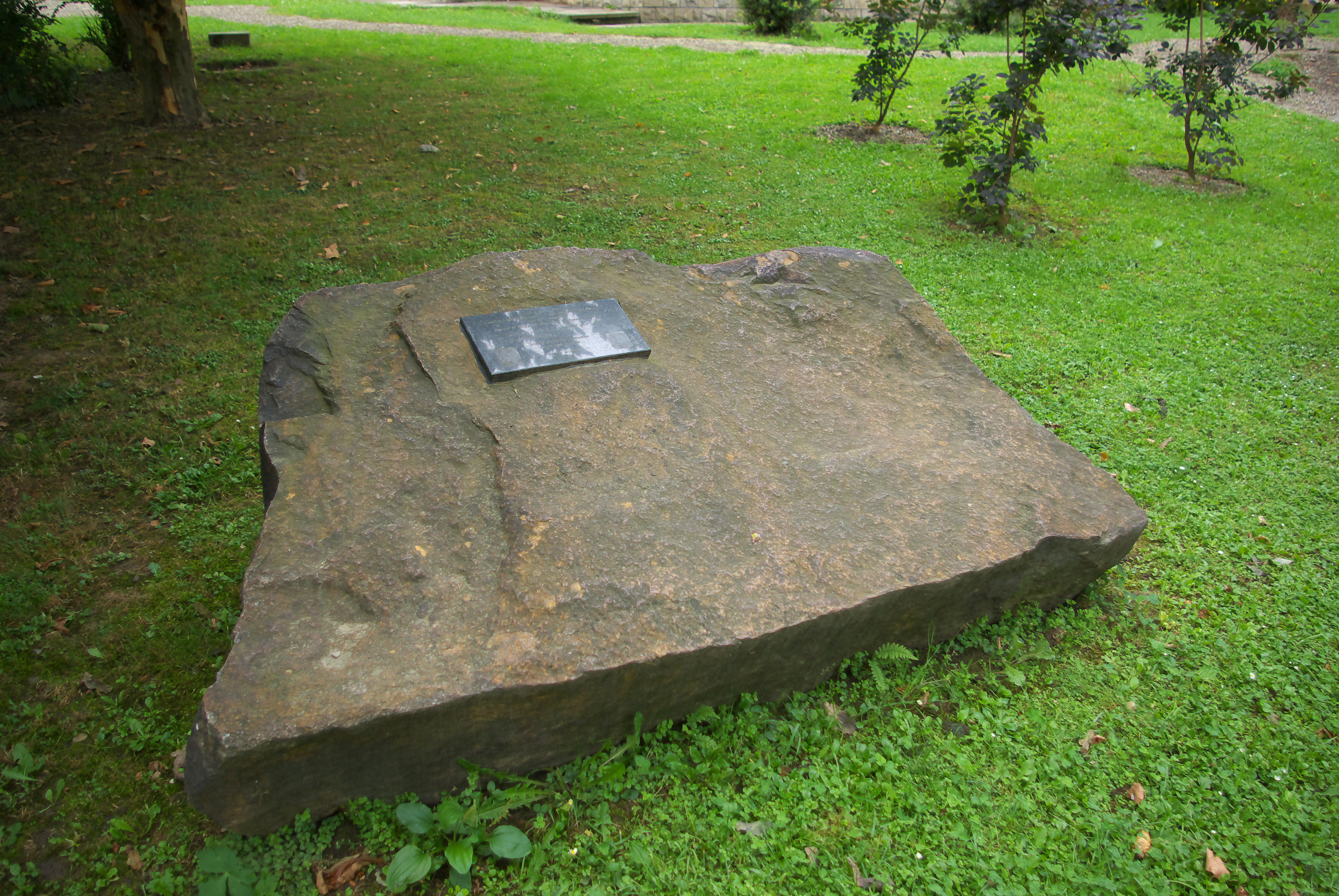
Stone commemorating the history of the city

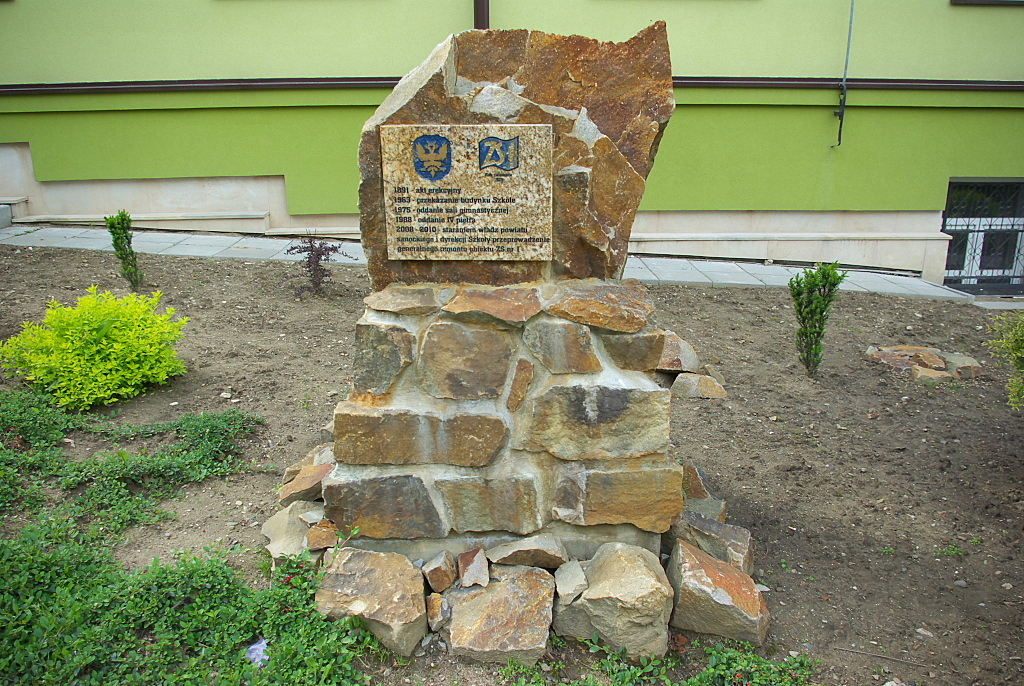
Stone commemorating the history of the School Complex No. 1

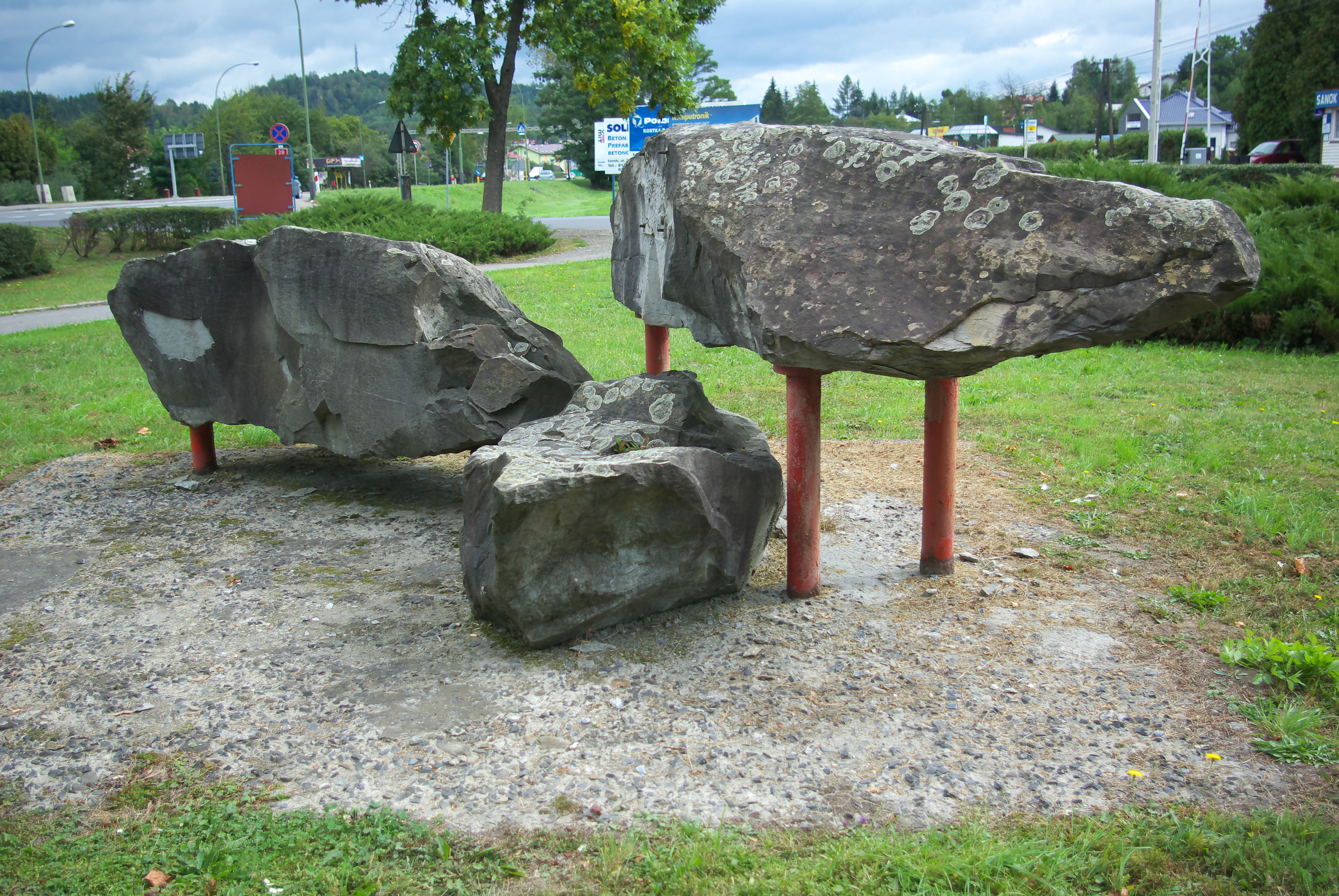
Monument commemorating the fallen officers of the District Public Security Office

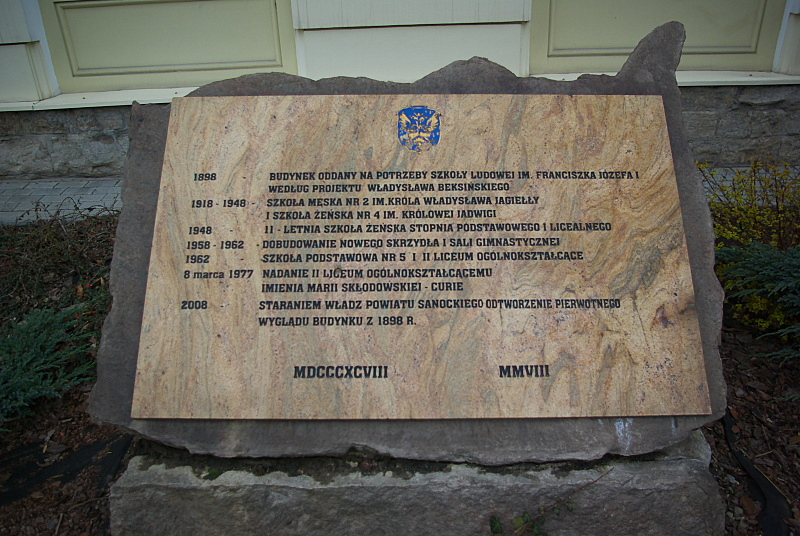
Stone commemorating the history of High School No. 2

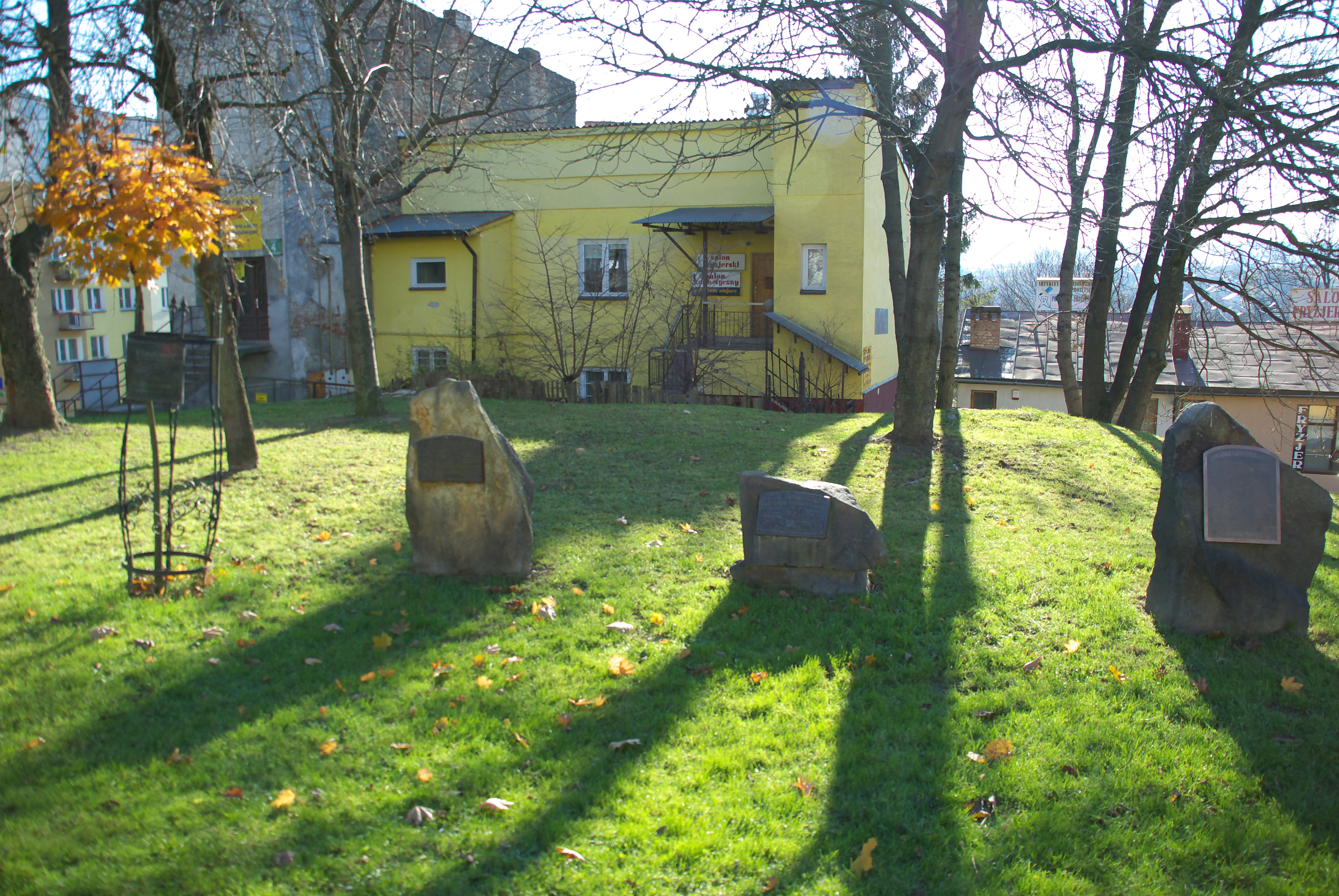
Commemorative stones at the Partner Cities Square

== Commemorative trees ==
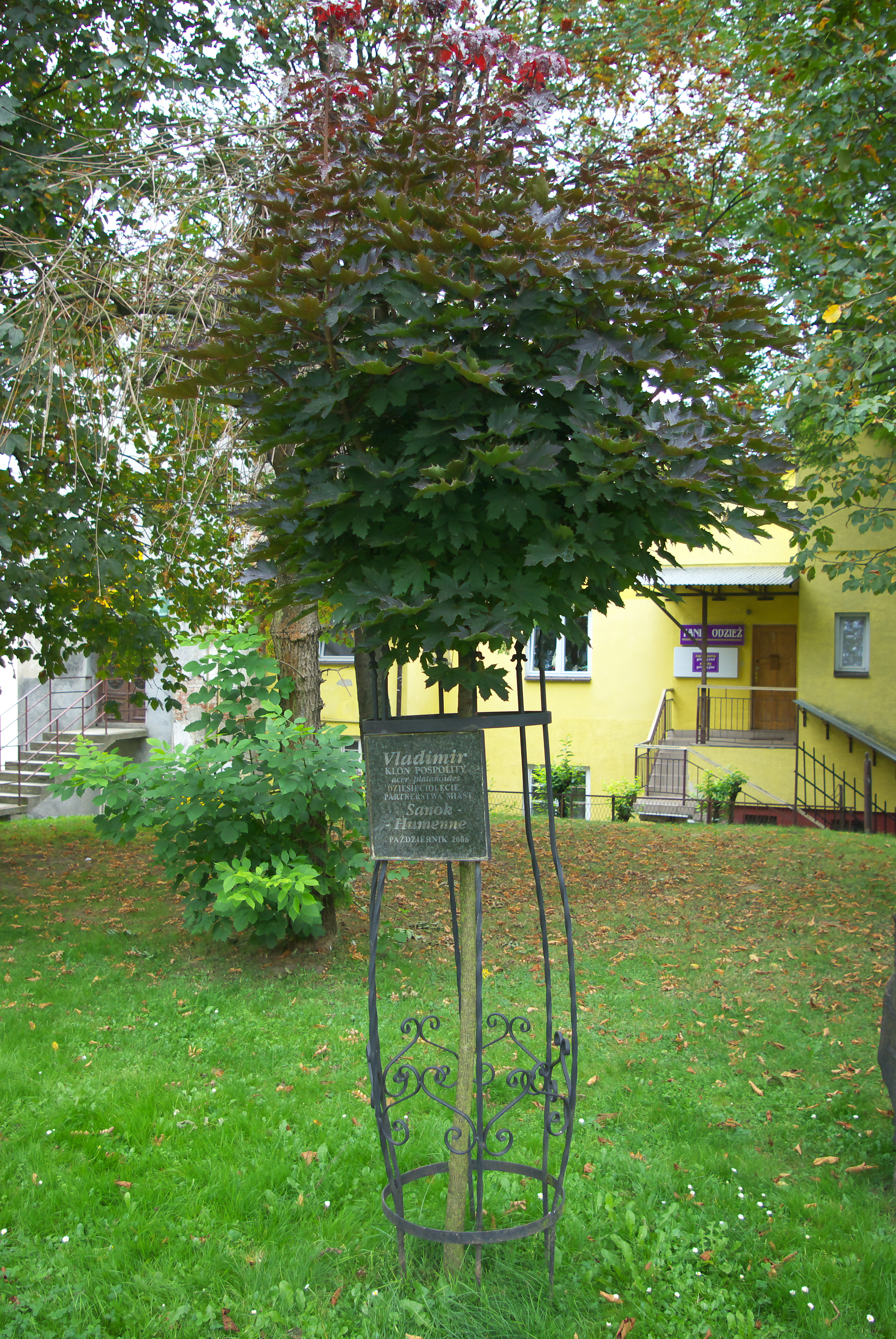
- Vladimir – Norway maple – at the Partner Cities Square
  A northern red oak planted on the grounds of the Jan Grodek State University by the Sanok District Board of the League for Nature Conservation on the occasion of the National Independence Day.
- A southern catalpa planted by the western façade of the Church of the Transfiguration on 14 November 2004 during the celebrations of the 100th anniversary of the Society of Friends of Sanok and the Sanok Land.
- A columnar oak tree commemorates painter Zdzisław Beksiński, planted in the Beksiński Green Square on Jagiellońska Street, the location where he lived until 1970.
- At Harcerski Square's southern side, bordering Maria Skłodowska-Curie High School:
  - A silver birch tree named "Inka" commemorating Danuta Siedzikówna, codenamed Inka. It was unveiled on 10 November 2016.
  - A maple tree named "Rotmistrz" commemorates Witold Pilecki. It was unveiled on 11 November 2015. The inscription on the plaque reads: "Rotmistrz. Maple (Acer campestre 'Postelense') in tribute to Capt. Witold Pilecki. Mayor of the City of Sanok, Bieszczady District Board of the League for Nature Conservation. 11 November 2015".
  - A maple tree named "Kazimierz" commemorating Kazimierz Tumidajski. The inscription on the plaque reads: "Kazimierz. Maple (Acer negundo) in tribute to Kazimierz Tumidajski. 11 November 2017. Mayor of the City of Sanok, Bieszczady District Board of the League for Nature Conservation".
- Adam Mickiewicz Park – four memorial trees commemorating scouting activists were planted on 2 October 2010:
  - A plane tree commemorates Andrzej Małkowski (1888–1919). The plaque reads: "Plane tree Andrzej in tribute to Andrzej Małkowski, founder of Polish scouting. ZHP Sanok District named after priest scoutmaster Zdzisław Peszkowski. 100 years of Polish scouting. Sanok, 2 October 2010".
  - A plane tree commemorates Olga Małkowska (1888–1979). The plaque reads: "Plane tree Oleńka in tribute to scoutmaster Olga Małkowska, founder of female scouting. ZHP Sanok District named after priest scoutmaster Zdzisław Peszkowski. 100 years of Polish scouting. Sanok, 2 October 2010".
  - A plane tree commemorates Albina Wójcik (1901–1982). The plaque reads: "Plane tree Albina in tribute to scoutmaster Albina Wójcik, longtime commander of the Sanok female scouts district. ZHP Sanok District named after priest scoutmaster Zdzisław Peszkowski. 100 years of Polish scouting. Sanok, 2 October 2010".
  - A plane tree commemorates Czesław Borczyk (1910–2004). The plaque reads: "Plane tree Czesław in tribute to scoutmaster Czesław Borczyk, longtime commander of the Sanok scouting district. ZHP Sanok District named after priest scoutmaster Zdzisław Peszkowski. 100 years of Polish scouting. Sanok, 2 October 2010".
- Partner Cities Square:
  - Norway maple planted to commemorate the 10th anniversary of the partnership between Sanok and the Slovak town of Humenné, named after the mayor of Humenné, Vladimír Kostilník. The plaque inscription reads: "Vladimir. Norway maple / Acer platanoides. Tenth anniversary of the Sanok – Humenné city partnership. October 2006". It was planted during the 10th anniversary of the partnership on 6–7 October 2012.
  - Globe maple planted to commemorate the 10th anniversary of the partnership between Sanok and the Hungarian town of Gyöngyös. The plaque inscription reads: "Gyöngyös. Globe maple / Acer globosum. Tenth anniversary of the Sanok – Gyöngyös city partnership. August 2013". The unveiling was performed by the mayors of both towns.
- Norway maple planted by Zamkowa Street (next to the castle's entrance gate) as part of the celebrations of the 100th anniversary of Poland regaining independence, which took place on 11 November 2018.

== Commemorative plaques ==
- A plaque on the building of the Sanok Castle commemorating the stay of the Emperor of Austria, Franz Joseph I, on 31 October and 1 November 1851, which was installed in 1908.
- Adam Mickiewicz Park:
  - A plaque commemorates Frédéric Chopin on the 100th anniversary of the composer's birth (1910). It is located by the so-called Chopin Spring on the northern slope of the park. Established by the Society for the Beautification of the City of Sanok, it features the composer's image and an inscription that reads: "To commemorate the hundredth anniversary of the birth of the Polish musical genius Fryderyk Chopin, His Excellency Dr. Aleksander Mniszek-Tchorznicki, the lord of the free city of Sanok, donated the land for Chopin Park, and the Society for the Beautification of the City of Sanok arranged and decorated this spring and entrusted it to the care of all Sanok residents. 1910". The bronze plaque was created by sculptor Maria Gerson-Dąbrowska and cast at the Sanok Wagon Factory.
  - Building of the former municipal waterworks:
    - A plaque dating from 1936 commemorates the launch of the municipal waterworks. The inscription reads: "This waterworks was built with financial support from labor funds from February 1934 to July 1936. It was opened on 2 August 1936 during the presidency of the Republic of Poland's Prof. Ignacy Mościcki, governance of the Lwów Voivodeship by Colonel Władysław Belina-Prażmowski, Sanok County by Major Wojciech Bucior, and the free royal city of Sanok by Mayor Dr Jan Rajchel. Designed by Prof. Otto Nadolski. Executed by the City Board and the company of Engineer Jerzy Dobrowolski. The works were supervised by Engineer Roman Wajda".
    - A plaque commemorating the 50th anniversary of the municipal waterworks, established in 1934. It was commissioned by the Sanok Municipal Services Company in May 1984 and unveiled on 8 June 1984 during the jubilee celebrations. The inscription reads: "The Sanok Municipal Services Company in Sanok funded this plaque to commemorate the 50th anniversary of the municipal waterworks. Sanok 1984".
- Building of the Sokół movement in Sanok at 13 Adam Mickiewicz Street:
  - A plaque unveiled on 1 November 1928 to commemorate the 10th anniversary of regaining independence and the departure of the first Polish patrols from the Sanok branch of the Sokół movement on 1 November 1918. It is placed on the front façade. During World War II, it was saved by the caretaker Władysław Ziąbrowski, who removed and hid it. Construction foreman Emil Rudak kept the plaque, and after 1944 it was transferred to the Sanok Historical Museum. It was unveiled again on 10 November 1988, marking the 70th anniversary of regaining independence and the events in Sanok at that time. The inscription reads: "On 1 November 1918, a handful of youth, inspired by the joyful zeal of Polish action, formed in Sokół under the command of Captain Fr. Stok and Sokół leader M. Szajna the first armed force in Sanok to defend the resurrected Homeland. To the memory of descendants on the tenth anniversary of Poland's liberation".
  - Memorial plaque dedicated to Andrzej Małkowski (1888–1919), founder of Polish scouting, commemorates his presentation of scouting ideas in the building on 11 November 1911. The plaque was unveiled on 21 September 1996, on the 85th anniversary of scouting in Sanok, by scout leaders Ryszard Pacławski and Czesław Borczyk, and consecrated by Father Marian Burczyk. The plaque was renovated on 27 September 2003 and again in May 2014. The inscription reads: "To the memory of Andrzej Małkowski, founder of Polish scouting, who in this building, which housed the headquarters of the T.G. Sokół, on 11 November 1911 proclaimed the ideas of scouting. On the 85th anniversary of scouting in Sanok. Girl and boy scouts of the ZHP Sanok District. Sanok, 21 September 1996".
  - Plaque commemorating the activists of the Sokół movement, unveiled during the celebrations of the 125th anniversary of the Sanok branch of Sokół on 7 June 2014. It commemorates: the last president of the society before World War II, Jerzy Pietrzkiewicz; vice president Zygmunt Kruszelnicki; and the then mayor of the city Maksymilian Słuszkiewicz – who during the September Campaign were arrested and deported to the Buchenwald concentration camp, where they died at the turn of 1939 and 1940.
  - Plaque commemorating Poles who died during World War II. Established by the Society of Lovers of Lviv and the South-Eastern Borderlands, Sanok Club, and unveiled on 16 May 2015 to mark the 25th anniversary of society's founding. The inscription reads: "In memory of the Poles, residents of Lviv and the South-Eastern Borderlands of the Second Polish Republic, victims of German, Soviet, and Ukrainian nationalist crimes during World War II. Members of the Society of Lovers of Lviv and the South-Eastern Borderlands, Sanok Club, on the 25th anniversary of its founding, May 2015".
  - Commemorative plaque created in 2017, bearing the inscription: "1867 – 2017. On the 150th anniversary of the founding of the Polish Gymnastic Society Sokół in Lviv – to the glory of the Sokół members who fought for the freedom and independence of Poland". It was unveiled during the 130th anniversary celebrations of the Sokół branch in Sanok on 29 June 2019.
  - Commemorative plaque bearing the inscription: "11.11.1918 – 11.11.2018. On the 100th anniversary of Poland regaining independence, we honour the national leaders and heroes: Marshal Józef Piłsudski, Roman Dmowski, Ignacy Paderewski, General Józef Haller, General Tadeusz Rozwadowski, Wincenty Witos… The plaque was funded by the TG Sokół in Sanok. 11 November 2018". It was unveiled on 11 November 2018 as part of the centenary celebrations of Poland's independence. It was re-unveiled and blessed during the 130th anniversary ceremony of the Sokół movement branch in Sanok on 29 June 2019.
  - Commemorative plaque with the inscription: "Hail to the Homeland – Claw to the Enemy. 1889–2019. 130 years of Sokół in Sanok. Comrades honored for Sokół and Sanok. Dr Karol Zaleski (1856–1941) / Dr Karol Petelenz (1847–1930) / Adam Pytel (1856–1928) / Feliks Giela (1859–1936) / Dr Stanisław Biega (1862–1923) / Eng. Władysław Adamczyk (…–1915) / Dr Emil Gaweł (1875–1921) / Jan Killar (1884–1939) / Major Tadeusz Zbyszycki (1892–1987) / Marian Szajna (1873–1936)". The plaque was funded by the Sokół movement in Sanok on 20 June 2019. It was unveiled and blessed during the 130th anniversary celebrations of the Sokół movement branch in Sanok on 29 June 2019.
- Building at 24 Adam Mickiewicz Street (Sanok Cultural Center):
  - Plaque commemorating Adam Mickiewicz. Established on 26 November 1955, marking the 100th anniversary of the poet's death. It is located in the foyer of the building. The inscription, authored by Dr. Edmund Słuszkiewicz, reads: "To the Bard of the Nation Adam Mickiewicz on the 100th anniversary of his death 1855–1955. In tribute from the citizens of the city of Sanok". The plaque was designed by Kazimierz Florek and made by Franciszek Łuczywo.
  - Commemorative plaque marking the founding of the Polish Numismatic Society, Sanok Branch, was installed in the building on 10 October 1972. On the occasion of its 25th anniversary, the branch was named after Rudolf Mękicki. The plaque was unveiled in the vestibule of the building by Mękicki's children, Krystyna and Juliusz Mękicki, on 10 October 1997 during the branch's 25th anniversary celebrations. The inscription reads: "In this building on 10 October 1972, the Polish Numismatic Society, Sanok Branch, began its activity. On the occasion of the 25th anniversary, the branch was named after the distinguished numismatist and native of Lviv, Rudolf Mękicki. Sanok numismatists. Sanok, 10 October 1997".
- Commemorative plaques mounted on the façade of the Sanok City Hall at 1 Rynek Street:
  - Plaque marking the 80th anniversary of the rebirth of the Republic of Poland, commemorating local residents who suffered for their homeland. Unveiled on 11 November 1998 by Krosno Voivode Bogdan Rzońca and Sanok Mayor Edward Olejko, and blessed by Father Feliks Kwaśny. The inscription reads: "In eternal memory of those who, in time of need, answered the call of the homeland and sacrificed their health and lives on its altar. On the 80th anniversary of the rebirth of the Republic – grateful citizens of Sanok".
  - Plaque commemorating the centenary of the founding of the Sanok City Beautification Society in 1904. Unveiled on 14 November 2004 during the celebrations marking the 100th anniversary of the Friends of Sanok and the Sanok Land Society.
  - Memorial plaque commemorating Czesława Kurasz (1938–2023), unveiled on 7 March 2024.
- Plaque commemorating Franciszek Ksawery Krasicki and his companions for the last defense of the Sanok Castle against the Austrians in June 1809. Established on the 100th anniversary of the event. Funded by the Society for the Development and Beautification of the City of Sanok in 1909 and made of granite. It is placed on the slope near the Castle Stairs, below the Zaleski Villa. The inscription reads: "To the memory of Ksawery Krasicki and his companions, for the heroic act during the last defense of the Sanok Castle in June 1809. On the centennial anniversary, this inscription was placed by the Society for the Beautification of the City of Sanok". It is one of the oldest existing memorial plaques in Sanok.
- Zaleski Villa at 1 Saint John Square:
  - A plaque commemorating Dr. Karol Zaleski, installed on 24 August 1996 on the building; the donors were the Sanok branch of the Polish Tourist and Sightseeing Society and the Society for the Development and Beautification of the City of Sanok.
  - A memorial plaque on the façade of Zaleski Villa from 2007. It commemorates the secret teaching conducted in the building by scoutmaster and teacher Jadwiga Zaleska during the German occupation from 1939 to 1945 (the initiative for its establishment was by Anna Taworska-Strzelecka).
- Plaques commemorating Gregory of Sanok (1406–1477):
  - The first was established on the 500th anniversary of his death. It is located on the façade of the building at 2 Zamkowa Street (the so-called Inn, now the seat of the Sanok Historical Museum), next to the entrance door. The plaque was unveiled during the Days of Sanok on 30 May 1977 by the rector of the Jagiellonian University, Professor Mieczysław Karaś. The bronze plaque, measuring 90×60 cm, was created by the sculptor Roman Tarkowski. The inscription reads: "Gregory of Sanok 1406–1477. A great humanist and poet. On the 500th anniversary of his death. The people of Sanok".
  - The second is located in the building at 2 Teofil Lenartowicz Street, which houses the Gregory of Sanok Public Library. It was unveiled on 3 May 1986 and bears the inscription: "Fate gave me Sanok as my homeland. Gregory of Sanok. To the great humanist – the people of Sanok. 3 May 1985".
- Plaques commemorating the Hunger March of 6 March 1930:
  - The first was established on the 20th anniversary of the events. It is located on the façade of the tenement house at 2 Józef Piłsudski Street. The inscription on the plaque reads: "In commemoration of the united struggle of the workers of the Sanok Wagon Factory and the unemployed of Sanok County for work and bread, fought on 6 March 1930 against the regime of sanacja oppression, this street was renamed. Sanok, 6 March 1950".
  - The second is on the façade of the tenement house at 3 3 Maja Street (opposite the building at 2 Józef Piłsudski Street), unveiled on 30 May 1979 by local authorities. The unveiling was carried out by the First Secretary of the Sanok Municipal Committee of the Polish United Workers' Party, Wiesław Skałkowski. The inscription reads: "In commemoration of the united struggle of Sanowag workers and the unemployed for work and bread on 6 March 1930. This struggle went down in the city's history as the Hunger March. The society of the city of Sanok, 30 May 1979". The plaque was designed and made by Władysław Kandefer.
- A commemorative plaque on the building at 17 Ignacy Daszyński Street from 1934, commemorating the Sanok branch of the Polish Red Cross; it featured the Polish coat of arms and an inscription in Latin: "In bello et in pace caritas. 1 IX Sanok 1934 (Love in war and peace. 1 September Sanok 1934)". After World War II, the plaque was replaced with a sign, and on its reverse side, the inscription read: "PCK Common Room – 14 May 1950 – Sanok". The plaque was restored in the early 21st century.
- A plaque commemorating the construction of the new hospital in Sanok and the contributions of Dr. Jan Zigmund (1902–1970). It was unveiled in April 1979 on the wall of the building at 26 800-lecia Street, under the arched entrance arcades. The inscription reads: "To the social initiators of the construction of the Sanok hospital under the leadership of Dr. Jan Zigmund, in recognition of their merits – the society of Sanok, 04.1979". The plaque was designed by Barbara Bandurka.
- A plaque markingthe 150th anniversary of the Sanok Bus Factory and the history of the labour and trade union movement within it. It was unveiled in October 1982 as part of the celebrations of the factory's 150th anniversary, in the building of the Factory Cultural Centre. It depicts the likenesses of three workers and the outline of the factory buildings in the background, with the following inscription below: "On the 100th anniversary of the Polish labour movement and the 80th anniversary of the formation of organised forms of the trade union movement in the Sanok Bus Factory. The crew on the 150th anniversary of the Sanok factory. December 1982".
- A commemorative plaque established to mark the 50th anniversary of the founding of the Alliance of Democrats, a political party established on 15 April 1939. It is located on the façade of the building at 22 Tadeusz Kościuszko Street, known as the "Beskid" building, which housed the Municipal Committee of the Alliance of Democrats in Sanok (currently home to the Subcarpathian Cooperative Bank). The initiative to establish the plaque came from Ludwik Romaniak. It was unveiled on 2 May 1989 by senior members of the Alliance of Democrats, Maria Lisowska and Stefan Stefański. The marble plaque was made by Jan Zajdel.
- A plaque commemorating the Home Army located on the façade of the building at 4 Tadeusz Kościuszko Street. In 1944 and during the early years of Polska Ludowa, an NKVD prison operated in the basement of the building, where from 1944 to 1947 independence activists – members of the Home Army, the National Military Organization, and Youth of Greater Poland – were imprisoned. This is commemorated by a plaque on the southern elevation of the building, established on the 50th anniversary of the founding of the Home Army and unveiled on 20 December 1992. The initiative came from the Sanok branch of the World Association of Home Army Soldiers. The plaque was designed by Władysław Kandefer. It bears the inscription: "In this building, in the years 1944–1947, members of the Home Army, the National Military Organization, and the Youth of Greater Poland were imprisoned and tortured by the NKVD. Installed on the 50th anniversary of the founding of the Home Army. Sanok 1992". The inscription was criticized by former underground Home Army officer Julian Rudak.
- A commemorative plaque on the façade of the former seat of the communal hall of Posada Olchowska (incorporated into Sanok in 1931 and now a district known as Posada). The inscription on the plaque reads: "In memory of the 100th anniversary of the construction of the Municipal Hall and the 80th anniversary of the incorporation of Gmina Posada Olchowska into the city of Sanok, in honour of the achievements of generations. Grateful residents of Posada. Sanok, September 2009". The plaque was unveiled on 13 September 2009 by the oldest resident of the Posada district at the time, Zbigniew Wolwowicz.
- A plaque with the inscription: "1929–2009. To the founders and activists of the Sanok branches of the Polish Tatra Society and the Polish Tourist and Sightseeing Society, who contributed to the development of tourism in Sanok. 24 October 2009 Board and members of the PTTK Ziemia Sanocka Branch in Sanok". It was unveiled on 24 October 2009 on the southern façade of the building at 2 3 Maja Street, the headquarters of the Polish Tourist and Sightseeing Society branch in Sanok.
- Headquarters of the Bieszczady Group of GOPR in Sanok at 49 Adam Mickiewicz Street:
  - A plaque commemorating Karol Dziuban, the key figure in establishing the Bieszczady Group of GOPR. It was unveiled on 11 October 1986 on the occasion of the group's 25th anniversary. The inscription on the plaque reads: "To Karol Dziuban 1922–1974, the first chief of the Bieszczady Group of GOPR on its 25th anniversary. Rescuers. October 1986".
  - A plaque commemorating Andrzej "Duśek" Kurek, a GOPR rescuer (died 1993). It was unveiled on 13 September 2011. The design and execution of the plaque were by Roman Dawidziak.
- Commemorative plaque on the façade of the Scout House at 39 Zielona Street in the Błonie district, dedicated to Father Scoutmaster Zdzisław Peszkowski, a native of Sanok, unveiled on 10 November 2008.
- A commemorative plaque on the façade of the Border Guard Station building in Sanok at 23 Adam Mickiewicz Street, formerly a military barracks.
- A plaque commemoratingthree soldiers of the National Armed Forces (Henryk Książek, Władysław Kudlik, Władysław Skwarc) executed in public executions in the city on 24 May and 4 June 1946. The inscription reads: "In memory of the soldiers of the anti-communist partisan unit of the National Armed Forces under the command of Captain Antoni Żubryd, executed by communist oppressors in public executions: Corporal Henryk Książek, hanged on 4 June 1946 in the Sanok market square, and Władysław Kudlik and Władysław Skwarc, hanged on 24 May 1946 at the Sanok stadium. 4 June 2014. The people of Sanok". It is placed on the façade of the tenement house at 20 Rynek Street, adjacent to the Franciscan Church in Sanok.
- On 28 October 2015, a plaque commemorating Łukasz Ciepliński, imprisoned in the Sanok prison during World War II, was unveiled on the southern outer wall of the detention facility buildings in Sanok.
- A plaque on the building of the Sanok railway station at Dworcowa Street, unveiled on 20 June 2017.
- A plaque commemorating Marian Pankowski, unveiled on 18 June 2017 on the façade of the building housing the Gregory of Sanok Public Library. The inscription reads: "Marian Pankowski. Sanok – Brussels. 9 November 1919 – 3 April 2011. I observed it all in the name of Speech". The plaque was funded by Janusz Szuber and Janina Lewandowska.
- A plaque commemorating Colonel Zygmunt Żyłka-Żebracki was unveiled on 18 August 2018 on the building at 3 Za Potokiem Street, where the colonel lived with his wife Maria. The unveiling was organised by scoutmaster Krystyna Chowaniec from the Sanok branch of the World Association of Home Army Soldiers, and the plaque was funded by a relative of the Żyłka-Żebracki couple, Professor Barbara Adamiak, who unveiled it together with the Deputy Mayor of Sanok, Edward Olejko.
- A plaque commemorating Father Adam Sudoł was unveiled on 3 May 2021 on the wall next to the entrance of the tenement at 10 John III Sobieski Street. It was funded by the Solidarity community.
Commemorative plaques

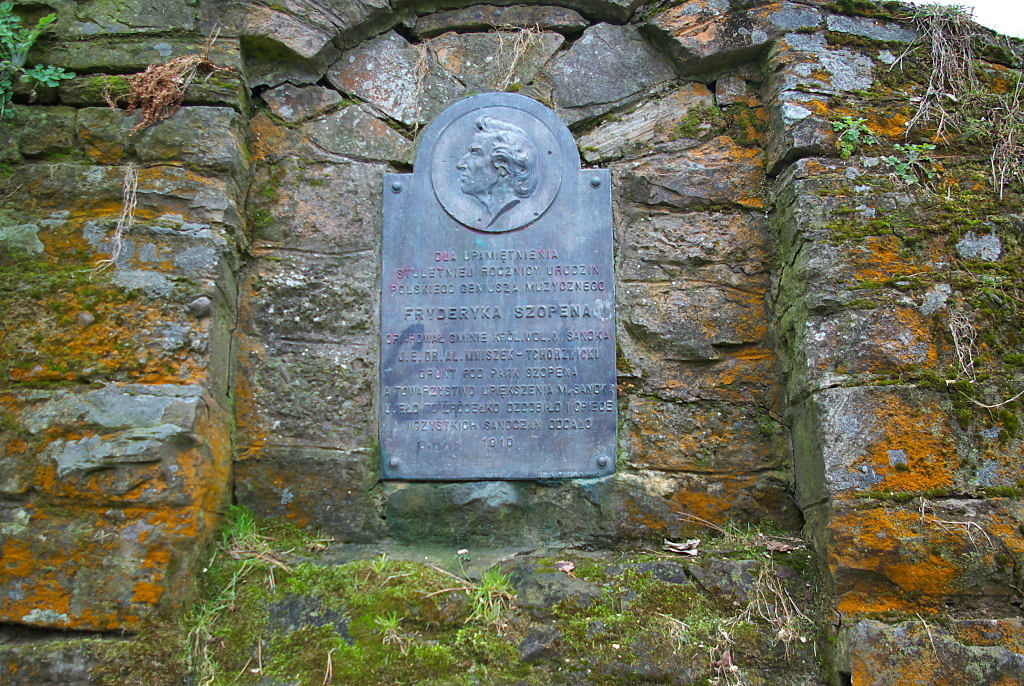
Commemorative plaque at the city park in honor of Frédéric Chopin

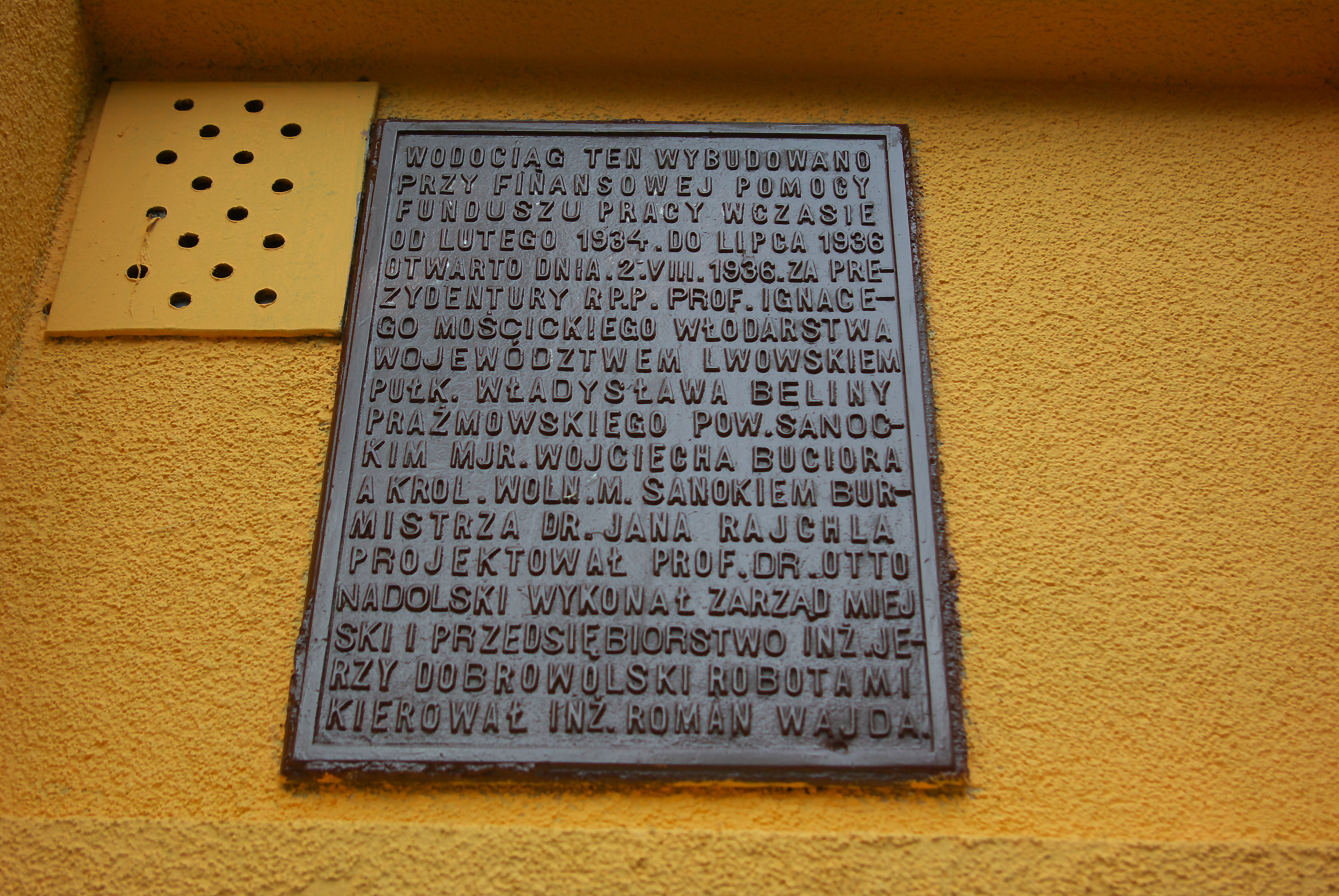
Plaque commemorating the creation of the municipal waterworks

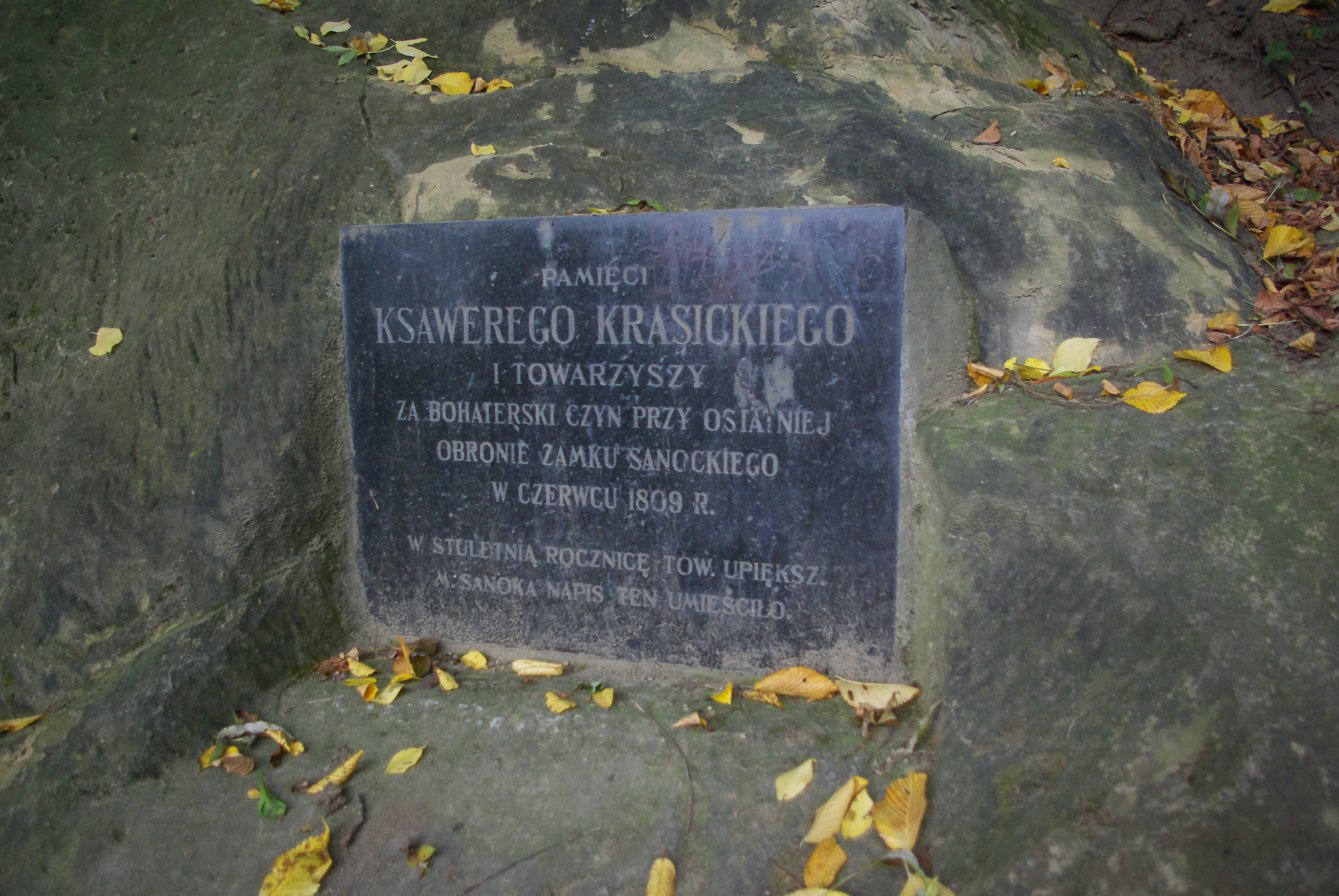
Plaque on the rock commemorating Ksawery Krasicki

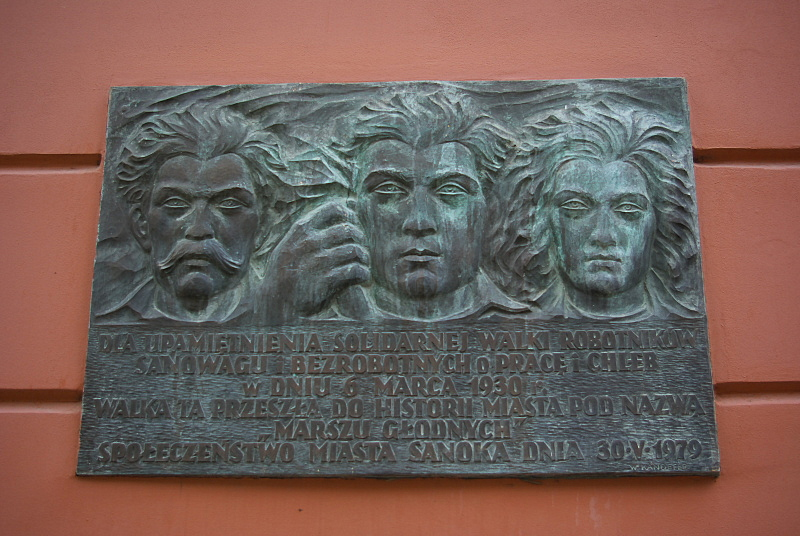
Plaque commemorating the Hunger March

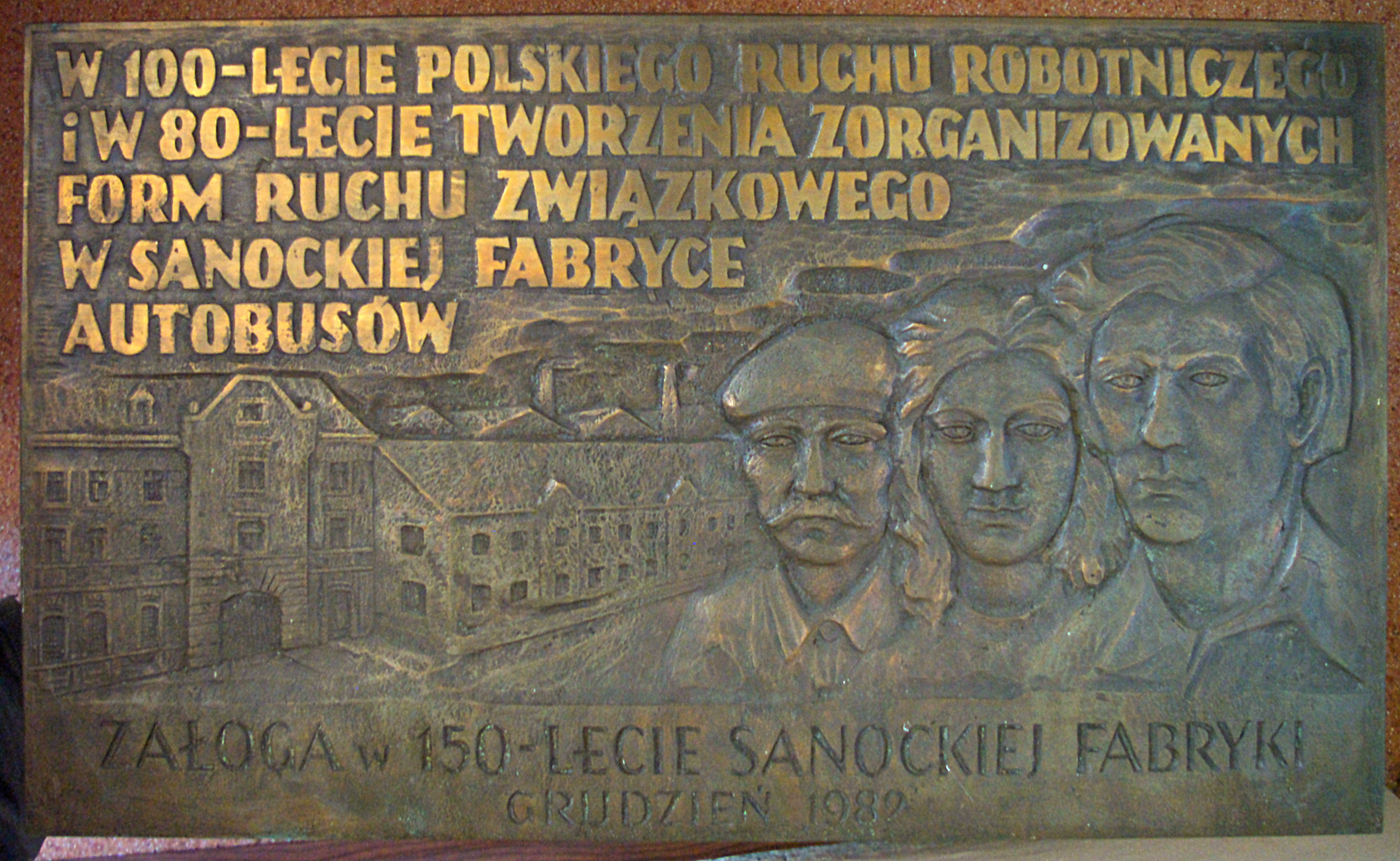
Commemorative plaque in Autosan

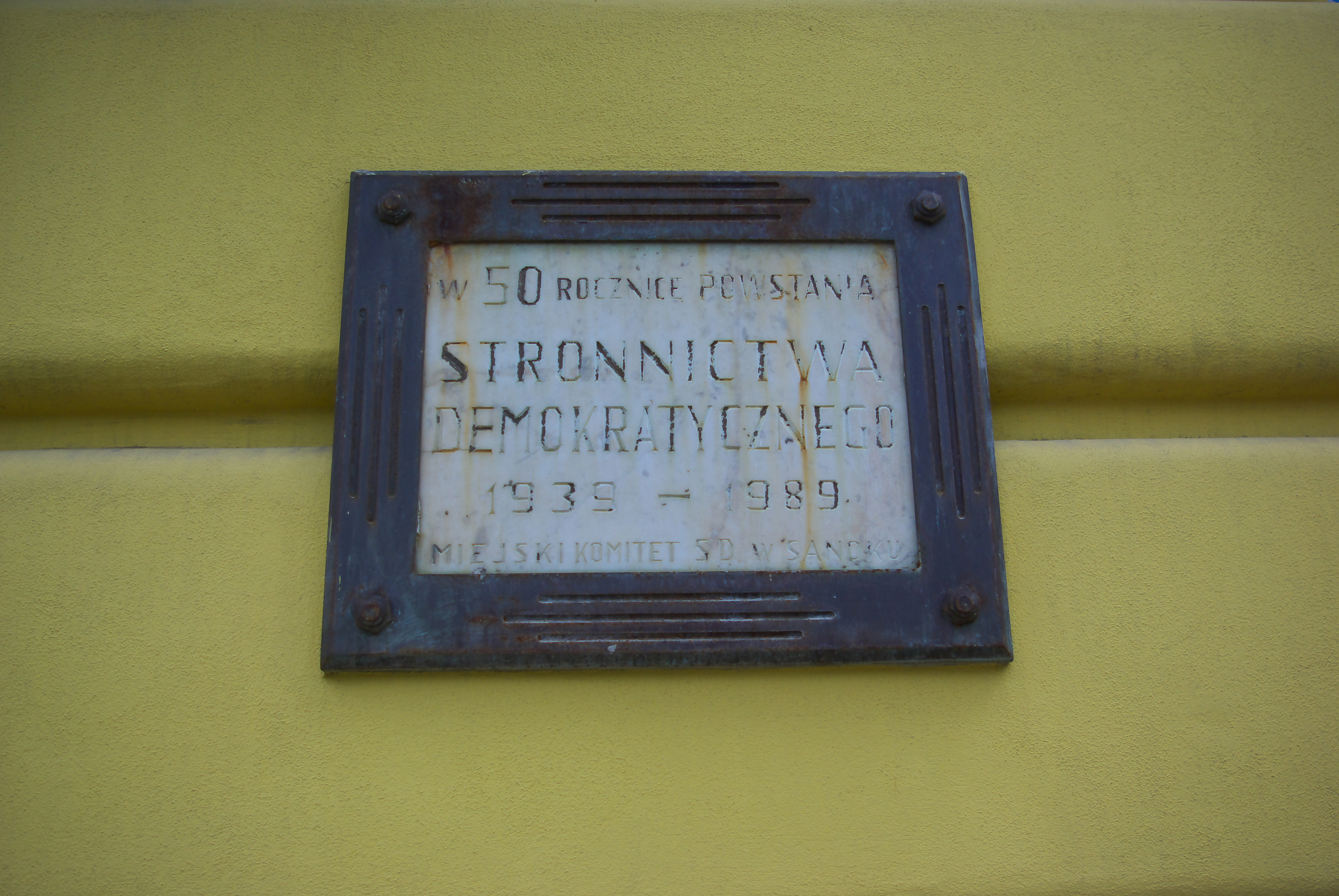
Plaque commemorating the Sanok Alliance of Democrats

Memorial plaque to Grzegorz Przemyk

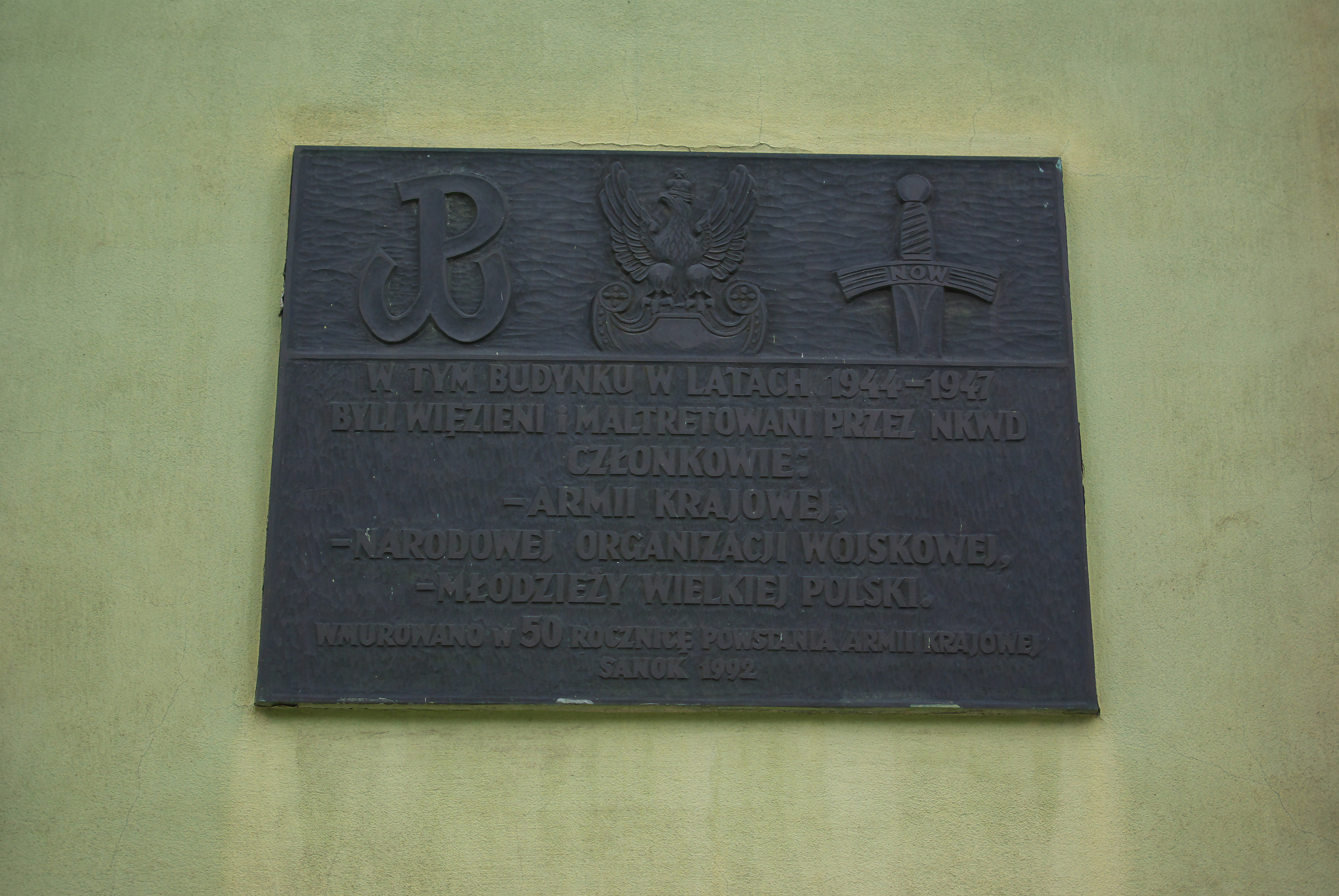
Plaque commemorating members of the Home Army, National Military Organization, and Youth of Greater Poland

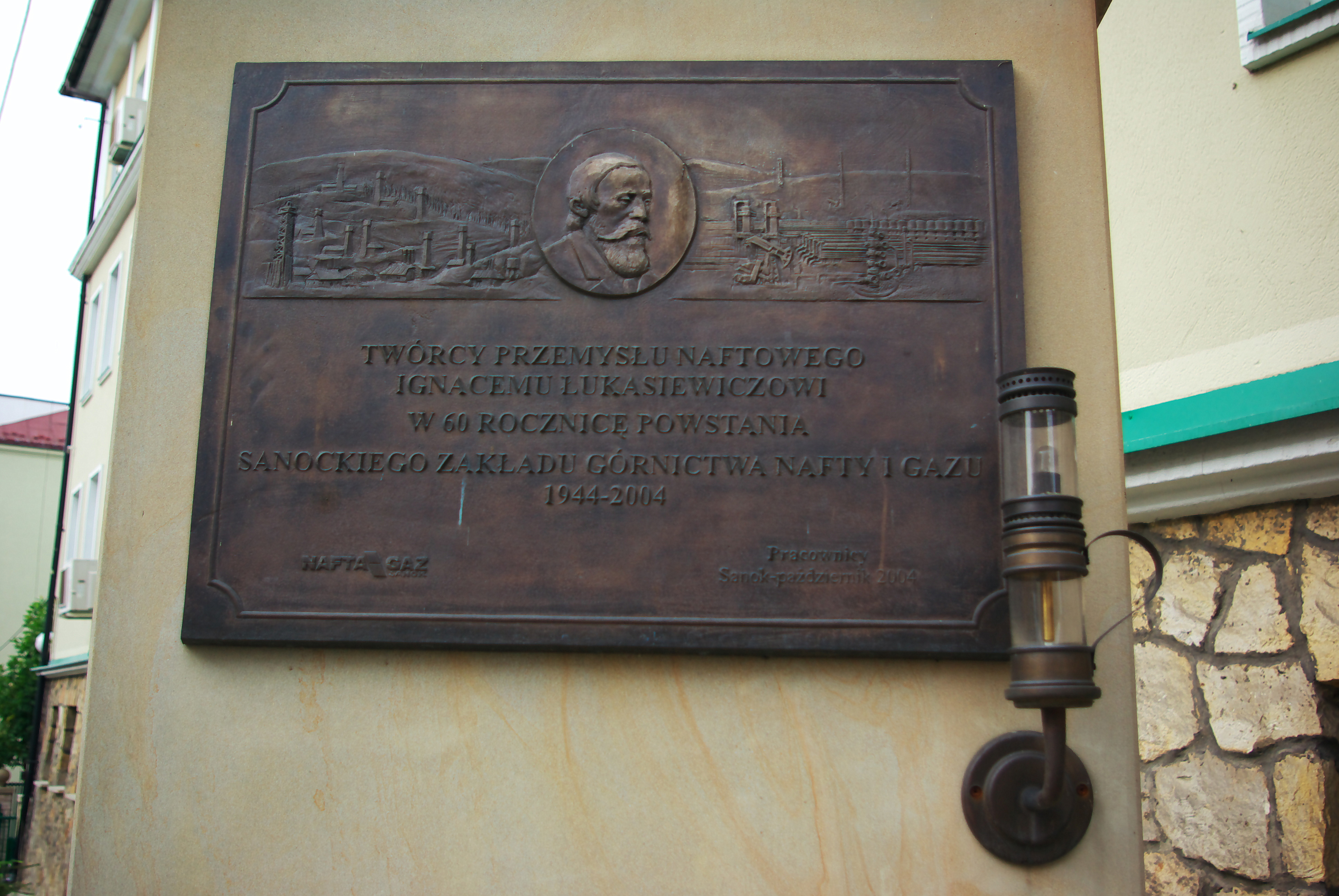
Plaque commemorating Łukasiewicz

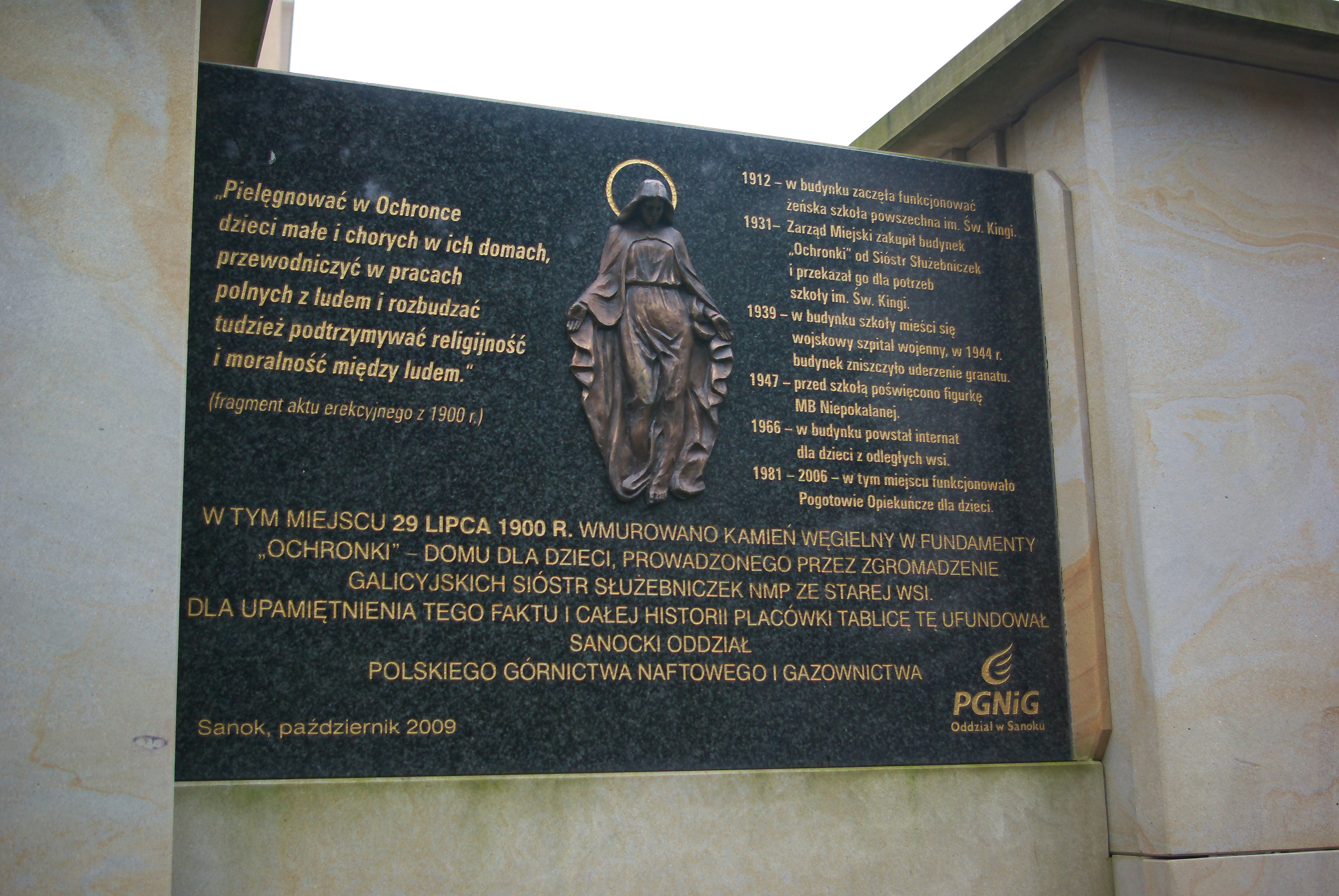
Plaque commemorating the orphanage near Władysław Sikorski Street

=== Churches ===
- Franciscan Church and monastery:
  - Plaque commemorating the funeral of 7 November 1758 and the joint burial of the bones of the deceased, noted as one of the oldest commemorative plaques in Sanok.
  - Stone plaque with an inscription commemorating the foundation of the church and the construction of an upper floor in the monastery buildings, established in 1847. It is located in the monastery, and the inscription reads: "The Monastery of the Reverend Fathers Minorites was founded by Władysław, Duke of Opole, Wieluń and Ruthenia, in the year 1387, where, after the church of the Missionary Fathers burned down in 1783, the parish was transferred. During the term of the Reverend Provincial Klemens Kobak, and through the efforts of the Reverend Guardian Paweł Gracowski, the upper-storey walls on the south and east sides were erected in 1847. A.M.D.G".
  - Epitaph of Maria Amalia Mniszech (1736–1772). The inscription reads: "To God, the Best and Greatest. Maria Amelia Mniszech, née Countess Brühl, General of Greater Poland. Died in the 36th year of her life, on the 30th of April, 1772, in Dukla. She asks for a Hail Mary".
  - Late Baroque epitaph of Jan Ignacy Lewicki (castellan of the Inflanty Voivodeship from 1769 to 1778, died 1788) and his wife Marcjanna née Tarnawiecka (died 1754). It is made of black marble and contains an inscription in Latin. The plaque was funded by their son, Samuel Rogala-Lewicki.
  - Epitaph with the inscription: "Resting in the Lord. Brother Hieronim Konopka, 18 August 1876 – 8 August 1944. He lived in the order for 46 years. Buried during the front". It is located by the church crypt.
  - Plaque commemorating the Union of Lublin from 1569. Established in 1869 on the 300th anniversary of the event. Noted as one of the oldest commemorative plaques in Sanok. The inscription reads: "Commemoration of the Union of Lublin 1869". The founder was the Sanok City Council. Originally, it was located on the "empty square" near the monastery, and after submitting an application, the City Council resolution of 15 June 1893 granted permission to move it to the front wall of the church.
  - Epitaph of Kazimierz Wiktor, made in 1908, with the inscription: "To Kazimierz Wiktor, owner of Zarszyn, born 1845 in Niebock, died 1903 in Kraków. To a faithful son of the homeland, beloved brother, from the landowners of Sanok 1908".
  - Plaque with the inscription: "To Our Lady of Consolation, on the 400th anniversary of her reign in the land of Sanok. A Tribute of Gratitude presented by the Franciscan Fathers and devotees. Sanok, 12 May 1996". Established during the 400th anniversary of the presence of the image of Our Lady of Consolation in the church. The plaque was unveiled on 12 May 1996 during a mass celebrated by Cardinal Józef Glemp.
  - Plaque with the inscription: "In memory of the 400th anniversary of the cult of Our Lady of Consolation. Gathered in the Sanok market square along with Józef Cardinal Glemp, Primate of Poland. The Franciscan Fathers and devotees of Our Lady of Consolation. Sanok, 12 May 1996". Placed on the facade by the entrance to the church.
- Church of the Transfiguration:
  - The tombstone of the Sanok starosta Sebastian Lubomirski from 1558, originally from the Church of St. Michael the Archangel (unearthed during archaeological works at St. Michael Square in 1892). Placed in its current location in 1953. The inscription reads: "Sebastian Lubomirski, Sanok starosta † 18 April 1558. Unearthed in 1892 at St. Michael's Square, where the parish church from the 14th century once stood. Burned down in 1782. Restored and placed here in 1953".
  - Epitaph dedicated to Father Franciszek Salezy Czaszyński (1811–1898), a keybenefactor of the church. The inscription reads: "D.O.M. To the late Father Franciszek Czaszyński. Born 1812, † 1898. To the parish priest and main benefactor of the church, grateful parishioners. R.I.P".
  - Epitaph dedicated to Zygmunt Kozłowski (1831–1893). Funded by the nobility of the Sanok Land. The inscription reads: "D.O.M. To Zygmunt Bolesław Kozłowski born 1 May 1831, † 9 October 1893. A longtime deputy of Sanok, the grateful nobility of this land. With courage and strength of soul, he fought to defend the rights of the church and the nation, leaving a worthy example for descendants to follow. Honor to his memory".
  - Commemorative plaque on the 500th anniversary of the victory in the Battle of Grunwald in 1410. The initiator was Ludwik Eydziatowicz, director of the Sanok Wagon Factory, and the plaque was made by Adam Lewanowicz. It was unveiled on 29 June 1910 or 15 July 1910. The inscription reads: "In memory of the 500th anniversary of the glorious victory of Polish arms at Grunwald 1410–1910".
  - Commemorative plaque with a bust of John III Sobieski, established on the 250th anniversary of the victory in the Battle of Vienna on 12 September 1683. It bears the inscription: "John III Sobieski, King of Poland 17.VII.1629–17.VI.1696. On the 250th anniversary of the victory at Vienna and the salvation of Christianity from the Turkish invasion".
  - Commemorative plaque dedicated to Józef Piłsudski (1867–1935). It features a quote from the Marshal's thoughts: "...To win and then rest on laurels – that is failure. / To be defeated and not surrender – that is victory". The main inscription reads: "Józef Piłsudski 1867–1935. Founder of the Legions, victorious commander in the 1920 war defending independence, outstanding statesman, the first marshal of the Republic of Poland. On the 50th anniversary of his death and the 65th anniversary of the victorious 1920 war. With deep respect, the people of Sanok. A.D. 1985". The plaque was consecrated and unveiled on 26 May 1985 by auxiliary bishop of Przemyśl, Tadeusz Błaszkiewicz. The ceremony was attended by the last living legionnaires. The designer and maker was Jerzy Bieda. An anonymous author (signed OB.W.) protested the plaque's establishment in an article titled In Whose Name? published in issue 19 of Gazeta Sanocka – Autosan from 1–10 July 1985. According to Father Adam Sudoł and Franciszek Oberc, the article was attributed to the newspaper's editor-in-chief, Wiesław Koszela.
  - The Golgotha of the East Cross in the form of a relief, commemorating the victims of the Katyn massacre. The memorial was established as part of the campaign titled "Golgotha of the East – Poland Remembers", initiated by the chaplain of the Katyn Families Federation, Father Zdzisław Peszkowski from Sanok, who had been a prisoner in the Kozelsk camp between 1939 and 1940 and survived the Katyn massacre. The initiative was undertaken on the 55th anniversary of the massacre by establishing the cross in 55 churches. At the center of the cross is an image of Our Lady of Katyn with rays spreading outward. Above the cross is the emblem of the Polish Armed Forces eagle. Below the eagle is the inscription "Katyn". The cross is draped with a sash bearing the words "Help forgive 1940", and at the base of the cross the other sites are listed: "Kozelsk, Ostashkov, Starobilsk", followed by the inscription "Golgotha of the East". The bas-relief measures 210 × 120 cm, was made of bronze at a foundry in Grudziądz, and was funded by the Independent Self-Governing Trade Union Solidarity, mentioned in the inscription beneath the cross. The cross was unveiled on 18 November 1995 and placed inside the church on the right pillar at the front of the main nave; during the Mass on that day, the homily was delivered by Father Peszkowski.
  - Plaque commemorating the soldiers of the Service for Poland's Victory-Union of Armed Struggle-Home Army Sanok District (Service for Poland's Victory-Home Army) and their commanders (Michał Tokarzewski-Karaszewicz, Tadeusz Komorowski, Leopold Okulicki), as well as the soldiers of the 2nd Podhale Rifles Regiment, which had been stationed in Sanok until 1939. The inscription reads: "To the soldiers of the Union of Armed Struggle-Home Army Sanok District (Service for Poland's Victory-Union of Armed Struggle) Home Army and their supreme commanders Gen. M. Tokarzewski Torwid, Gen. S. Rowecki Grot, Gen. T. Komorowski Bór, Gen. L. Okulicki Niedźwiadek. To the soldiers of the 2nd Podhale Rifles Regiment. On the 42nd anniversary of the departure of the partisan unit Południe. The People of the Land of Sanok. A.D. 1986". It was unveiled on 6 July 1986 by Edward Łabno, an officer of the prewar Sanok regiment, with participation by the Home Army chaplain, Prelate Jan Stączek. The plaque was initiated by Marian Witalis and Father Adam Sudoł. In issue no. 21 of Gazeta Sanocka – Autosan from 20–31 July 1986, in an article titled To Divide and Rule?!, the editor-in-chief, Wiesław Koszela, expressed opposition to the plaque's establishment.
  - Commemorative plaque dedicated to the activities of Solidarity from 1980 to 2005. The inscription reads: "Solidarity »Only a nation free in spirit and loving the truth can endure and create for the future« 1980 Sanok 2005 Podkarpacie Region". The author of the quote, not mentioned on the plaque, is Father Jerzy Popiełuszko (words from 25 September 1983). The plaque was initiated by Marian Witalis.
  - Plaque commemorating the founding of the Siberian Exiles Association in 1928, established on the 80th anniversary in 2008. The plaque features the organization's coat of arms and the inscription 1928 Sanok 2008. Below the plaque is a small plate with the text: "80th anniversary of the founding of the Siberian Exiles Association". It was unveiled during the Katyn Day on 13 April 2008.
  - Commemorative plaque for the first anniversary of the Smolensk air disaster of 10 April 2010. Funded by the Social Committee for the Commemoration of the Victims of the Smolensk Air Disaster. Consecrated on 9 April 2011.
- Plaque commemorating parishioners of the Church of the Sacred Heart – victims of World War II (they served in Union of Armed Struggle-Home Army, and the Home Army chaplain was Father Antoni Wołek Wacławski, codenamed Jurand). Unveiled in the 1960s in the vestibule of the church. The inscription reads: "In memory of the victims of World War II from the parish of the Sacred Heart in Sanok and Eternal rest grant them, Lord". The plaque lists 85 victims' names.
- Plaque at the Church of the Nativity of Mary commemorating the 25th anniversary of the parish. Unveiled on 8 September 1991. The inscription reads: "1966 – 8.IX.1991 Magnificat for the founding and 25 years of existence of the Sanok – Dąbrówka parish, offered to God by priests and the faithful".
- Plaque at the Church of Christ the King commemorating the soldiers of the 6th Pomeranian Infantry Division of the First Polish Army. It was unveiled on 15 May 1994 by General January Komański, Krosno Deputy Voivode Stanisław Jucha, Sanok Oil and Gas Mining Plant president Benedykt Oleksy, and former soldier of the unit Franciszek Harłacz. The initiator of the plaque was Captain Marian Jarosz. The designer was Władysław Kandefer. The inscription reads: "In memory of the soldiers from the Sanok Land of the 6th Pomeranian Infantry Division of the 1st Army of the Polish Army. To the fallen – who fought for the freedom and independence of the Fatherland. Veterans and society of the Sanok Land 1943–1994".
- Plaque at the St. Maximilian Kolbe Chapel dedicated to Grzegorz Przemyk (1964–1983). The initiators of its establishment were Father Adam Sudoł and Marian Witalis, who, together with Marian Kunc, installed it. It was funded by school youth and unveiled on 30 May 1987. The inscription contains a quote from Psalm 37:17 and reads: "... the arms of the wicked shall be broken, but the Lord upholds the righteous PS 37:17. To Grzegorz Przemyk, a victim of violence and injustice. Sanok May 1987. School youth". In issue 21 of Gazeta Sanocka – Autosan from 20–31 July 1987, in the article One More Plaque and One More Question: In Whose Name?, the editor-in-chief Wiesław Koszela expressed opposition to the establishment of the plaque.
- Plaque on the wall of the Small Synagogue. The inscription in Polish and Hebrew reads: "In this building until the time of the occupation was the synagogue of the Jewish inhabitants of Sanok. By a miracle, it was saved from destruction by the Nazi murderers". It was unveiled on 26 August 1991. The initiators of its placement were Sanok Jews living in Tel Aviv, Lea and Shamai Silberman and Jakub Gurfein.
Commemorative plaques in churches

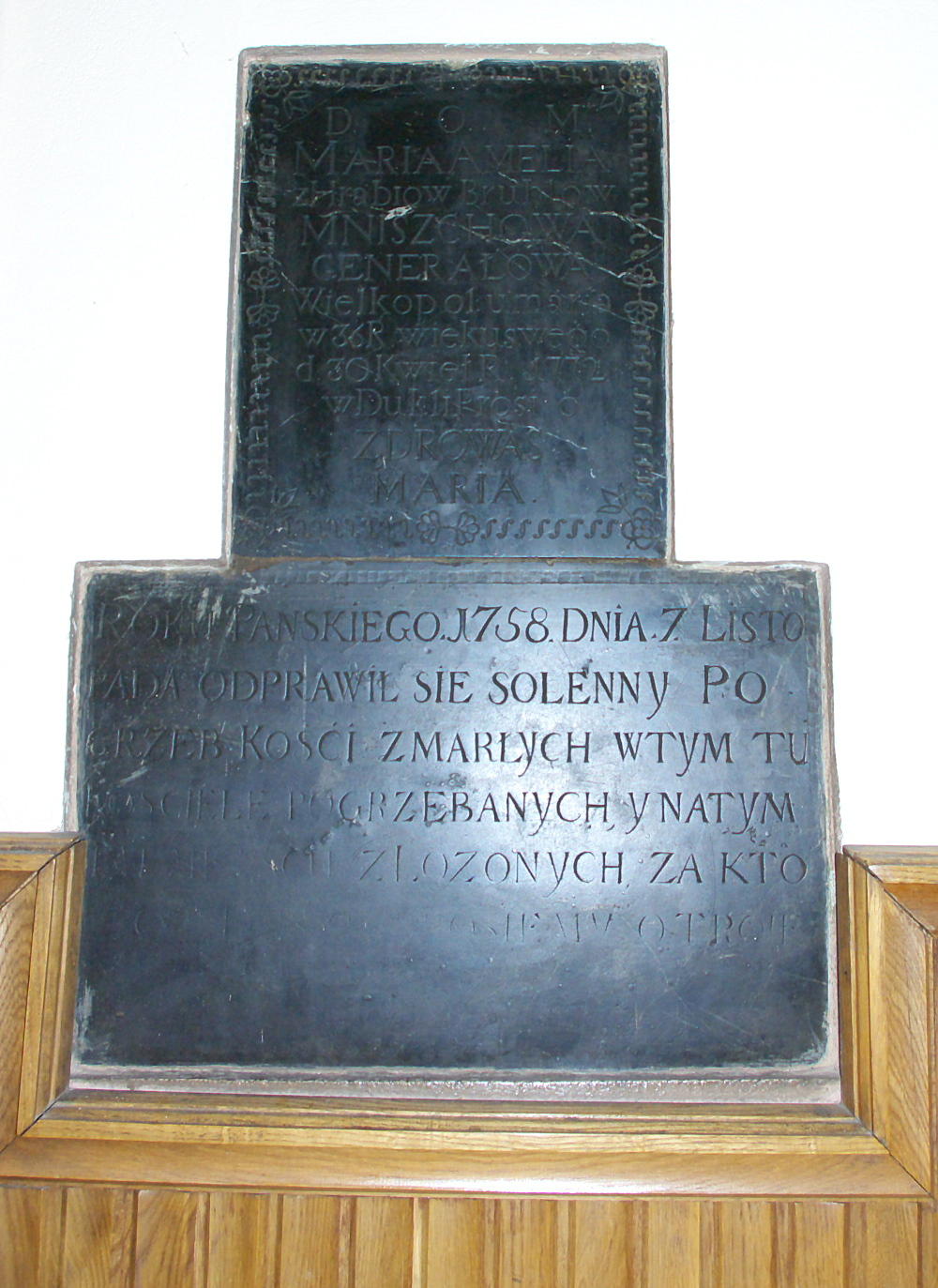
Oldest commemorative plaque in Sanok, located in the Franciscan Church

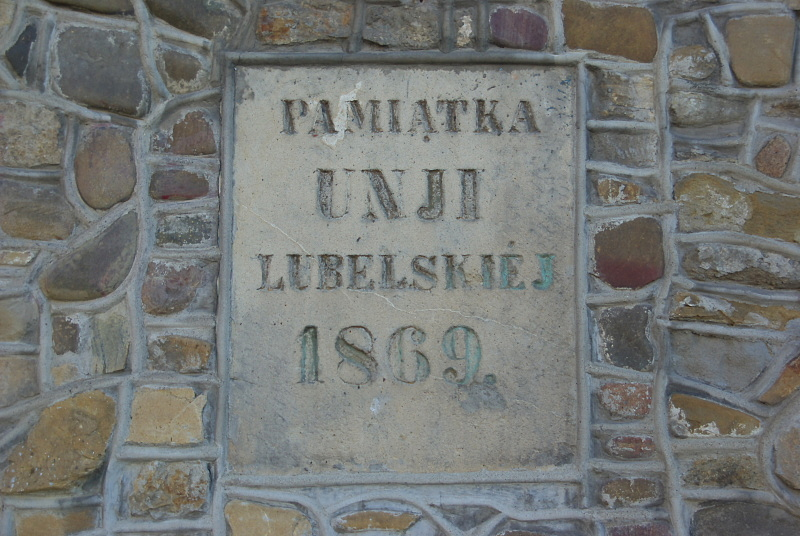
Commemorative plaque of the Union of Lublin on the Franciscan Church

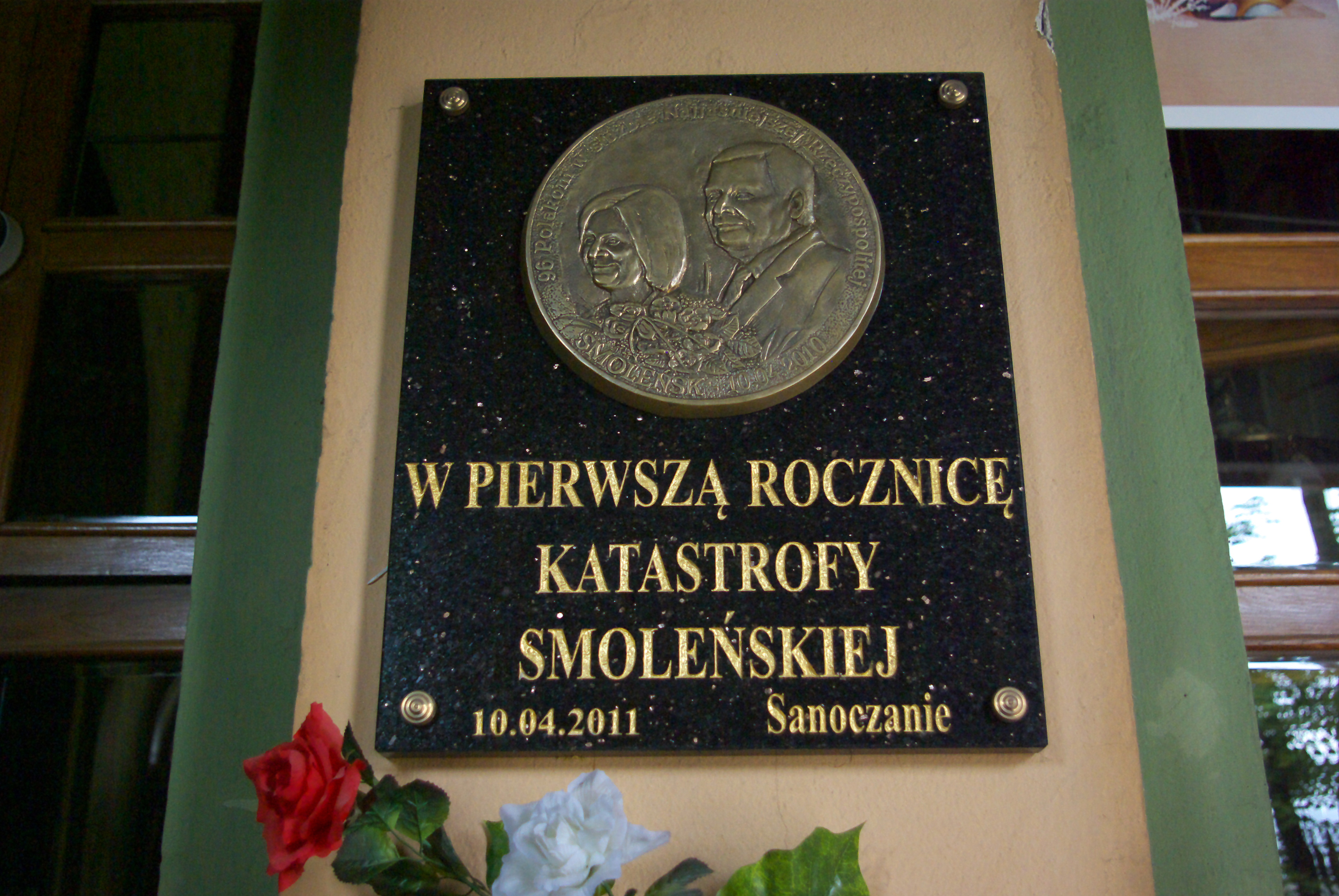
Commemorative plaque for the Smolensk air disaster in the parish church

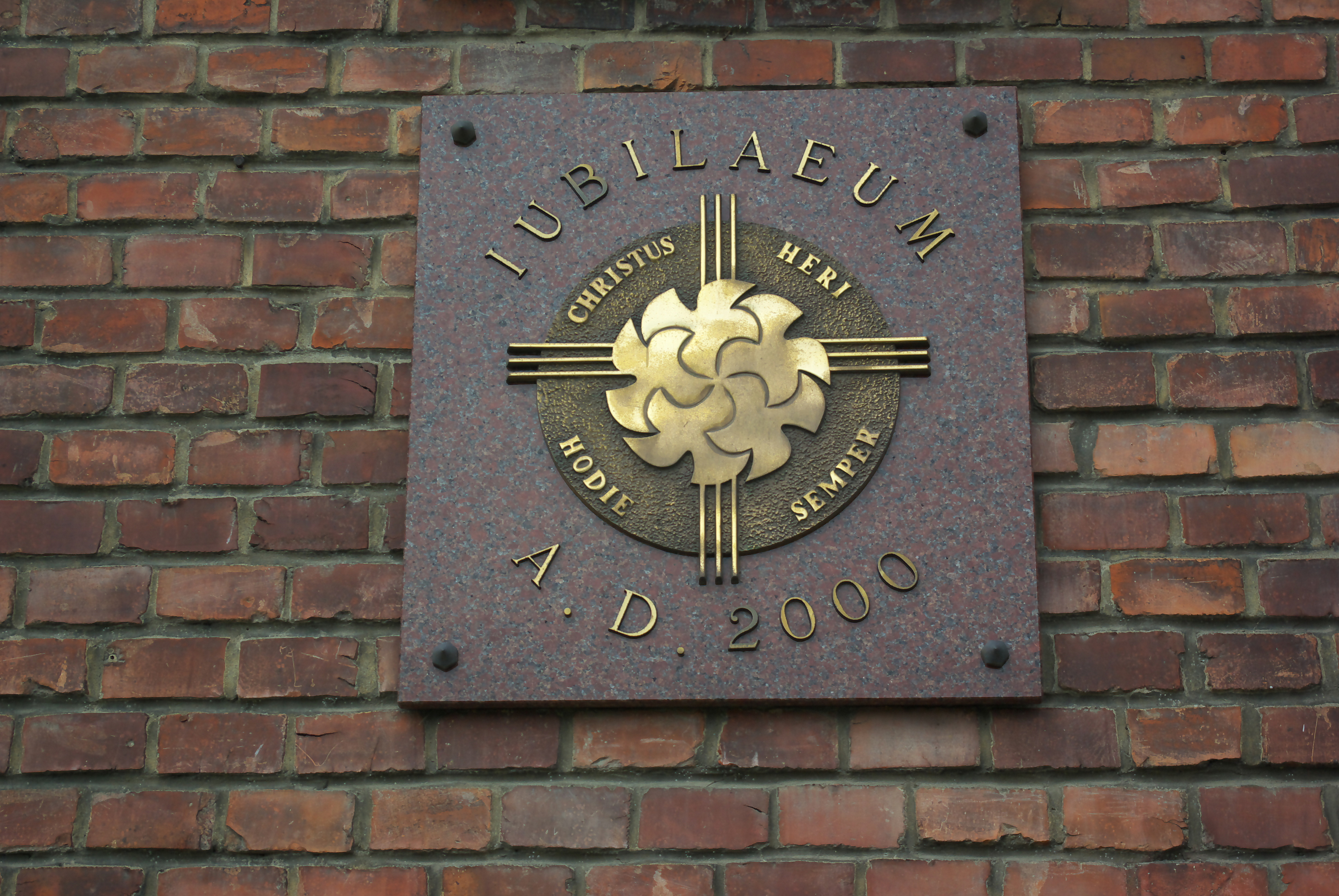
Commemorative plaque for the Jubilee Year 2000 (Church of the Sacred Heart)

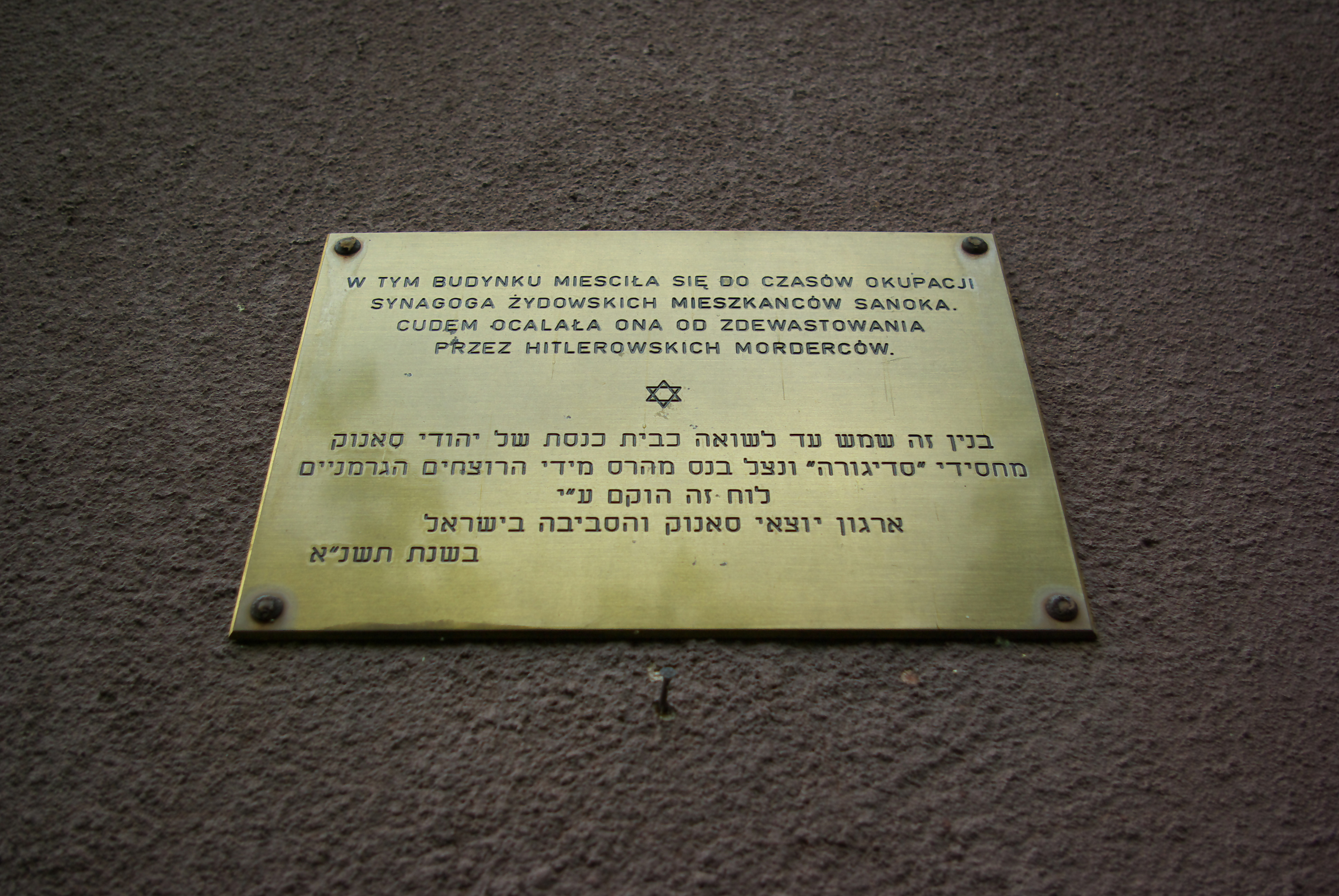
Plaque on the Small Synagogue

=== Schools ===
- Queen Zofia Secondary School at 5 John III Sobieski Street:
  - Plaque dedicated to alumni who died during wartime. It was unveiled on 21 June 1958 during the Jubilee Alumni Reunion of Former Students of the Men's Secondary School in Sanok on the 70th Anniversary of the First Matura Exam, by Professor Stefania Skwarczyńska. The design was created by Kazimierz Florek. The plaque commemorated the victims of the First and Second World Wars, the Polish-Bolshevik War of 1918–1920, and both Nazi and Soviet actions. The main plaque bears the inscription: "Mortui sunt – ut in libertate vivamus (They died so that we may live in freedom). To the educators and students of the Men's Secondary School in Sanok – heroes and martyrs who, during the two world wars, on battlefields, in prisons, concentration camps, and execution sites on Polish and foreign soil, gave their lives for their homeland. Jubilee Alumni Reunion 1888–1958". Two cardboard plaques listing over 200 victims' names were replaced during a ceremony on 11 June 1969 with bronze plaques (the committee was chaired by Jan Bezucha). During the school's renovation in summer 1973, the plaques were dismantled when the wall on which they were placed was demolished. At the end of August 1973, they were installed in the hall on the first floor of the new site of the successor school – the First General Secondary School named after the Commission of National Education at Zagrody Street. The plaques included the names of 24 victims of the Katyn massacre. On 3 September 1973, at the school year's inauguration, the Minister of Education and Upbringing Jerzy Kuberski viewed the inscriptions. Following this, pressure was exerted on the principal of the First General Secondary School, Tomasz Blecharczyk, to remove the plaques (this included efforts by city official Helena Grabowska). Eventually, in late August 1976, fearing for his position, Principal Blecharczyk ordered the removal of the plaques, which were altered: The previous entry "Executed by the Germans: a) on Polish soil (...) b) in Katyn" was changed by removing both subpoints "a)" and "b)". The previous entries "Died in the USSR" and "Died in Egypt" were replaced with "Died outside the country". The plaques were reinstalled on the wall and remained in that form at least until 1989.
  - Plaque commemorating teachers and students who died during both world wars, established on the occasion of the 70th anniversary of the first graduation exam held in 1958.
- Commission of National Education High School at Zagrody Street:
  - A plaque commemorating the 100th anniversary of the gymnasium with the inscription: "1380–1980 on the 600th anniversary of education in Sanok. 1880–1980 on the 100th anniversary of the Gymnasium and I Secondary School in Sanok. Committee of the Alumni Reunion".
  - A plaque commemorating the Commission of National Education from 1973. The inscription reads: 1773–1973. ...May our education prepare Polish youth to serve the Fatherland... – Hugo Kołłątaj. On the 200th anniversary of the founding of the Commission of National Education, the school building was given to the future builders of the People's Poland as a forge of knowledge and patriotism. Sanok 1973".
  - A commemorative plaque dedicated to Kazimierz Świtalski, unveiled on 18 April 2016.
- Maria Skłodowska-Curie High School at Adam Mickiewicz Street:
  - A plaque commemorating the Commission of National Education and Stanisław Konarski with the inscription: "1773–1928. To the creators of the educational commission on the 150th anniversary of the death of Father Stanisław Konarski, in honor and glory from the townspeople of Sanok". Unveiled in 1923. Funded by the society of Sanok.
  - Plaque commemorating Nicolaus Copernicus. Established on the 410th anniversary of his death (1543–1953). The inscription reads: "1543 1953. In tribute to the great Pole who stopped the Sun and moved the Earth, Nicolaus Copernicus, creator of modern astronomy, fighter for progressive human thought, this plaque was funded by youth on the 410th anniversary of his death". Unveiled in 1953, funded by youth.
  - Plaque commemorating Wojciech Słodkowski, co-creator of the Sanok journalism camps.
- Two commemorative plaques at the Karol Adamiecki School Complex (formerly the Economic Schools Complex) at 23 John III Sobieski Street. They mark the 50th anniversary of the school and its patron, Karol Adamiecki (both designed by Zbigniew Osenkowski):
  - The first bears the inscription: "1926 ZSE 1976. In commemoration of the 50th anniversary of the economic schools and the naming after Karol Adamiecki. Parents' Committee".
  - The second reads: "1915 ZSE 1995. In commemoration of the 70th anniversary of the economic schools. Alumni". The current status of this plaque is uncertain.
- Ignacy Łukasiewicz School Complex (formerly the Vocational Schools Complex) at 22 Jagiellońska Street houses two commemorative plaques dedicated to the institution and its patron:
  - One plaque, unveiled on 2 December 1993 and designed by Władysław Kandefer, marks the school's naming after Ignacy Łukasiewicz. Its inscription reads: "Vocational Schools Complex named after Ignacy Łukasiewicz in Sanok. The entire nation has counted his name among its best and most noble sons. – St. Brzozowski. Youth and teachers. Sanok, 2 December 1993". Above it, a circular portrait of Łukasiewicz bears the years of his life: 1822–1882.
  - A second plaque reads: "1970–1995. In commemoration of the 25th anniversary of the Vocational Schools Complex named after Ignacy Łukasiewicz. Grateful alumni, parents, teachers".
- Gregory of Sanok School Complex (formerly the Mechanical Schools Complex, named after Karol Świerczewski from 1976 to the early 1990s) at Stróżowska Street features two commemorative plaques in the main hall:
  - One plaque commemorates the school's patron, Gregory of Sanok, and reads: "Gregory of Sanok 1406–1477. Humanist, poet, and Archbishop of Lviv, patron of the Mechanical Schools Complex in Sanok. Teachers, students, parents. 12 November 1996". It was unveiled during the school's 50th anniversary and designed by Waldemar Rokowski.
  - The second plaque reads: "In commemoration of the 50th anniversary of the founding of the Mechanical Schools in Sanok 1946–1996. Alumni. Sanok, 14–15 June 1997". It was created for the alumni reunion of the Mechanical Technical School and designed and executed by Stanisław Czajka. The plaque was blessed by Father Kazimierz Pszon.
- King Casimir the Great School Complex (formerly the Construction Schools Complex) at 21 Sadowa Street features a commemorative plaque marking the 30th anniversary of the school's founding. The plaque reads: "1969–1999 ZSB XXX-lecie. Trzeba ziemię garściami rwać, / ruinie wydzierać cegły / dom budować i sercem trwać / w Niepodległej. To commemorate the 30th anniversary of the school – the first graduates. Sanok, 11 September 1999". The plaque was unveiled during the school's 30th anniversary.
- St. Kinga Primary School at Rymanowska Street:
  - Commemorative plaque marking the school's founding in 1966, built for the Millennium of the Polish State and funded by the crew of the Sanok Bus Factory. It features an image of the Eagle (without a crown) and the inscription: "School – Monument to the Millennium of the Polish State. Year 1966. Founder – staff of the Sanok Bus Factory".
  - Commemorative plaque with a bas-relief of Kinga of Poland. The inscription quotes John Paul II: "She was able to meet the challenges of the moment. Jan Paweł II, 16.06.1999, Nowy Sącz". A small plaque below states: "Founder Father Rudolf Zubik".
- Plaque commemorating Tadeusz Kościuszko, located in the building of Tadeusz Kościuszko Primary School No. 3 at Stróżowska Street, operating under his patronage since the early 20th century, as No. 3 since 1957, and at Stróżowska Street since 1983. The plaque was made at the Autosan factory. The inscription reads: "1746–1817. Tadeusz Kościuszko, patron of our school. Oh, Kościuszko, beautiful example / How to love the homeland / At every moment of life, / We desire to follow you. Sanok 1986. Parents and youth".
- Commemorative plaque on the building of Father Zdzisław Jastrzębiec Peszkowski Primary School, commemorating Father Zdzisław Peszkowski. It was unveiled on the first anniversary of his death.
Commemorative plaques in schools

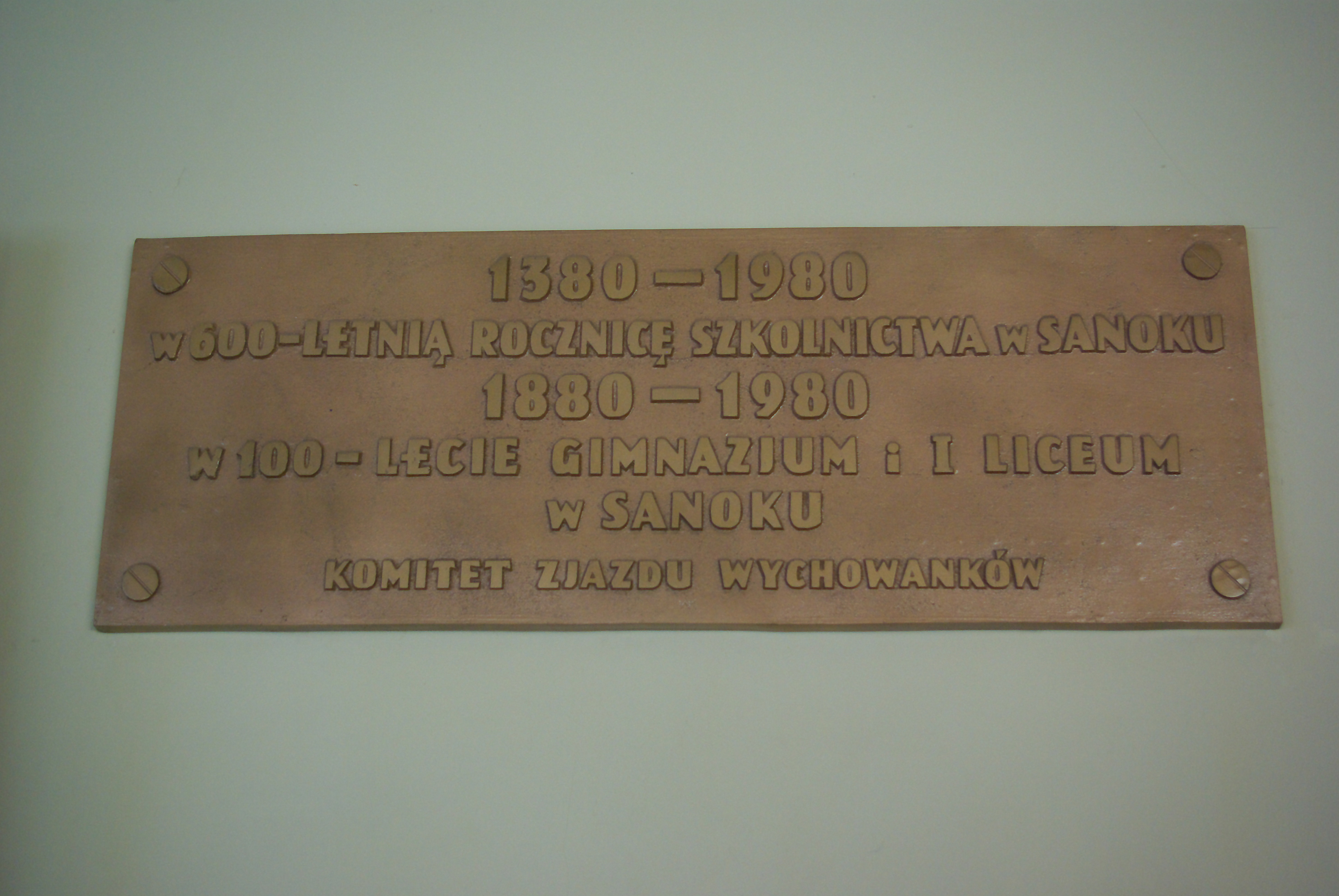
Commemorative plaque dedicated to Gymnasium No. 2 and First General High School

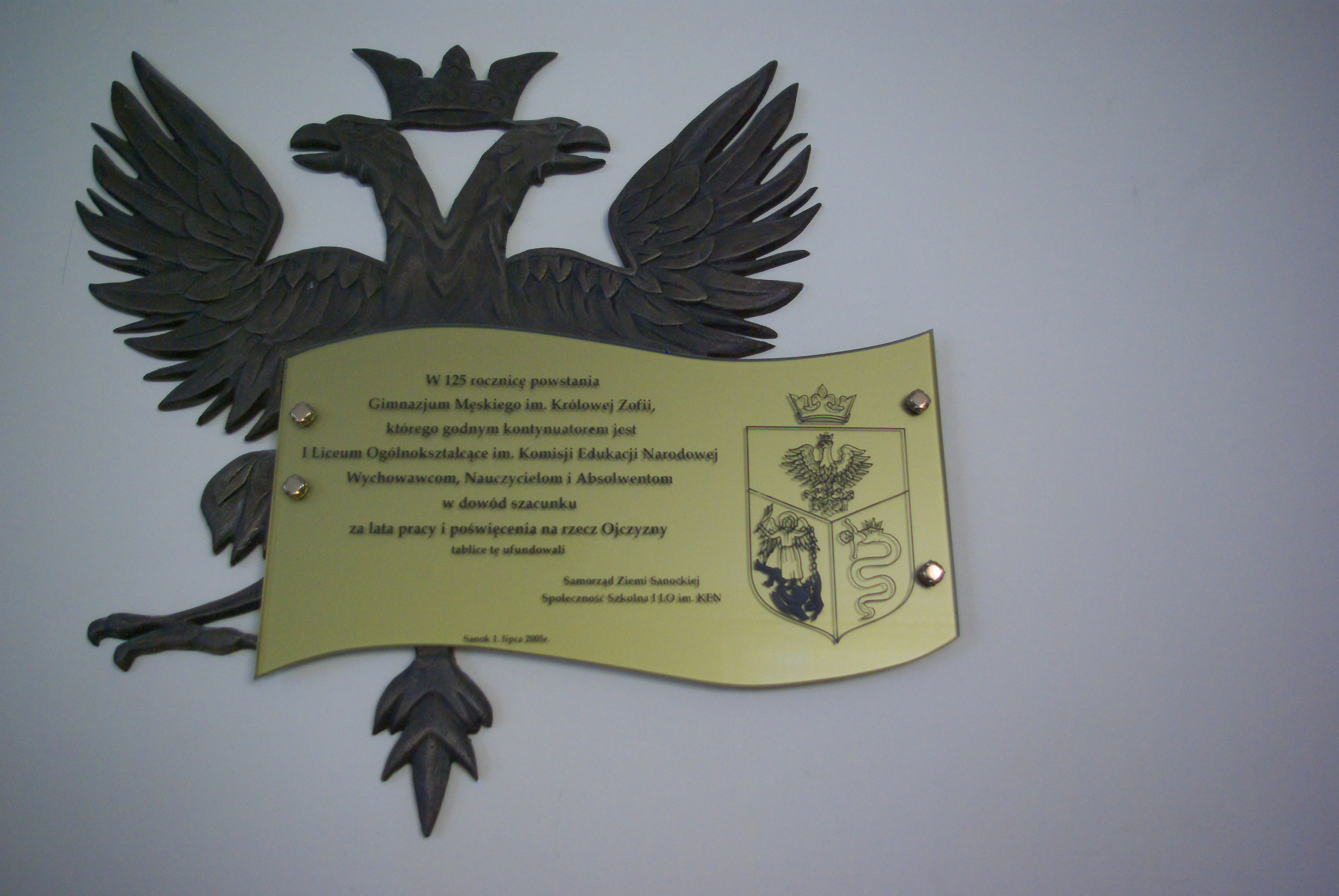
Commemorative plaque at the First General High School from 2005

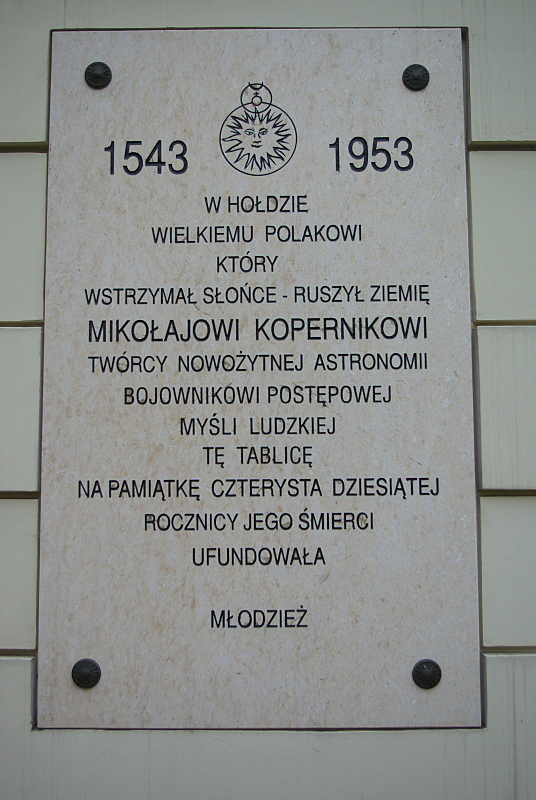
Plaque in tribute to Nicolaus Copernicus on the façade of the Second General High School

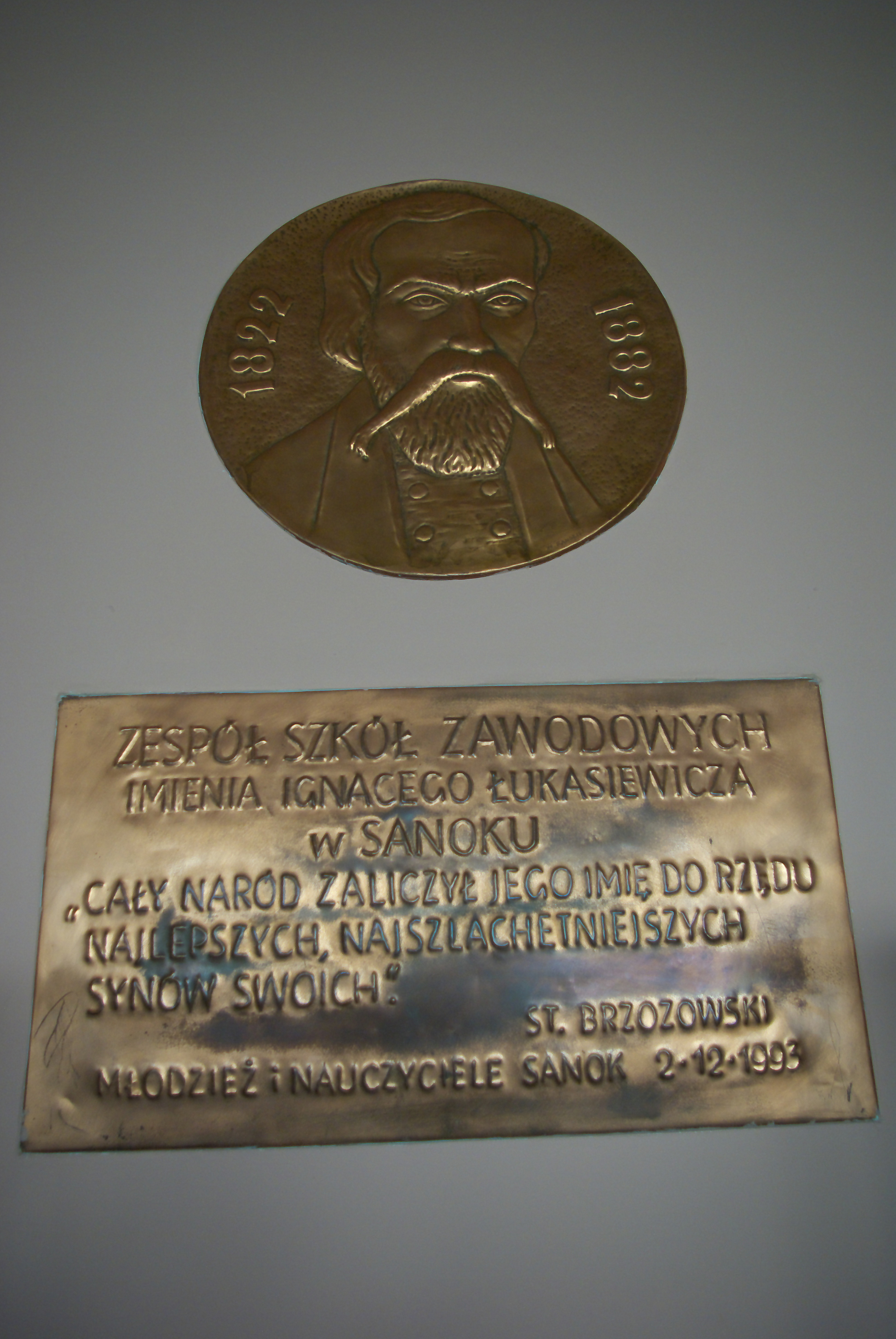
Plaque commemorating Ignacy Łukasiewicz, patron of School Complex No. 5

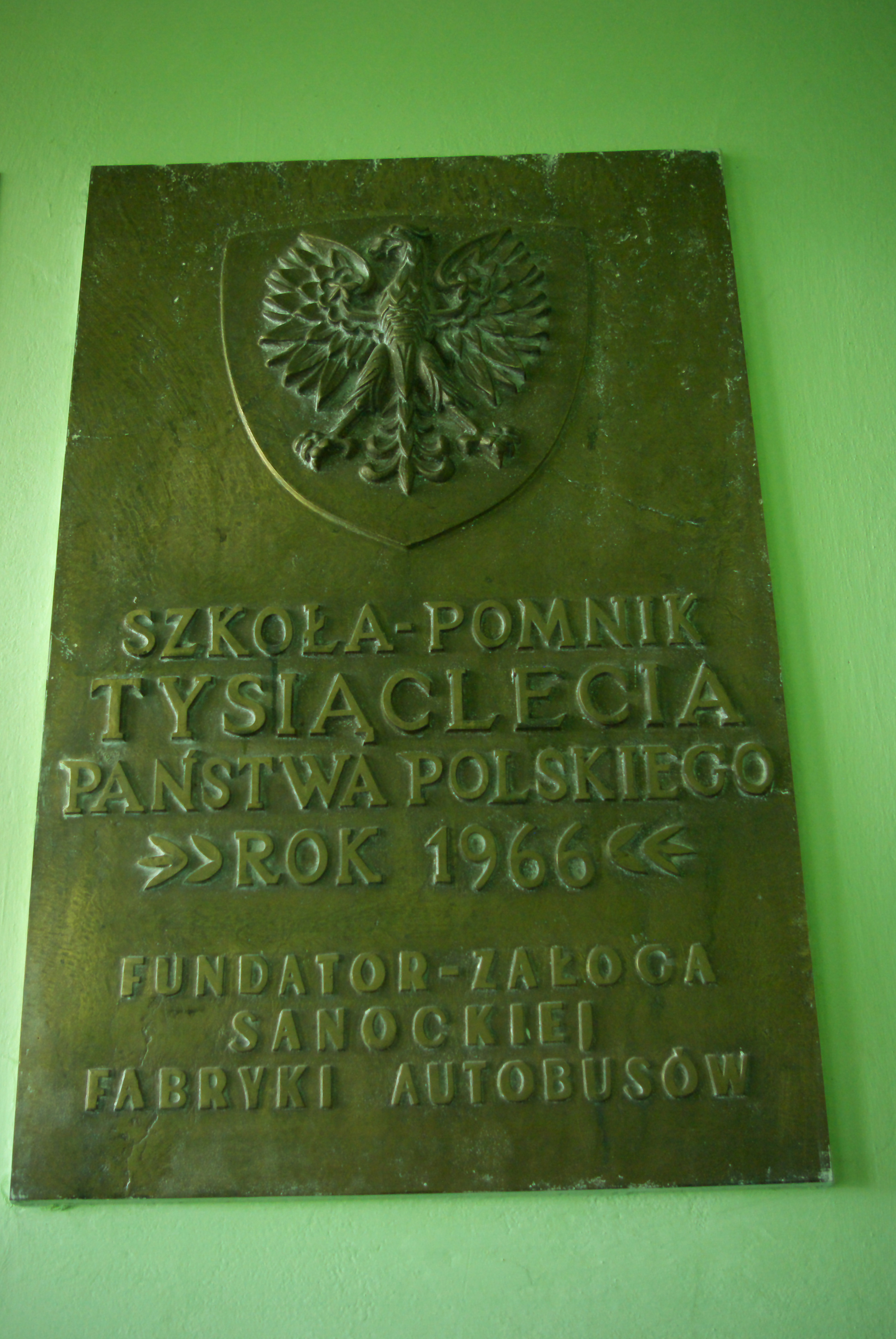
Plaque commemorating the construction of Primary School No. 2

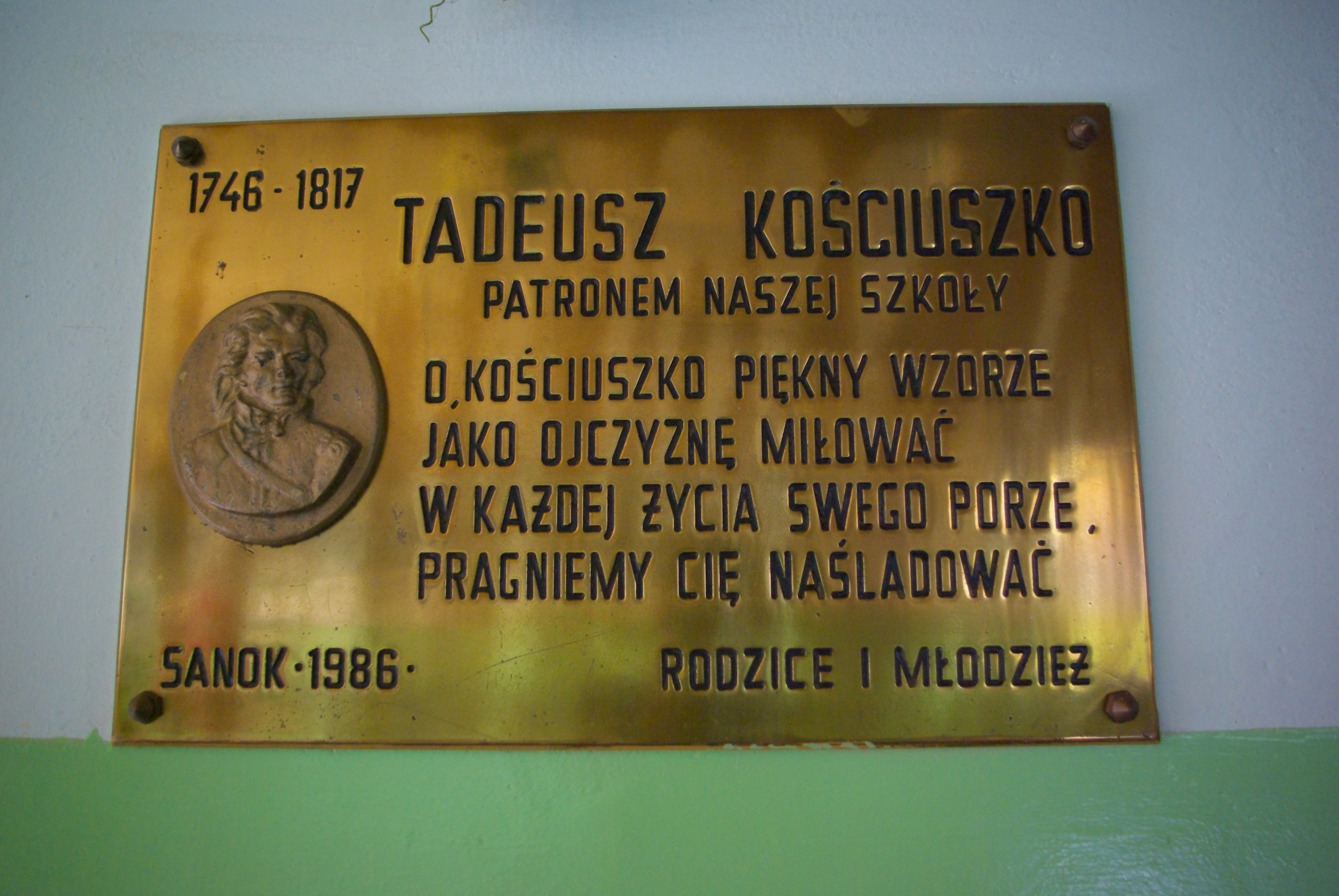
Plaque commemorating Tadeusz Kościuszko, patron of Primary School No. 3

=== Former commemorative plaques ===
- Commemorative plaques established during the renaming of streets: Zielona Street to John III Sobieski Street (established 12 September 1883), Nowej Rady Street to 3 Maja Street (1891), Krakowska Street to Tadeusz Kościuszko Street (1894, placed on the municipal building at number 86).
- Plaque in the Sanok Historical Museum on the castle wall, where the museum was originally located. The inscription read: "In this building, part of the former Sanok castle erected by King Casimir the Great in the mid-14th century, known for the wedding celebrations of King Władysław Jagiełło on 2 May 1417, rebuilt during the reign of King Sigismund the Old by his wife Bona Sforza in the 16th century, the Sanok Land Museum was established through the efforts of the Society of Friends of the Sanok Land in 1934". It was destroyed by the German occupiers in 1940, and its remains were used in the construction of a bunker on the nearby slope.
- Karol Świerczewski plaques:
  - A plaque at the former Primary School No. 4.
  - Plaque on the corner of the facade of the tenement house at 8 Kazimierz Wielki Street commemorating General Karol Świerczewski, who spent the last night of his life in the building on 27/28 March 1947, after which he went to inspect the Border Protection Troops post in Cisna and was killed on 28 March 1947 in a skirmish with partisan units of the Ukrainian Insurgent Army near Jabłonki by Baligród. It was unveiled on 27 March 1953, on the eve of the sixth anniversary of the general's death. It bore the inscription: "To the revolutionary, faithful son of the party and the Polish nation, General Walter Karol Świerczewski, who on the eve of his heroic death stayed in this house on 27 March 1947. The community of the Sanok Land". The design was by Kazimierz Florek, and the sculpture in black marble was made by Karol Łotek. The plaque was removed in 1993.
  - Plaque in the former Mechanical School Complex (now Gregory of Sanok School Complex; formerly at 15 Włodzimierz Lenin Street, now at 15 Stróżowska Street), dedicated to Karol Świerczewski. It was unveiled on 28 March 1977 on the 30th anniversary of the general's death, and the unveiling was performed by his daughter Antonina. The plaque was removed in 1989.
- Plaque on the building at 5 Henryk Sienkiewicz Street, dedicated to the officers of the Security Service and the Citizens' Militia. It was unveiled on 11 October 1969 (during an event marking the 25th anniversary of the Polish People's Republic) at the then seat of the County Command of the Citizens' Militia, and the donors were members of the Society of Fighters for Freedom and Democracy at the County Command of the Citizens' Militia in Sanok. The inscription read: "1944–1969 To those who died fighting to consolidate the people's power – officers of the Citizens' Militia and the Security Service", below which 34 names were listed, followed by the signature: "25th anniversary of Polish People's Republic, society".
- Plaque in the former Primary School No. 7, existing from 1975 to 1999 (currently Primary School No. 9; formerly at 1 Długa Street, now 25 John Paul II Street). Placed to commemorate the opening of the facility on 1 September 1975. The inscription read: "1945–1975. On the 30th anniversary of victory over fascism, this school building was handed over to the future builders of People's Poland; to honor the military deed of the Polish soldier, this school was named after the 6th Pomeranian Airborne Division. Sanok, 1 September 1975". The plaque unveiling on the school's inauguration day was conducted by the first secretary of the Provincial Committee of the Polish United Workers' Party Kazimierz Balawajder and the Krosno voivode Wojciech Grochala.
- Plaque in the former Construction School Complex (currently King Casimir the Great School Complex No. 4), dedicated to Jan Krasicki. It was unveiled on 5 October 1987 during the naming of the school's new patron; a bust was also unveiled, both funded by the Sanok Construction Company. It was removed in 1990.
- A commemorative plaster plaque of Solidarity established on 31 August 1983 in the Church of the Transfiguration. Removed immediately after the mass on the same day.
- A plaque dedicated to Father Jerzy Popiełuszko. On 19 October 1986, it was handed over by a delegation of Sanok's Solidarity to Father Teofil Bogucki, the parish priest of St. Stanislaus Kostka Church in Warsaw, where it was later installed. The donors were Tadeusz Gacek and Marian Witalis. The plaque was subsequently embedded in the Church of St. Stanislaus Kostka.
- A plaque commemorating Bolesław Bogaczewicz, the initiator of the construction of tennis courts in Sanok, installed at the headquarters of the Sanok Tennis Club on Adam Mickiewicz Street.

=== Plaques along the trails of notable people ===
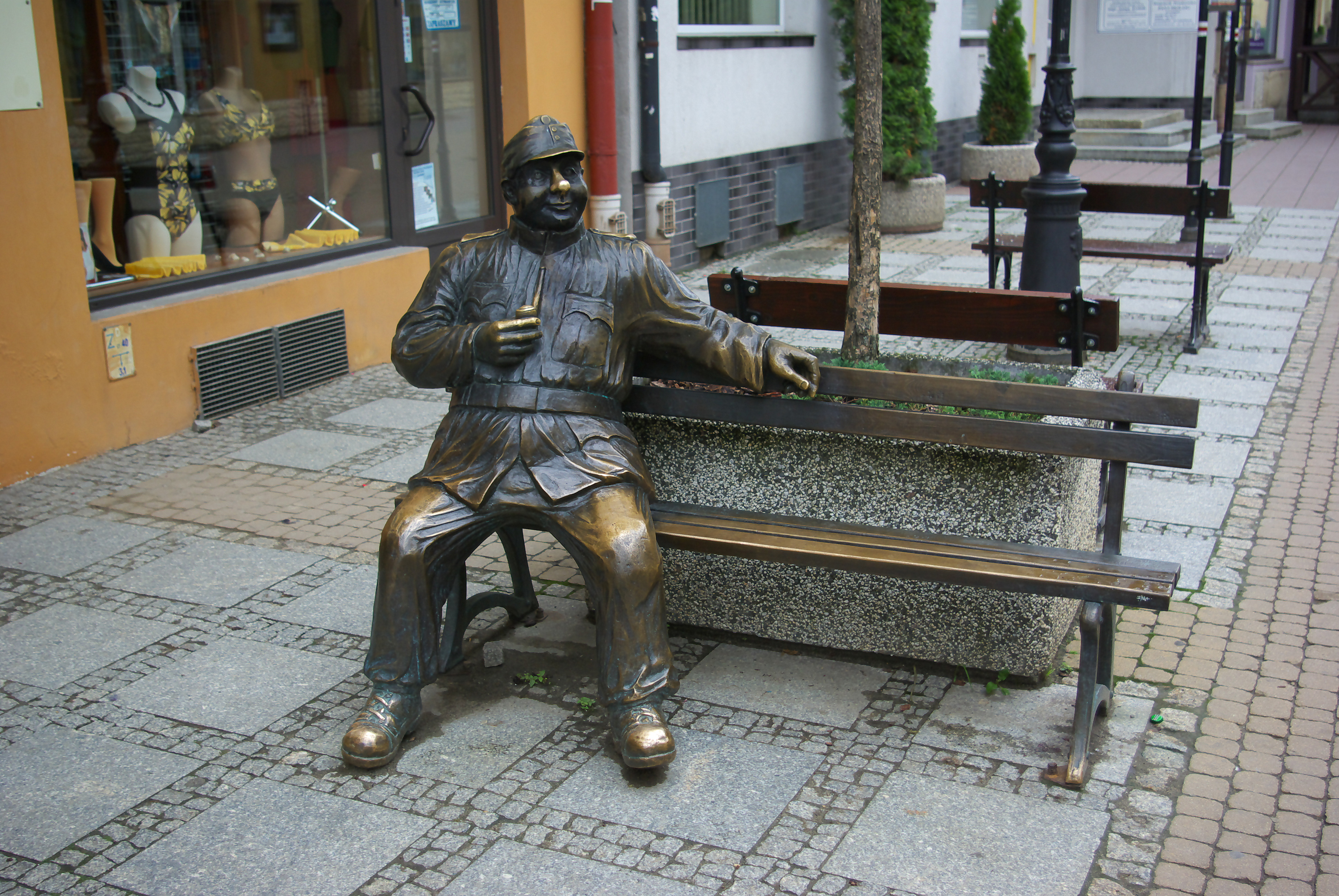
Good Soldier Švejk bench

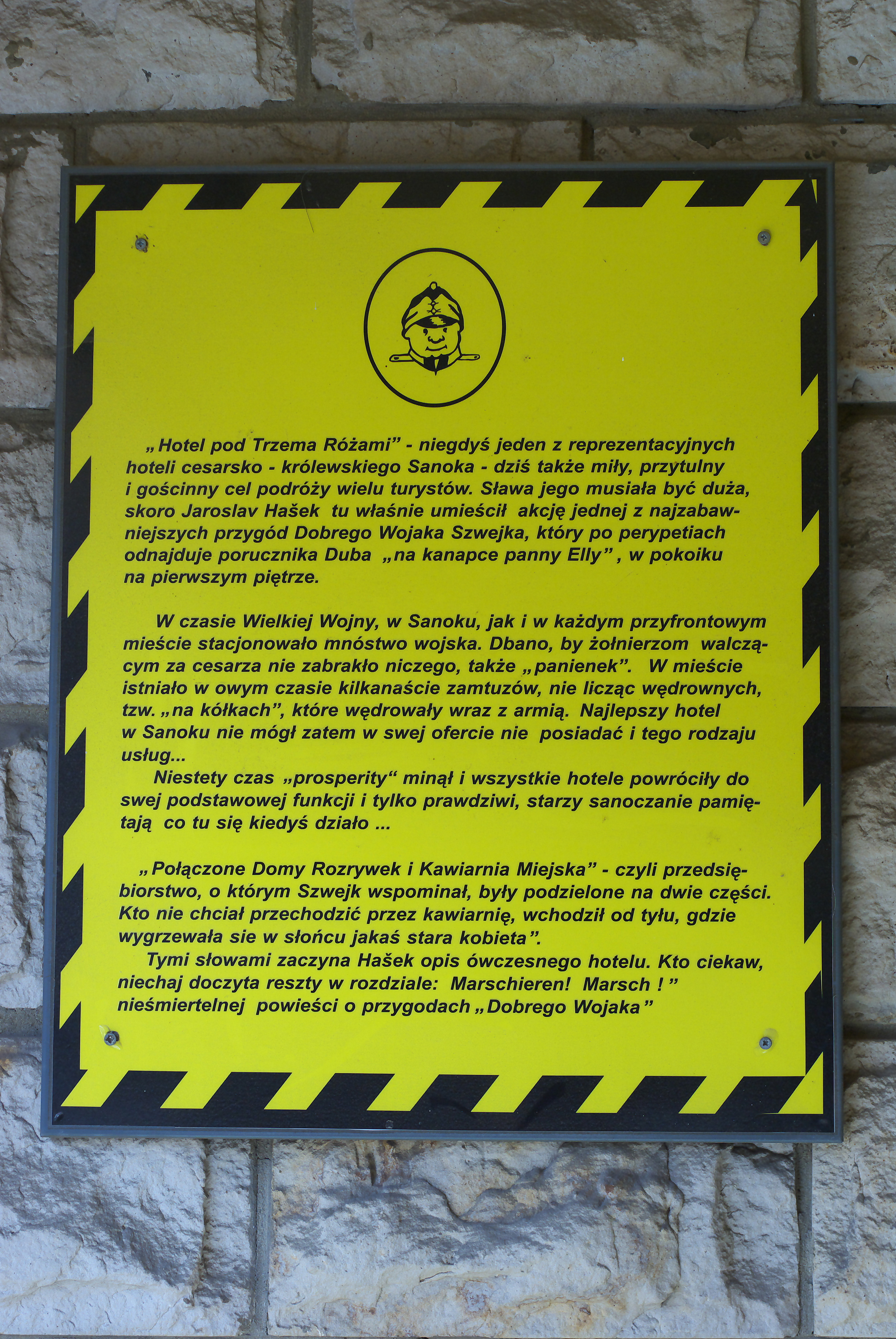
Information plaque on the Trail Following the Good Soldier Švejk

Originally in 1991, a branch of Tadeusz Kościuszko Street was named Josef Švejk Alley and marked with two plaques. Later, the "Trail Following the Good Soldier Švejk" was created, featuring informational and plaques in Sanok that commemorate Josef Švejk's stay in the city, as described in the book The Good Soldier Švejk by Jaroslav Hašek.

On the initiative of Sabina Pelc-Szuryn, on 1 October 2011 a walking trail called "Following the Beksiński Family" was opened in Sanok, running through places connected with the Beksiński family. 11 plaques along the route inform about the achievements of family members, including Mateusz Beksiński (1814–1886), Władysław Beksiński (1850–1929), Zdzisław Beksiński (1929–2005), and Tomasz Beksiński (1958–1999). The plaques are designed as artist's easels, reflecting Zdzisław Beksiński's work and the artistic professions of other family members.

On 11 November 2013, scouts from the Sanok Land Scout Group placed an informational plaque commemorating Father Zdzisław Peszkowski on the building at 10 Jagiellońska Street, where his parents once ran a confectionery.

== Benches ==
On the Sanok market square, in front of the tenement house at 14 Rynek Street, there are two benches with plaques commemorating writers from Sanok:

- A bench with a plaque commemorating Kalman Segal (1917–1980), unveiled in October 2007.
- A bench with a plaque commemorating Marian Pankowski (1919–2011), unveiled on 9 November 2011, on the 90th anniversary of his birth, by his sister-in-law, Jadwiga.

== Chapels and shrines ==
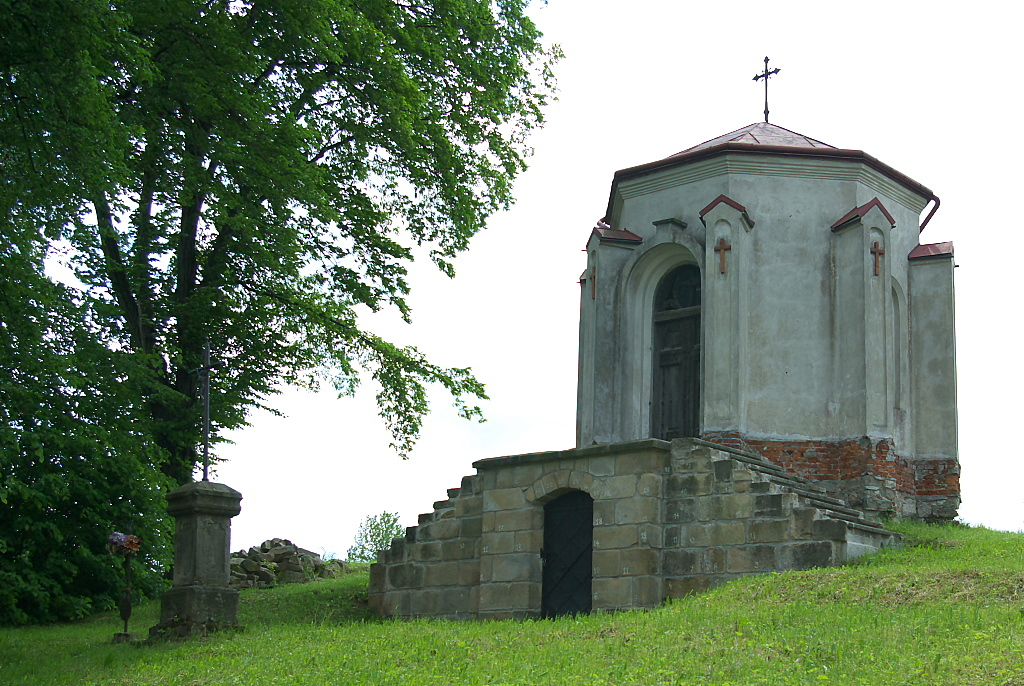
- Tchorznicki, Stankiewicz and Urbański family tomb chapel
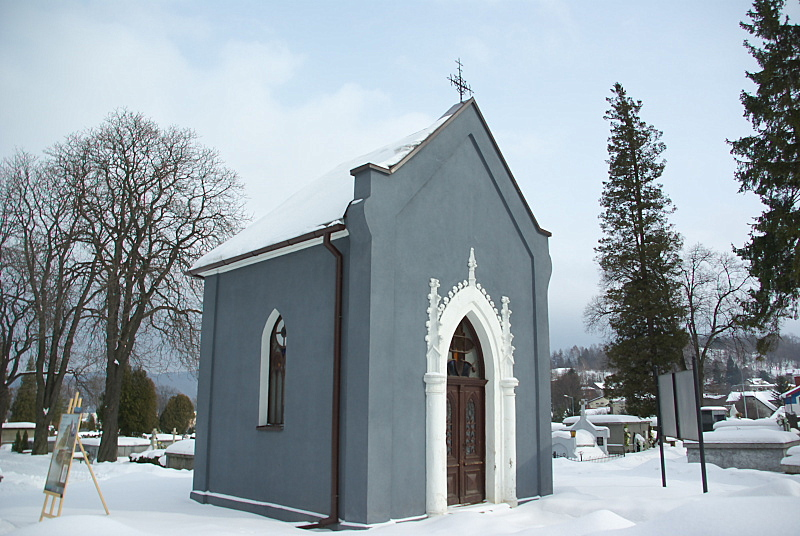
  Funeral chapel at the Central Cemetery
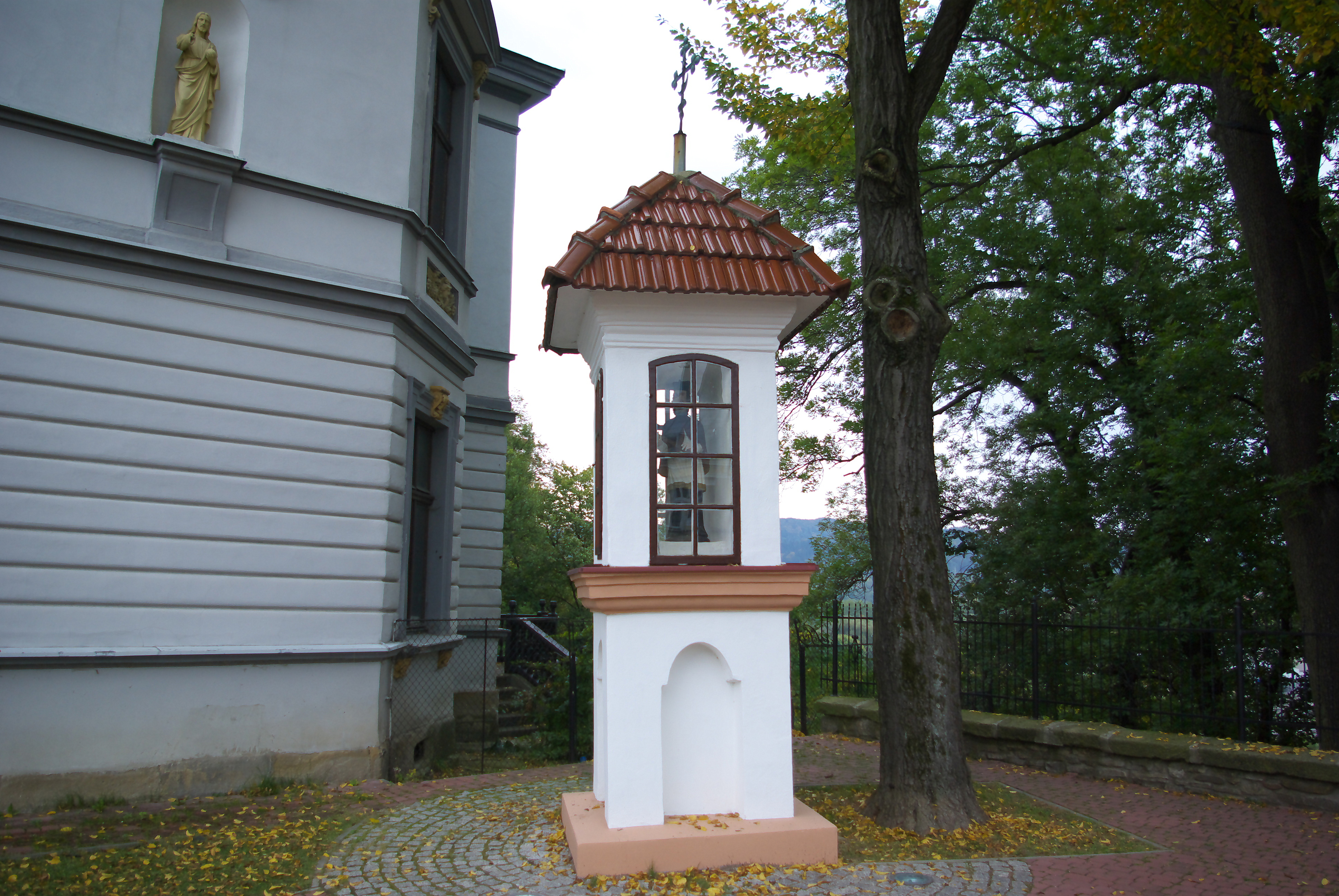
  Shrine of Saint John of Nepomuk
  Tchorznicki, Stankiewicz and Urbański family tomb chapel on Aleja Najświętszej Marii Panny Street in Dąbrówka, located above the St. Demetrius Church and the Church of the Nativity of the Blessed Virgin Mary. It was designated a historic monument (A-211 of 6 August 2007).
- The above-mentioned Tchorznicki, Stankiewicz and Urbański family tomb chapel, as well as the roadside shrines (three along the Załuż–Sanok road and one along the Dąbrówka–Sanok road), and the chapel at 23 Kazimierz Lipiński Street, were included in the updated register of Sanok's historic monuments in 1972. In the municipal register of historic monuments of the city of Sanok, published in 2015, the shrines at 23 Kazimierz Lipiński Street and 91 Przemyska Street were listed.
- Funeral chapel (no longer in use) at the Central Cemetery on Rymanowska Street. The design was created by Władysław Beksiński, who also authored the layout of the entire cemetery. It is built in the Gothic Revival style, on a rectangular plan with two chamfered corners. The chapel was included in the municipal register of historic monuments of the city of Sanok, published in 2015.
- Shrine of Saint John of Nepomuk located at Saint John Square next to the Zaleski Villa. It dates back to the late 18th century. It is believed to have been founded in 1810 by Franciszek Ksawery Krasicki as a votive offering for surviving an escape on horseback down a steep slope into the San river after the failed final defense of Sanok Castle against the Austrians in June 1809. It is approximately 5.5 metres tall, with a figure of Saint John of Nepomuk inside. The statue was restored in 2000 by conservator Barbara Bandurka, and the shrine itself was renovated by 2002 through the initiative of Jerzy Wielgosz.
- Shrine at Gajowa Street, located at the northern edge of the town beyond the San river in Biała Góra. According to various sources, it was built in 1922 or 1928, founded by Dr. Stanisław Domański, and erected near the sanatorium he owned. It underwent renovation lasting until 2012.
- Shrine on Kazimierz Lipiński Street in the Posada district under the invocation of Divine Providence, located next to the bus station. It dates back to the 19th century. Known as the "Shrine of Mrs. Ryniakowa" after the surname of its founder, who established it following the healing of her husband. Renovated between 2003 and 2007. Consecrated on 23 May 2007 by Bishop Adam Szal. Two commemorative plaques were placed on it. The shrine at 23 Kazimierz Lipiński Street was entered in the register of monuments in 1972 and in the municipal register of monuments of the city of Sanok, published in 2015.
- Shrine on Jagiellońska Street, located in a niche of the tenement house at number 35. It contains a cross from the turn of the 18th and 19th century and a statue of Our Lady of Sorrows. The shrine was renovated in 2006 through the initiative of the Franciscan fathers from Sanok.
- Shrine at the junction of Berek Joselewicz and Cerkiewna streets. It is open in form and features a statue of the Blessed Virgin Mary on a pedestal covered by a roof. It was built after World War II. In 2010, it was renovated and in August of that year consecrated by Father Andrzej Skiba from the Transfiguration of the Lord parish.
- Shrine at Władysław Sikorski Street. It is open in form and features a statue of the Blessed Virgin Mary of the Immaculate Conception on a pedestal covered by a roof. The plaque inscription reads: "The statue of the Blessed Virgin Mary of the Immaculate Conception was donated by Cecylia Greczner, longtime director of the St. Kinga School. Renovated by PGNiG Sanok Branch in 2008–2009". Until 2007, a building housing a nursery and the St. Kinga Primary School stood at this site.
- Shrine at Juliusz Słowacki Street (next to the Villa Dom Julii building) from the 19th century, built by the Bogda family, featuring an image of Our Lady of Perpetual Help. The site was entered into the municipal register of monuments of the city of Sanok, published in 2015.
- Shrines at Przemyska Street in the Olchowce district: one located near the Firefighters' House, dating from the first half of the 19th century, formerly containing an 18th-century icon of Saint Nicholas, now featuring an image of the Virgin Mary, Saint Joseph, and the Infant Jesus; the second from the 19th century, containing a statue of the Virgin Mary; and the third from around 1900, which previously held an icon of Christ of Nazareth.
- Shrine at Płowiecka Street in the Zatorze district, in the direction of the villages of Stróże Małe and Płowce.
- Shrine at 1 Stefan Okrzeja Street in the Posada district. It was entered into the municipal register of historic monuments of the city of Sanok, published in 2015.

== Natural monuments ==
In the area of Sanok, natural monuments have also been established: an ash at 16 Zamkowa Street (removed from its status on 19 December 2018), small-leaved linden trees on Rybacka Street, Ogrodowa Street, Adam Mickiewicz Street, and Płowiecka Street, and a horse chestnut on Adam Mickiewicz Street. By resolution of the Sanok City Council dated 10 September 2015, a sulphur water spring named "Nad wodospadem", located in the Olchowce district, was designated a natural monument.

== Bibliography ==
- Stefański, Stefan (1991). Sanok i okolice. Przewodnik turystyczny [Sanok and Surroundings. Tourist Guide] (in Polish). Sanok: Ziemia Sanocka.
- Oberc, Franciszek (1995). "Kalendarium sanockie 1974–1994" [Sanok Calendar 1974–1994]. In Feliks Kiryk (ed.). Sanok. Dzieje miasta [Sanok. History of the city] (in Polish). Kraków: Secesja. ISBN 83-86077-57-3.
- Oberc, Franciszek (1998). Pomniki i tablice pamiątkowe Sanoka [Monuments and Commemorative Plaques of Sanok] (in Polish). Sanok. ISBN 83-909787-1-7.
