= Tadeusz Kościuszko Street =

Street in downtown Sanok, Poland

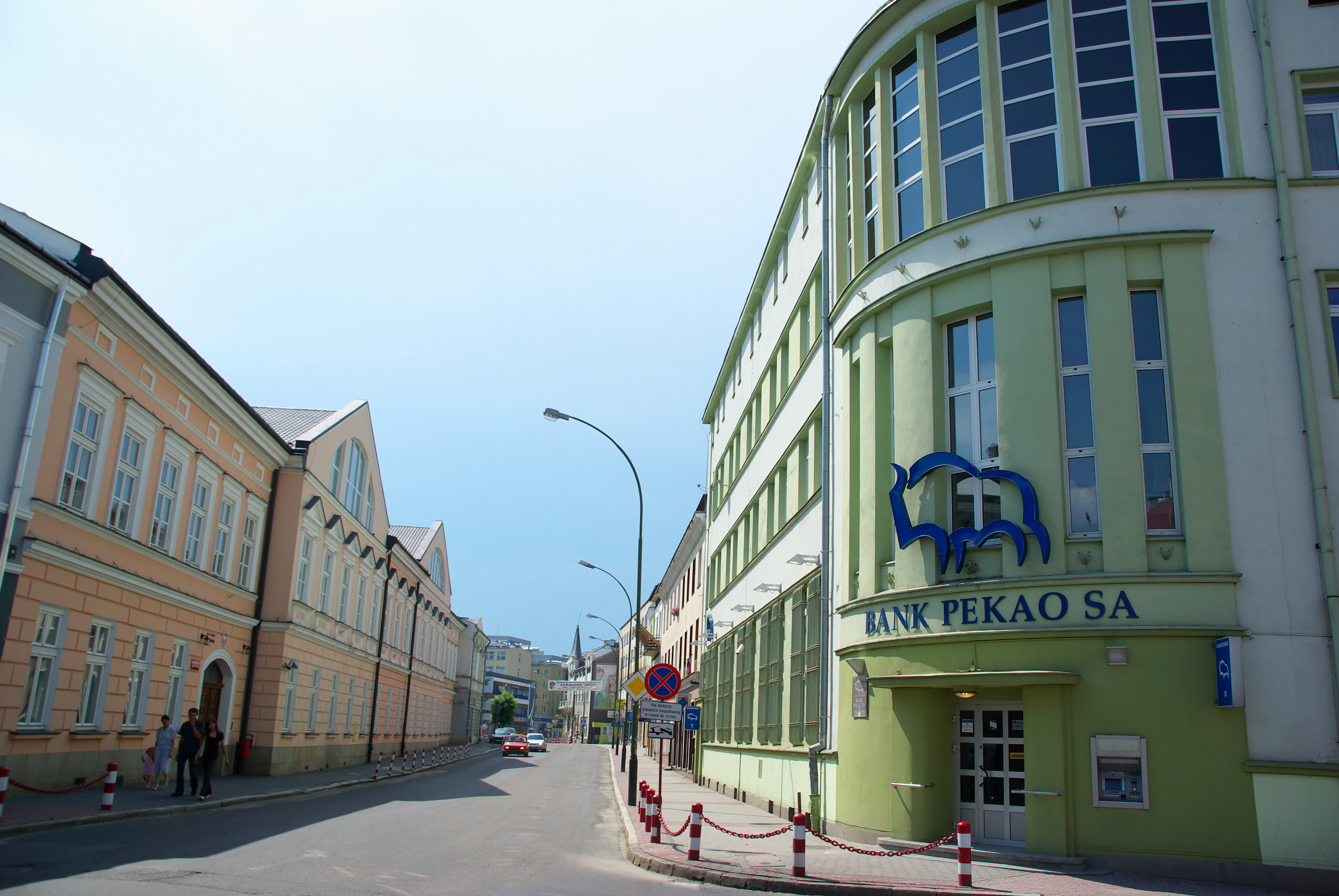
- View from the east. Bank building on the right, courthouse on the left (2011)
- Interactive map of Tadeusz Kościuszko Street
- Part of: Downtown
- Location: Sanok
- Coordinates: 49°33′37.1″N 22°12′1.2″E

Tadeusz Kościuszko Street is a street in the Downtown district of Sanok.

Named after Tadeusz Kościuszko, it runs from the intersection with Jagiellońska Street and 3 Maja Street in the city center westward to the junction with Rymanowska Street and Jan Matejko Street. Along its route, it intersects with Gregory of Sanok Street (north), Ignacy Daszyński Street (south), Partner Cities Square (southern edge), Adam Mickiewicz Street (north), Feliks Giela Street (south), Henryk Sienkiewicz Street (south), Władysław Sikorski Street (south), and Stara and Jasna streets (both south).

== History ==
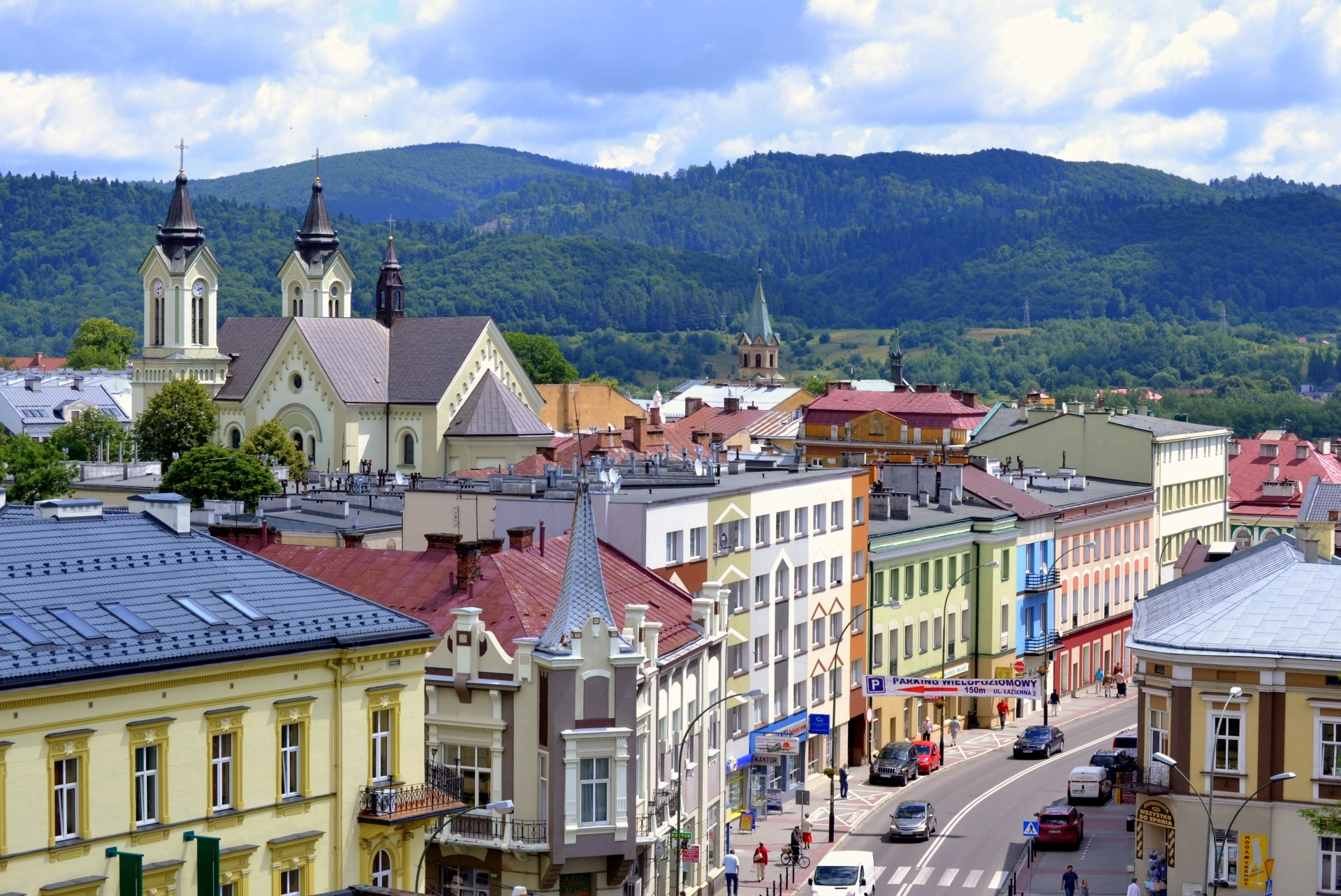
View of the street from the west in its middle section (2014)

The street was established during the Austro-Hungarian period following a collective decision by city authorities on 16 June 1867, under the tenure of Sanok's mayor, Erazm Łobaczewski. It was originally named Krakowska Street, extending from the Ramer house and the square near the Lis house to the road leading to the Central Cemetery. At that time, the street continued westward as Przedmiejska Street, now part of Tadeusz Kościuszko Street and Rymanowska Street. To commemorate the 100th anniversary of Tadeusz Kościuszko's oath on 24 March 1794 during the Kościuszko Uprising, the Sanok City Council renamed Krakowska Street to Tadeusz Kościuszko Street on 15 March 1894. The renaming was celebrated on 1 April 1894, with a plaque bearing the new name placed on the municipal house at number 86, formerly Krakowska Street.

In subsequent years, commercial establishments and shops, previously concentrated around St. Michael's Square and Market Square, emerged along the street. In 1894, the City Council banned the construction of single-story houses along Tadeusz Kościuszko Street, a decision opposed by the Jewish councilors' club. As Tadeusz Kościuszko and Jagiellońska streets developed, they became national roads, causing traffic congestion in the city center. During the Austrian rule under Galician autonomy at the turn of the 19th and 20th centuries, the street was predominantly inhabited by Jewish residents.

During World War II, under German occupation, the street was referred to as both Kościuszkostrasse and Hermann Göring Strasse in honor of Hermann Göring.

== Buildings ==
Buildings along Tadeusz Kościuszko Street from the eastern intersection with Jagiellońska and 3 Maja streets westward:

- Ramerówka tenement (its southern facade adjoins the start of Tadeusz Kościuszko Street; until 1939, listed as 2 Tadeusz Kościuszko Street).
- 2 Tadeusz Kościuszko Street, where the Sanok branch of the Polish Tatra Society operated before 1939.
- Tenement at 3 Tadeusz Kościuszko Street, previously number 1, once owned by Michał Słuszkiewicz, who ran a delicatessen there. It also housed offices of lawyers Henryk Atlas and Adolf Atlas. Until the early 1930s, it was numbered 60. In 1932, Władysław Gołkowski operated a Żywiec Brewery agency at number 3. During the Polish People's Republic, the Popularny bar was located there.
- Building at 4 Tadeusz Kościuszko Street. Listed in the municipal register of Sanok monuments in 2015.
- Sanok District Court Building (number 5). In the 1930s, it was numbered 84. It is listed in the voivodeship (1991) and municipal registers of Sanok monuments.
  - Before 1939, Sanok Prison operated at 5a Tadeusz Kościuszko Street. From 1939, it continued under German occupation at the same address, renamed Hermann Göring Straße.
- Former Building at 18 Tadeusz Kościuszko Street, which housed a pharmacy until 1963.
- Tenement at 15 Tadeusz Kościuszko Street, a corner building at the intersection with Ignacy Daszyński Street. In 1914, it housed the Concordia funeral home. Owned by Scheiner, it included Adam Słuszkiewicz's tavern and, after 1945, the Communal Cooperative "Peasant Self-Help". In the 1990s, it housed a Rural Department Store.
- Tenement at 16 Tadeusz Kościuszko Street. Listed in the municipal register of Sanok monuments in 2015.
- Building at 21 Tadeusz Kościuszko Street, completed in 1962 and opened in March 1964 as a Cooperative Department Store, an investment by Sanok's National Audit Union of Consumers' Społem Cooperatives. Later, it became the Sanok Department Store. Previously, the site housed buildings with Kukla's restaurant and Stepka's shop.
- In 1938, number 23 was assigned to a control point and medical circuit of the Social Insurance Institution in Krosno.
- Building at 25 Tadeusz Kościuszko Street, housing a PKO Bank Polski branch, opened in Sanok on 19 September 1954.
- Tadeusz Kościuszko Monument (with Adam Mickiewicz Park directly behind it). Previously, the Stupnicki Manor, colloquially called "cat manor", stood there before being relocated to the Museum of Folk Architecture.
- Tenement at 27 Tadeusz Kościuszko Street. From 1934 to 1939, when owned by A. Wilk, it housed the Private Coeducational Merchant Gymnasium of the Polish Teachers' Union.
- At number 28, before 1939, the Renaissance beauty salon operated.
- Building at 29 Tadeusz Kościuszko Street. In the 1930s, it was assigned to former Sanok mayor Jan Rajchel. During German occupation, it was assigned to Oleksandr Malynovskyi.
- Building at 34 Tadeusz Kościuszko Street. Ground-floor spaces are commercial and service units, while upper floors are residential. During the Polish People's Republic, the Parkowa restaurant and café operated on the ground floor, opened in 1969. Until 1999, the Max restaurant was there. From November 1999 to 1 March 2000, PPHU Orlik from Brzegi Górne leased the space, planning a youth pub, managed by the Sanok Municipal Economy Enterprise. In May 2000, the owner of Palermo pizzeria won the lease tender.
- Building at 36 Tadeusz Kościuszko Street, designed by Władysław Chomiak in 1926. Initially residential, it served as the Emilia Plater Private Polish Girls' Gymnasium from 1932 to 1939. During World War II, German forces occupied it. Post-war, it was a dormitory for students of Maria Skłodowska-Curie High School, the Pedagogical High School, and other Sanok schools until 1999. After renovation in 2000, it housed county administration departments from May 2001: Geodesy and Real Estate, Architecture and Construction, and Environmental Protection, Agriculture, and Forestry.
- Tenement at 37 Tadeusz Kościuszko Street, located at the corner with Władysław Sikorski Street (previously A. Małecki and W. Wróblewski streets). Built around 1930, it housed the Rolnik agricultural-commercial cooperative before 1939 and during German occupation.
- Former workshop of sculptor Stanisław Piątkiewicz.
- Building at 45 Tadeusz Kościuszko Street, home to the Sanok District Prosecutor's Office. Previously, the Płoszowski family manor stood in this area. During the Polish People's Republic, a gas station operated there.

=== Former numbering and buildings ===
- During the Polish People's Republic, the Wierchy County Sports, Tourism, and Recreation Center operated at number 24.
- Jankiel Fink resided at number 27. Before 1927, Stanisław Grodzicki's dairy from Bzianka operated there.
- House at number 65, assigned to Dr. Ignacy Grünspan in the early 1930s, later renumbered to 22.
- House at number 67, assigned to lawyer Dr. Włodzimierz Konstantynowicz in the early 1930s.
- House at number 74, assigned to lawyer Dr. Jerzy Pietrzkiewicz in the early 1930s.
- House at number 96, home to Aleksander Piech (1851–1932, father of Kazimierz Piech and Tadeusz Piech), a bronzesmith who ran the Church and Orthodox Church Paraments Workshop there.
- House at number 125, residence of Dr. Władysław Skalski.
- In the 1920s, a branch of the Polish Commercial Bank based in Poznań operated at number 183.
- The Wyrwicz family home, where M. Wyrwicz's confectionery operated before 1930.
- Before 1939, lawyer Dr. Stepan Wanczycki ran a law office at Tadeusz Kościuszko Street.
