= Tadeusz Kościuszko Monument, Sanok =

Monument to Tadeusz Kościuszko in Sanok, Poland

Tadeusz Kościuszko Monument
- Pomnik Tadeusza Kościuszki w Sanoku
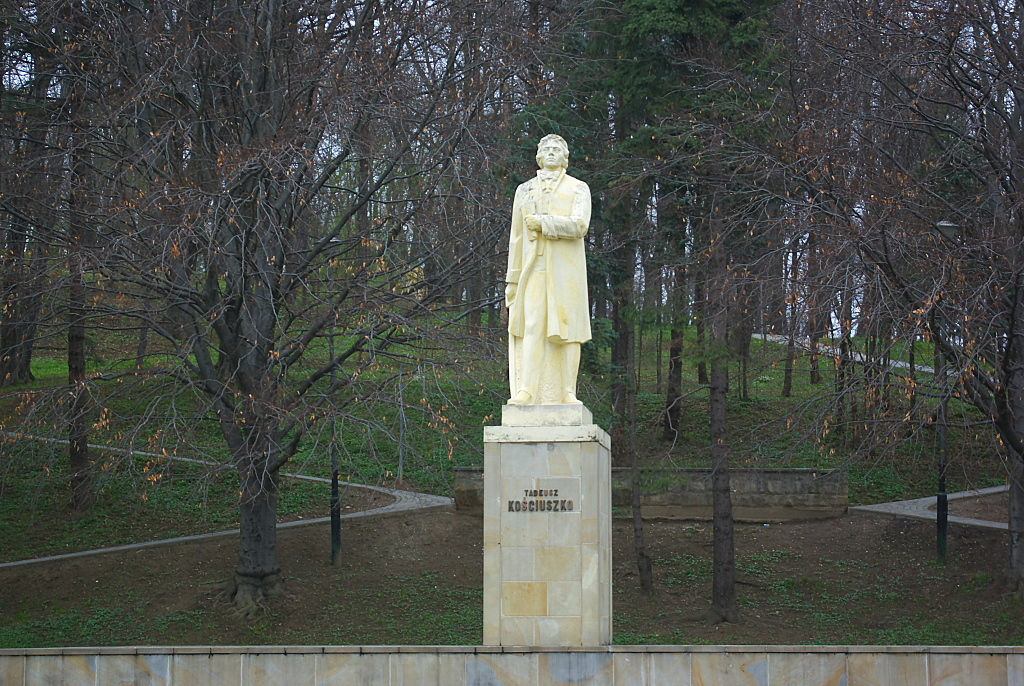
- Monument in 2012
- Interactive map of Tadeusz Kościuszko Monument
- Location: Sanok, Independence Square: Tadeusz Kościuszko Street/Adam Mickiewicz Park (Downtown)
- Coordinates: 49°33′37.6″N 22°12′2.0″E
- Designer: Józef Marek, Józef Wajda
- Type: Statue on a pedestal
- Height: 7.2 m (24 ft)
- Opening date: 15 September 1962
- Restored date: After 2000

The Tadeusz Kościuszko Monument is a monument commemorating Tadeusz Kościuszko in Sanok, Poland.

== History ==
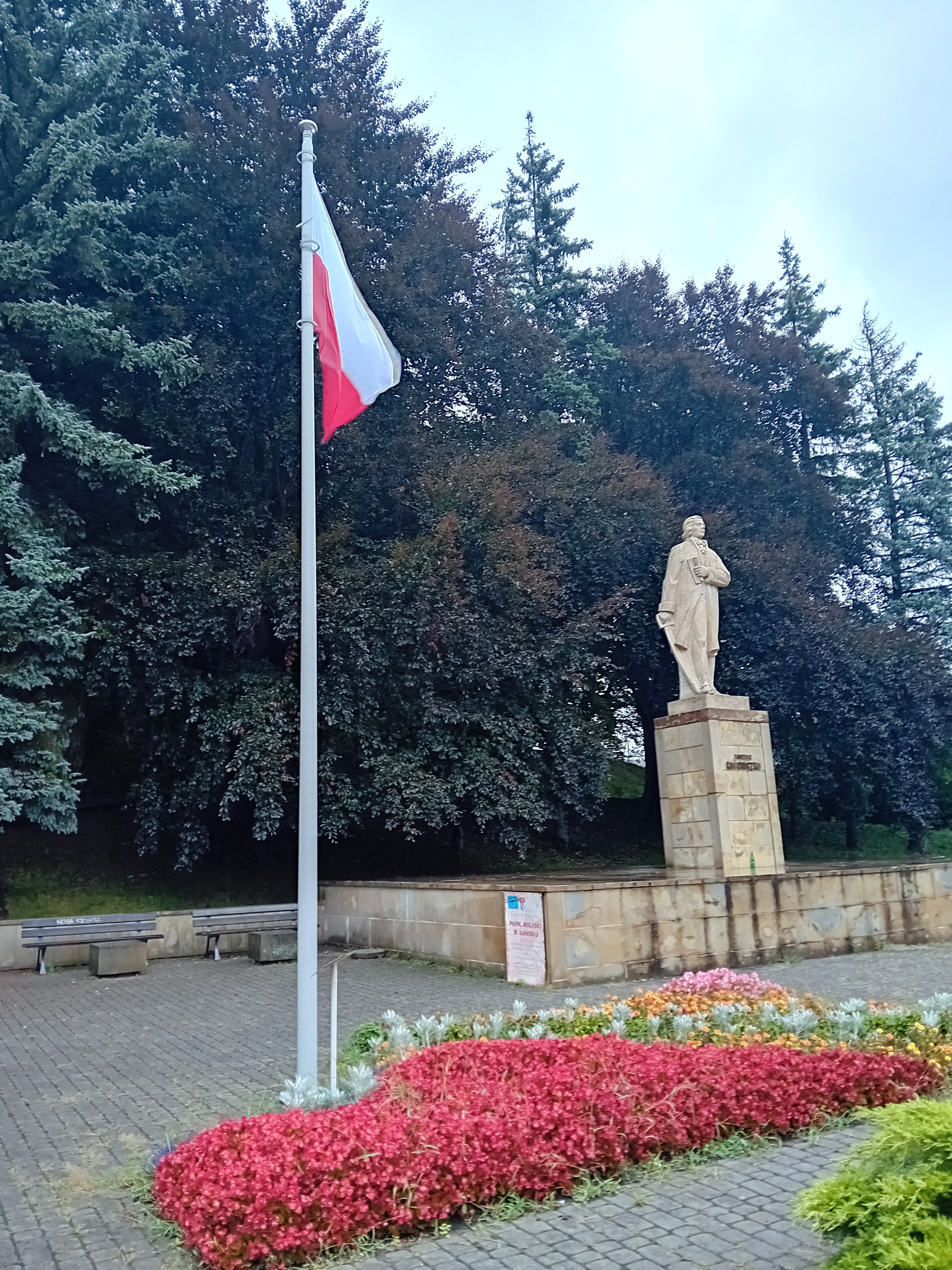
Monument in 2024

The first Tadeusz Kościuszko monument in Sanok existed from 1902 to 1941 and was located at St. John's Square. The second monument was erected as part of the celebrations marking the 800th anniversary of Sanok and the 1000th anniversary of Polish statehood. Although Sanok's first mention dates to 1150, the city's jubilee was delayed from 1950 and held in 1962, coinciding with the national milestone. In 1956, a Civic Committee for the Reconstruction of the Tadeusz Kościuszko Monument was formed, chaired by Tadeusz Walciszewski and including members such as Jan Bezucha, Stefan Stefański, and Mieczysław Przystasz. Initially, the committee planned to rebuild the monument at its original location in St. John Square, supported by individuals including Jadwiga Zaleska, Tomasz Tomasik, Emilia and Edmund Słuszkiewicz, and Jan Świerzowicz. However, this plan was not realized. On 25 April 1957, Jadwiga Zaleska appealed to the Sanok National Council to reconstruct the monument at St. John Square. In 1960, plans for the monument were announced in connection with the 550th anniversary of the Battle of Grunwald in 1410.

Ultimately, a new site was chosen in the city center at Tadeusz Kościuszko Street, near the southern slope of Parkowa Hill and the entrance to Adam Mickiewicz Park. Previously, a manor house owned by Helena Stupnicka, colloquially called the "cat manor", stood nearby before being relocated to the Museum of Folk Architecture.

The original designer was Karol Hukan, who died before completion, with Józef Marek and Józef Wajda finalizing the design in 1958. By mid-1962, the monument's foundations were laid. A limestone block was prepared, and sculptor Józef Potępa, an adjunct at the Jan Matejko Academy of Fine Arts in Kraków, began crafting the statue. Financial support came from the Provincial Committee of the Social Fund for the Reconstruction of Warsaw and the KN Exploitation Plant. The monument was crafted from sandstone sourced from a quarry in Pińczów, with the pedestal's surroundings made from sandstone from Strzegom.

The statue depicts Tadeusz Kościuszko holding the Proclamation of Połaniec in one hand and a saber in the other. The main inscription on the front of the pedestal reads "Tadeusz Kościuszko". An additional inscription on the eastern side of the sandstone pedestal states: "Built in 1962 through the efforts of a civic committee with contributions from the Social Fund for the Reconstruction of the Country and Capital". The monument stands over 7.2 meters tall, with the statue at 3.2 meters and the pedestal over 4 meters. The surrounding area was designed by Antoni Kędzierski and Henryk Machnik.

The monument was placed at its designated site in late August 1962. Its ceremonial unveiling took place on 15 September 1962, during the first day of Sanok's 800th anniversary celebrations, officiated by Leszek Rychter, chairman of the Presidium of the Sanok National Council, and Stefan Stefański, a councilor and director of the Sanok Historical Museum.

Renovations were carried out in 1979, 1999, and 2008.

The monument's surroundings have become a venue for patriotic celebrations, including 3 May Constitution Day and National Independence Day. On 10 April 2018, the Sanok City Council named the plaza around the monument Independence Square.
