= Jagiellońska Street, Sanok =

Street in the Downtown district of Sanok, Poland

Jagiellońska Street
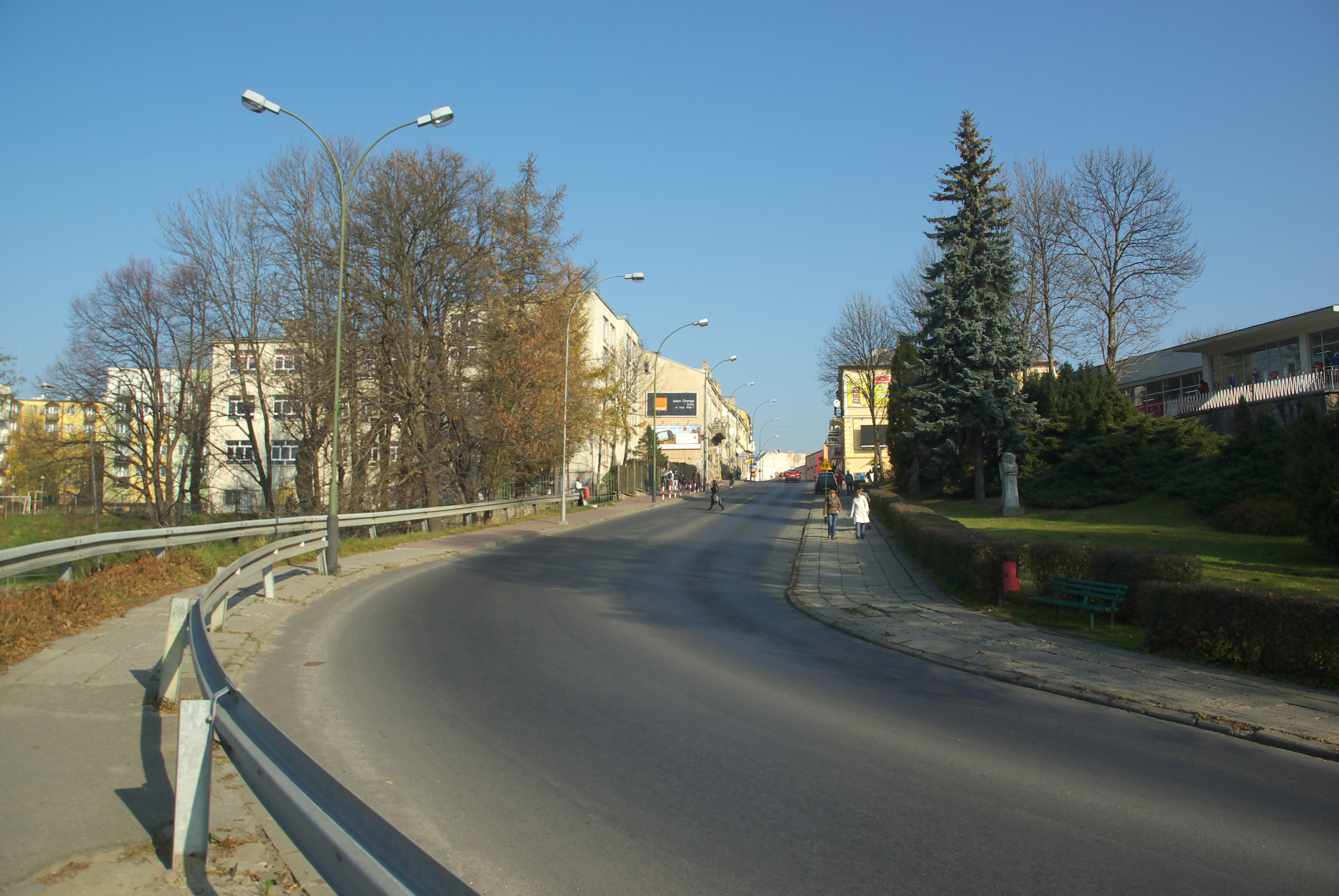
- Approach to Jagiellońska Street near Okopisko
- Interactive map of Jagiellońska Street
- Native name: Ulica Jagiellońska (Polish)
- Former name(s): Lwowska Street, Karol Świerczewski Street, Jagiellońskastrasse, Adolf Hitler Strasse
- Part of: Downtown
- Location: Sanok
- Coordinates: 49°33′27″N 22°12′9.5″E

Jagiellońska Street is a street in the Downtown district of Sanok, Poland. It starts at the intersection of Tadeusz Kościuszko Street and 3 Maja Street in the city center, running south initially, then east, until it reaches a level crossing where it transitions into Kazimierz Lipiński Street.

== History ==
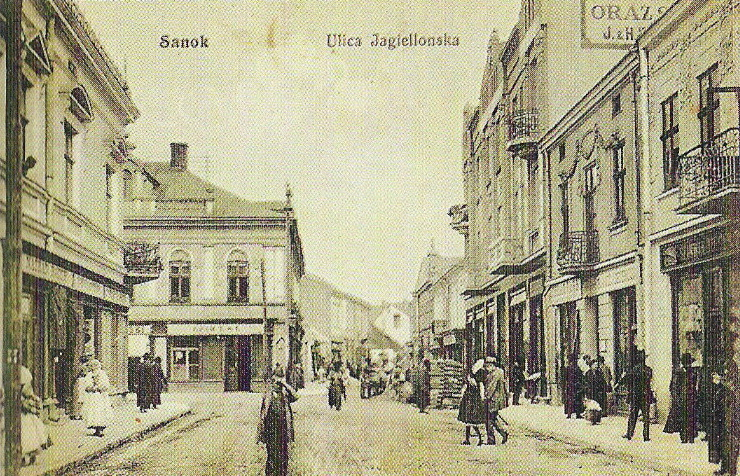
Northern part of the street in 1914

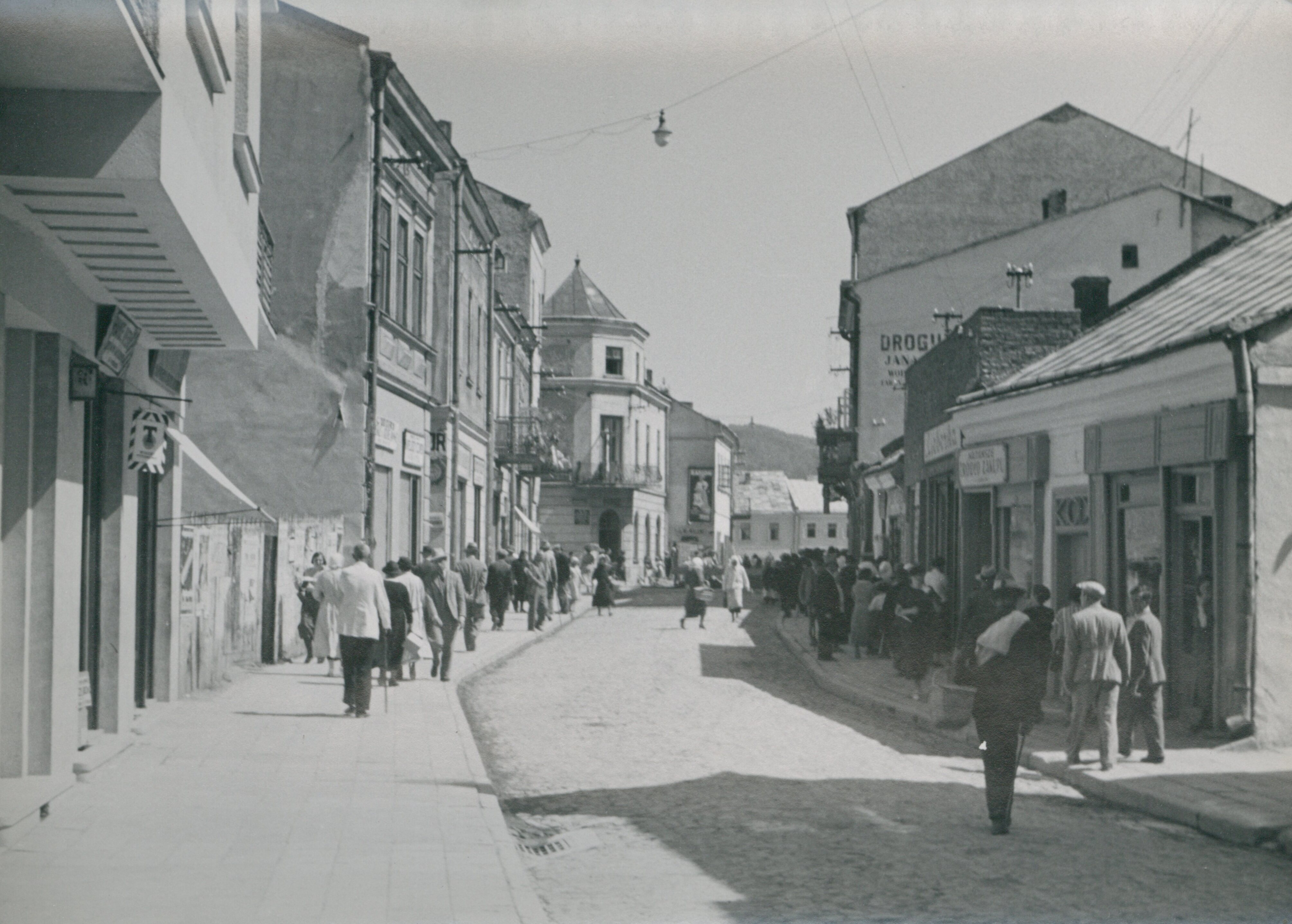
View of the street before 1936

The street was established during the Austro-Hungarian period by a collective decision of the city authorities on 16 June 1867, under the administration of Mayor Erazm Łobaczewski. It was originally named Lwowska Street, extending from the post office to the Ramer house.

On 4 September 1902, following a request from the Committee for the Commemoration of the Defeat of the Teutonic Knights at Grunwald, the City Council renamed Lwowska Street to Jagiellońska Street.

During the Galician autonomy in the late 19th and early 20th centuries, the street was predominantly inhabited by Jewish residents. Before 1906, the Sanok Beautification Society planted 80 linden trees along the street. Over time, commercial establishments and shops, previously concentrated around St. Michael's Square and the Market Square, began to appear along Jagiellońska Street. As Tadeusza Kościuszki and Jagiellońska Streets became national roads, they faced challenges due to increased traffic in the city center. A particular difficulty was the steep incline near the Old Jewish Cemetery, known as Okopisko. In 1937, the street was widened.

During World War II under German occupation, the street was renamed Jagiellońskastrasse and later Adolf Hitler Strasse in honor of Adolf Hitler. In July 1947, the Sanok Municipal National Council renamed the street after Karol Świerczewski, who spent his last night in Sanok. This name persisted throughout the Polish People's Republic era. In December 1989, the Municipal National Council resolved to revert the name to Jagiellońska Street.

== Street Architecture ==
The municipal register of Sanok's monuments, published in 2015, includes buildings at numbers 1, 2, 4, 5, 9, 10, 14, 16, 20, 21, 23, 25, 33, 35, 49, 52, and 70.

Buildings along Jagiellońska Street, from the northwest at the intersection with Tadeusz Kościuszko and 3 Maja streets, proceeding south and then east:

- No. 1: Tenement house, listed in the 2015 municipal register of monuments.
- No. 2: Tenement house, with its eastern facade along Jagiellońska Street and northern facade at the start of Tadeusz Kościuszko Street, listed in the 2015 municipal register.
- No. 3: In 1938, assigned to physician Dr. Nathan Wallach.
- No. 4: Tenement house, formerly owned by the Nowak and Biedka families, including Paweł Biedka. It briefly housed a post office before 1914. After Poland regained independence, it housed the Domestic Industry Store established by the Women's League under Stanisława Tarnawiecka. Until the early 1930s, it was numbered 55. In 1934, Zdzisław Robel operated a Sports Equipment and Haberdashery store. In 1938, it was assigned to Stanisław Biedka and then-Mayor Maksymilian Słuszkiewicz. Post-World War II, it housed the local branch of the Polish Association of Former Political Prisoners of Nazi Prisons and Concentration Camps. The tenement's doors feature floral motif decorations. Listed in the 2015 municipal register.
- No. 5: Tenement house, listed in the 2015 municipal register.
- 1 Zaułek Dobrego Wojaka Szwejka Street: Tenement house with its eastern front along Jagiellońska Street, formerly home to the Corso café and Szafran's café.
- No. 8: Before 1939, housed Irma Heftler's Viennese Fashion Salon.
- No. 9: Tenement house, listed in the 2015 municipal register.
- No. 10: Tenement house, originally owned by Jan Słuszkiewicz (with his initials "JS" in relief on the facade), later by Jan Terlecki. Built in the Art Nouveau style. From 1906 to 1946, it housed the Peszkowski confectionery, run by Zygmunt and Maria Peszkowski, parents of Father Zdzisław Peszkowski. In 1938, assigned to lawyer Dr. Izaak Nehmer. On 11 November 2013, Sanok scouts placed a commemorative plaque for Father Zdzisław Peszkowski. Post-war, it housed the Społem Cooperative named "Ewa", including a café. Currently, it hosts the Ewa store. Listed in the 2015 municipal register.
- No. 11: Building, formerly the restaurant and hotel of Janusz Steciak, known as Steciakówka, under number 83 until the early 1930s. In 1938, Józef Steciak ran a grocery-delicatessen trade with a restaurant and breakfast room. In early 1928, newly elected Mayor Jan Porajewski met with residents at Steciak's restaurant.
- Opposite No. 11: A hotel operated by the Józef Mozołowski's family.
- No. 12: In the late 1930s, assigned to the Sanok branch of the Polish Tourist and Sightseeing Society and the Agricultural Circles Warehouse.
- No. 13: Tenement house. On 1 May 1987, after five years of construction, the three-star Turysta Hotel opened, the first of its kind in the Podkarpackie region, owned by the Rzeszów branch of the Turysta Cooperative Tourism Agency. Later, it housed Pod Trzema Różami Hotel and a Santander Consumer Bank branch. A commemorative plaque on the Good Soldier Švejk Trail marks the stay of Józef Švejk, as described in Jaroslav Hašek's The Good Soldier Švejk. In the late 20th/early 21st century, the Palermo pizzeria operated here.
- Former building near No. 13: A non-existent building, once housing the Sanok Hotel and a restaurant run by Kieszkowski, later by Józef Steciak and his wife Julia. Later, it housed the Kubuś bar under the address 13 Karol Świerczewski Street. The building was demolished in 1984. Nearby, before 1939, Leon Gottdank ran a photography studio.
- No. 14: Tenement house. Until 1955, it served as a dormitory for Sanok economic schools alongside No. 16. In 1938, Andrzej Szmyd's restaurant operated here. During the Polish People's Republic era, it housed the communal Bieszczady Hotel. Listed in the 2015 municipal register.
- Nos. 40, 15, 21: A printing house and bookstore operated by Karol Pollak (founder) and Franciszek Patała. In 1938, No. 15 was assigned to the County Inspectorate of the Mutual Insurance Company. After 1945, No. 21 was acquired by craftsman and master tinsmith Jakub Kolano, who ran a workshop there.
- No. 16: Tenement house, listed in the 2015 municipal register.
- No. 17: Before 1914, housed Karol Baranowicz's artistic-locksmith workshop.
- No. 20: Tenement house. During German occupation, it housed the Deutsches Haus Hotel. In 1942, it was at 32 Adolf Hitler Strasse, managed by Paul Kulig. Post-war, it housed the emergency medical services. In the early 21st century, it was the Sanok City Guard's headquarters. Listed in the 2015 municipal register.
- No. 21: Tenement house, listed in the 2015 municipal register.
- No. 23: Tenement house, listed in the 2015 municipal register.
- No. 25: Tenement house, formerly home to the Adria restaurant. Listed in the 2015 municipal register.
- Former house behind No. 22: A historic house, demolished in the 1970s.
- No. 24a: Non-existent Malawski family house, including Tadeusz Malawski, located on the western side of the street's curve.
- No. 30: From 1982 to 2012, the Okęcie Bus Station. Since 2014, Galeria Sanok.
- Okopisko: The site of the former Old Jewish Cemetery, now a green space with five sculptures. Above Okopisko, a building housed the Karpacka restaurant, built in the 1970s.
- No. 33: Tenement house, assigned to Rudolf Frey in 1938. Listed in the 2015 municipal register.
- No. 35: Tenement house with a niche containing a chapel with a cross from the turn of the 18th/19th century and a restored statue of Our Lady of Sorrows, renovated in 2006 by Sanok Franciscan monks. Listed in the 2015 municipal register.
- No. 43: House, assigned to dentist and captain Dr. Leopold Dręgiewicz until 1939.
- No. 48: Former Murowanka Inn, temporarily housing Mateusz Beksiński and Walenty Lipiński between 1845 and 1846, who purchased nearby land at the intersection of Lwowska Street (now Jagiellońska Street) and Stanisław Konarski Street to establish a boilermaking workshop.
- Former Beksiński and Lipiński House: Located over the Płowiecki Stream at the former 225 Lwowska Street, later numbered 41, 43, or 44. Inhabited by descendants of Mateusz Beksiński, including Władysław Beksiński and Zdzisław Beksiński. In 1972, the wooden house and former boilermaking workshop at No. 43 were added to the updated Sanok monument register. The manor existed until the 1970s. In 2005, a columnar oak was planted in its place, now Beksiński Green, to honor Zdzisław Beksiński.
- No. 49: Former residential tenement, now the Jagielloński Hotel, operational since May 1995. Listed in the 2015 municipal register.
- No. 52: Tenement house with a relief of the original conscription number 218 above the entrance. Listed in the 2015 municipal register.
- No. 53: Before 1914, housed Abraham Pinkas' licensed shoe upper factory.
- No. 70: Tenement house, home to the Ignacy Łukasiewicz Pharmacy, the first private pharmacy in Sanok after 50 years, opened on 21 September 1991 by Danuta and Romuald Skalscy. Listed in the 2015 municipal register.

=== Other historical sites ===
- Before 1939, the street housed the School Inspectorate.
- In 1932, Fani Herzig ran a restaurant.
- In the 1930s, Dawid Taubenfeld operated an electric kosher deli factory.
- During German occupation, Karol Baranowicz's mills operated at No. 48.
- In 1946, the Sanoczanka Sanok football club had its headquarters at No. 26, first floor.
