= Adam Mickiewicz Park =

Urban park in Sanok, Poland

- Park miejski im. Adama Mickiewicza
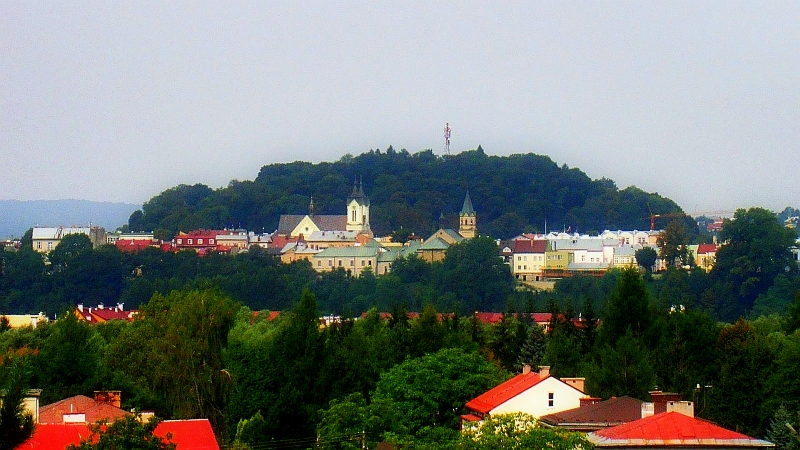
- Sanok city center – city park in the background
- Interactive map of Adam Mickiewicz Park
- Location: Sanok
- Coordinates: 49°33′47.002″N 22°11′52.001″E
- Area: 10 ha (25 acres)
- Established: 1896
- Designer: Władysław Beksiński

Adam Mickiewicz Park is an urban park in Sanok, Poland.

It is the largest mountain-type park in Poland, located in the heart of the city, dominated by the Parkowa Hill, which rises to 364 metres above sea level. Spanning over 10 hectares, the park is accessible via two entrances: one through the park gate from Adam Mickiewicz Street, adjacent to Zdzisław Peszkowski Scouts Square, and another from Kościuszko Street near the Tadeusz Kościuszko Monument at Independence Square. The park is bordered by notable landmarks, including the former Torsan ice rink, the Sanok Sokół movement building, and the Maria Skłodowska-Curie High School.

== History ==
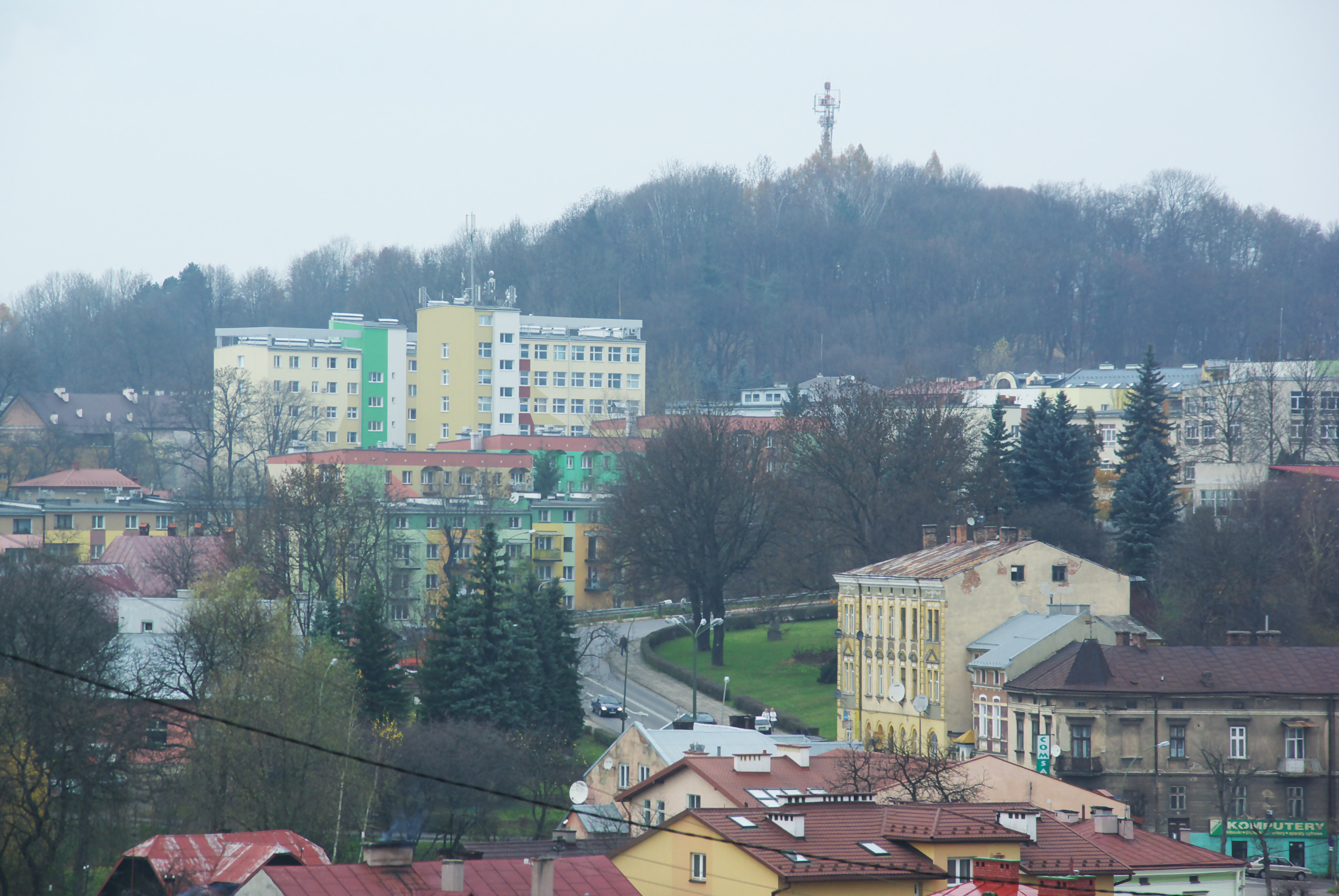
View of the park above the city centre from the east

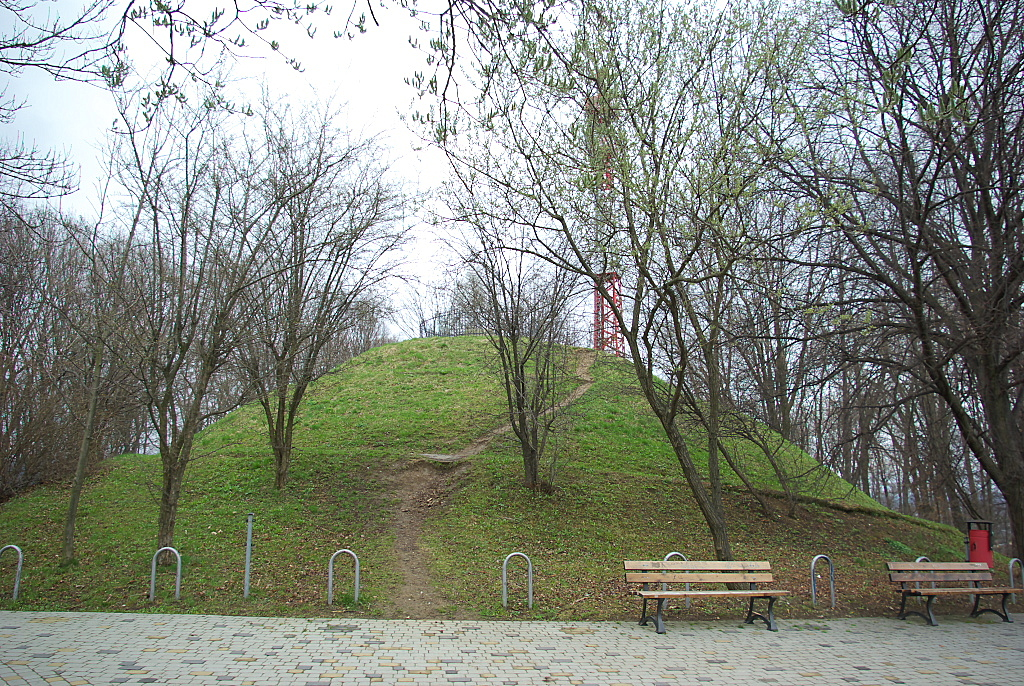
Adam Mickiewicz Mound

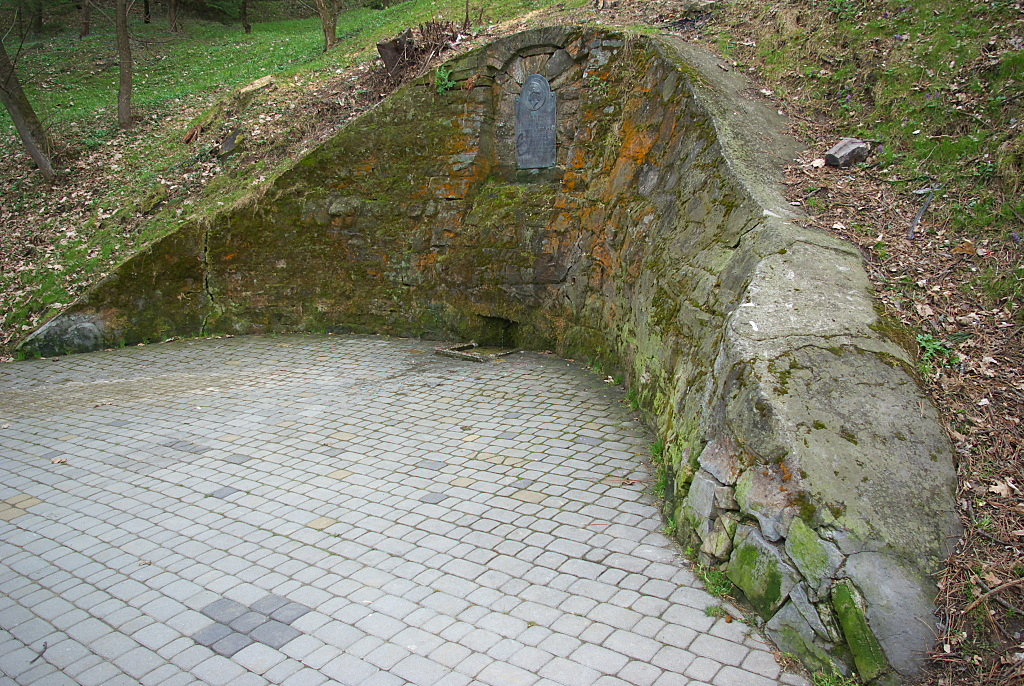
Chopin Spring with a plaque commemorating its founder, Dr. Mniszek-Tchórznicki

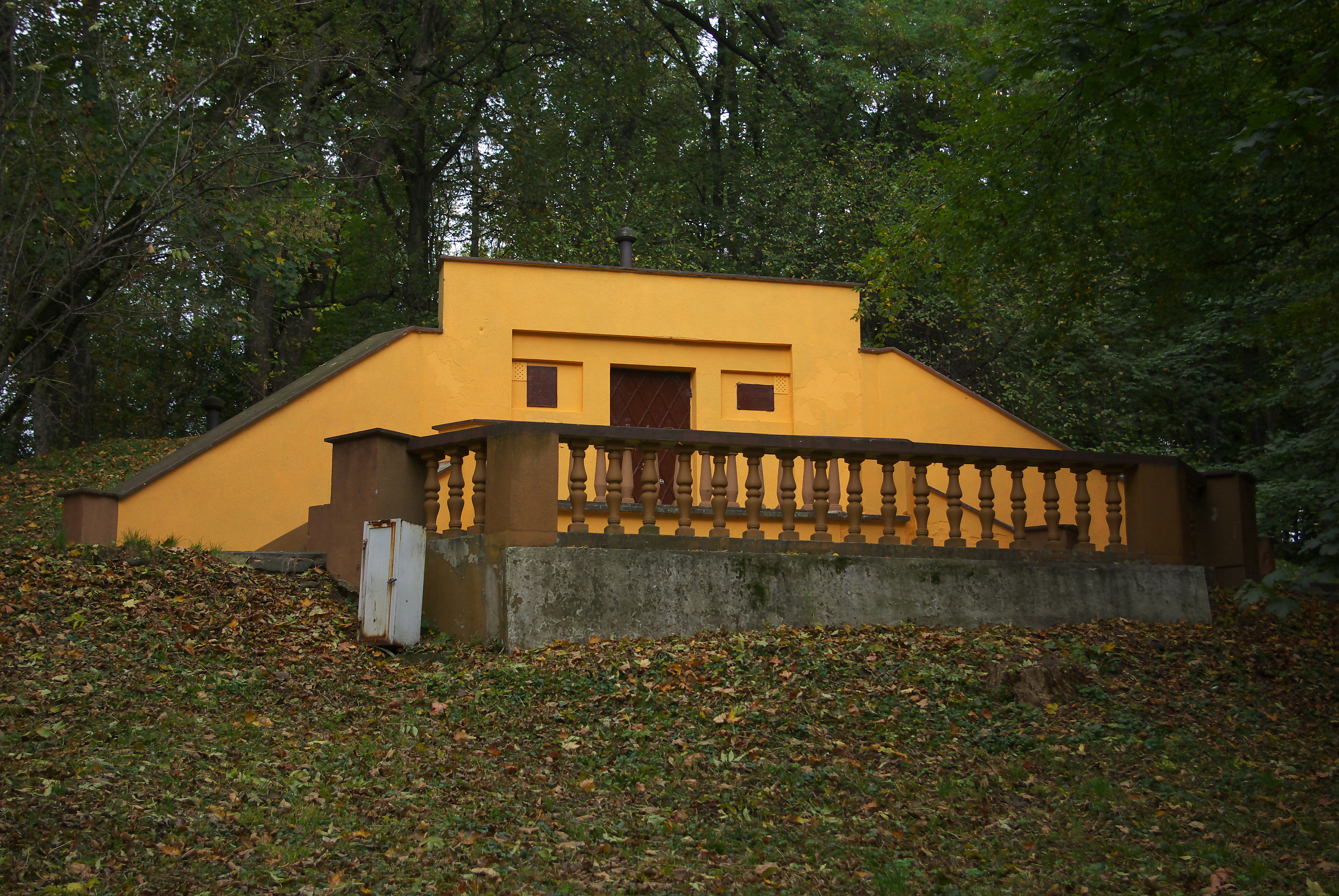
Municipal waterworks reservoir building

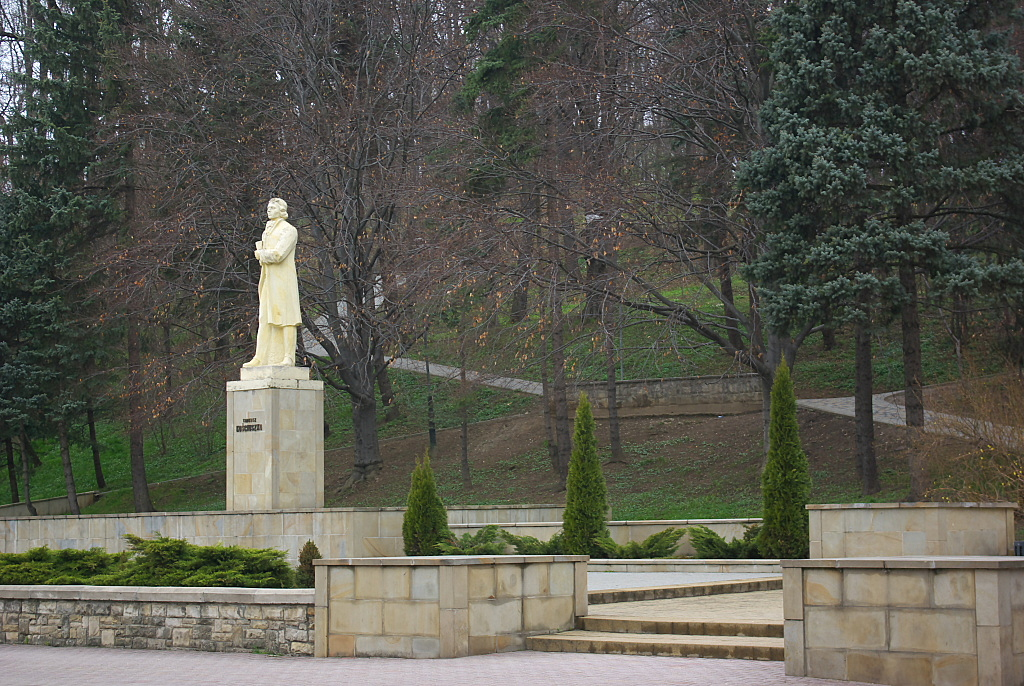
Tadeusz Kościuszko Monument at the park's edge at Tadeusz Kościuszko Street

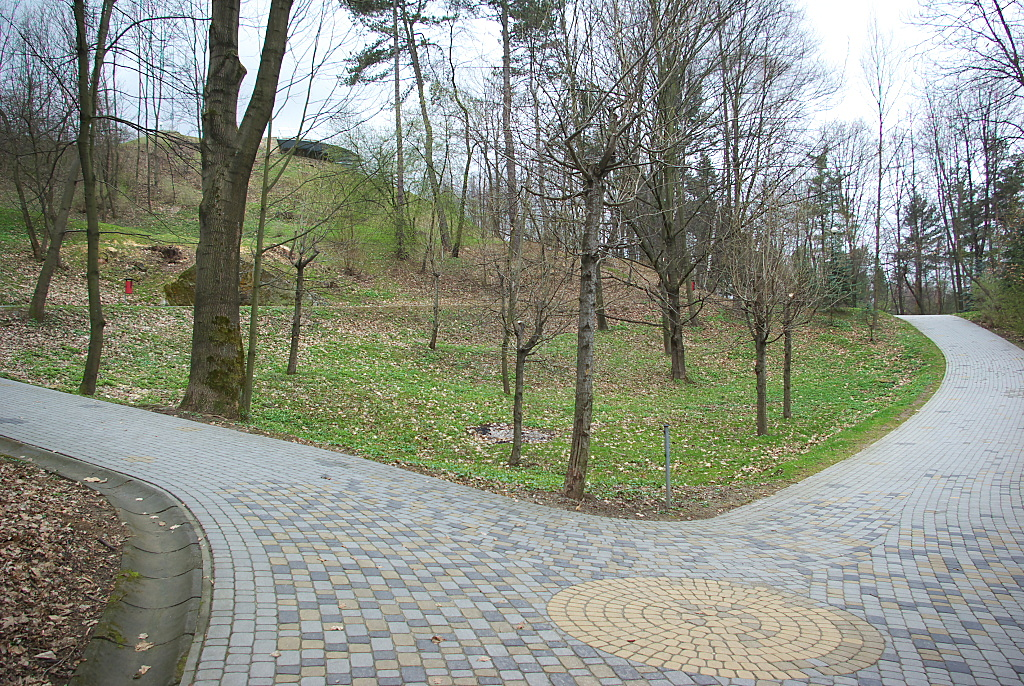
Park pathways

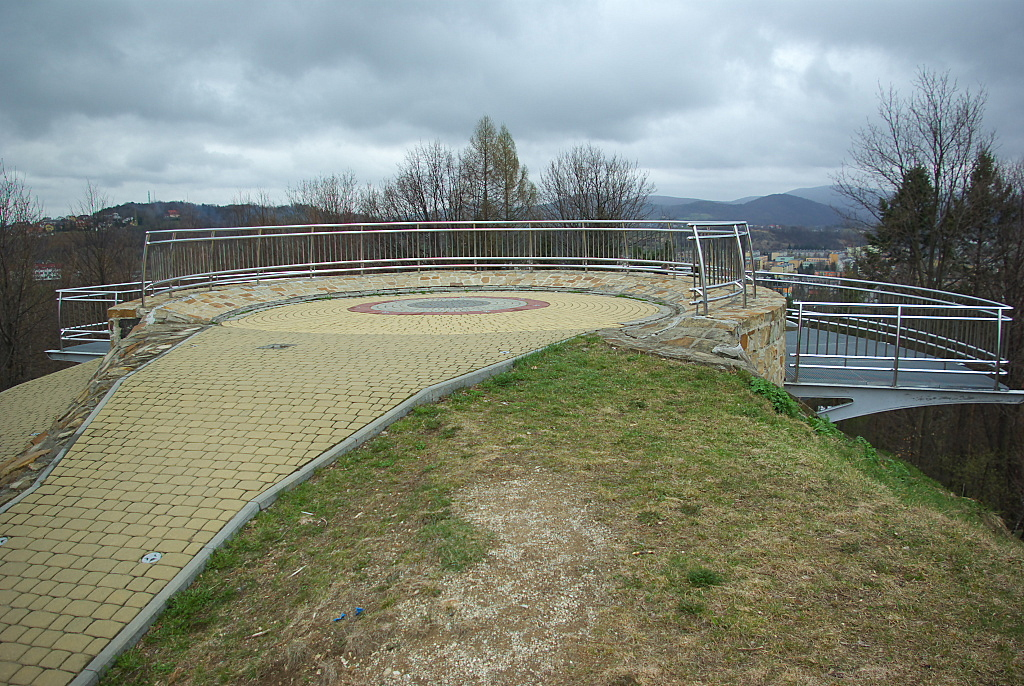
Observation platform

On 10 May 1885, a city garden was established in Sanok, designed by E. Herzig and planned by county engineer Jan Hantschl. The park's origins on Stróżnia Hill (also known as Aptekarka, now Parkowa Hill) date back to around 1890. The park was designed by city architect Władysław Beksiński. In 1896, architect Arnold Röhring, visiting Sanok on 6 June, proposed a triangular layout for the school building, the Sokół movement building, and a restaurant at the park's entrance, now Zdzisław Peszkowski Scouts Square.

The park's establishment was spearheaded by August Ścibor-Rylski, who personally planted the first trees. On 25 August 1900, he guided Leon Piniński, the Galician Governor, through the park. In 1898, the Sanok City Council named the park and the adjacent eastern street after Adam Mickiewicz to mark the centenary of his birth. That same year, a small Adam Mickiewicz Mound was created by local high school students on the hill's summit, later expanded significantly. In 1905, a committee purchased adjacent land from Ms. Tebinkowa to enlarge the mound. Work continued from 27 September 1905, with voluntary participation from residents and students, until 1910. A commemorative stone was placed to honour Mickiewicz's centenary. The park was developed on the hill's slopes.

In 1899, the park was landscaped with embankments, pathways, and planted trees and shrubs. The Sanok City Beautification Society led efforts to transform Aptekarka Hill into a park, with active participation from school youth. Engineer Jan Maciej Kosina contributed to the afforestation, supported by then-Mayor Aital Witoszyński. Before 1906, the society installed a gazebo. It remained in use in later years.

The park's creation was initiated by the Znicz Educational Society, which was involved in promoting education, culture, and reading, led by pharmacist Jan Zarewicz, who donated the southern and western slopes of Stróżnia Hill to the city for a nominal fee, hence the name "Aptekarka". Similarly, Dr. Aleksander Mniszek-Tchorznicki, who, as a judge and head of a delegation, contributed to keeping Morskie Oko within Poland's borders during a territorial dispute, donated over six morgs of land on the northern slope in 1910 to expand the park. The signing of the contract was announced on 12 May 1910. The annexed northern section was named after Fryderyk Chopin in 1910 to commemorate his centenary. As a result, the northern section of the park became known as "Chopin Park". A sandstone-encased spring, the Chopin Spring, was adorned with a bronze plaque featuring Chopin's likeness, crafted by sculptor Maria Gerson-Dąbrowska and produced at the Sanok Wagon Factory.

In 1909, further improvements were made to the park: a roundabout was created (now nonexistent, currently the site of Zdzisław Peszkowski Scouts Square), new walking paths were laid in Chopin Park, and new trees and plants continued to be planted. In 1910, hundreds of metres of pathways were added. In 1910, several hundred meters of paths were created on the park's slopes. Between March and April 1910, the Imperial and Royal National School Council issued letters of thanks for supporting the cause of physical education for school youth, addressed to A. Mniszek-Tchorznicki (for donating land for Chopin Park as a place for youth games and activities) and to the Sanok starosta Antoni Pogłodowski (for his initiative and mediation in the matter). In the spring of 1910, several dozen ornamental shrubs were planted in the Fryderyk Chopin section, donated by Stanisława Tarnawiecka. On 11 June 1911, Chopin Park was ceremonially opened with a festival celebrating the spring's completion. By then, the park spanned 6 hectares, maintained by a full-time city gardener. From 1913 to 1940, Piotr Radwański served in this role. Initially, the park was called the "City Garden" or "Public Garden". At its inception, it covered about 5 hectares.

The park served as a recreational space, often hosting musical performances. In the early 20th century, youth celebrated Constitution Day on 3 May by lighting large juniper bonfires on Parkowa Hill.

On 5 September 1931, Samuel Rein, a local Jewish communist and electrician, was shot in the park. Before 1939, the park was sometimes referred to as "Jewish" due to the presence of Zionist groups.

During World War II, under German occupation, the Germans built a swimming pool (Nur für Deutsche) with a beach on Parkowa Hill's slope, planning a cable car to Biała Góra across the San river. Artillery positions were also set up. At the war's end, in autumn 1944, Red Army observation posts were established on the southern slope.

After the war, in 1946, engineer Stanisław Beksiński oversaw park redevelopment planning. During the Polish People's Republic, a fountain with flower beds existed at the park's entrance, later removed. Pathways were paved, and a ski jumping hill was built. By early 1965, the ski jumping hill was nearly complete, designed for jumps up to 45 metres. On 7 February 1965, a ski lift from the Sanok stadium was opened, and the slalom slope was illuminated. It operated into the 1970s. Sledging competitions, organised by Jerzy Lisowski, were held.

In the 1970s, the park was redeveloped based on designs from the Jan Matejko Academy of Fine Arts until 1979. Minor repairs occurred until 1990. From 2005, revitalisation efforts included tree maintenance and improved accessibility. In 2006, the tree stock was inspected, and new plantings were added. In 2007, renovations included a restored entrance from Mickiewicz Street, new fencing, paved pathways, lighting, benches, and an observation platform at the summit, opened in September 2007.

In February 2012, a usage regulation for the park was enacted. In 2015, the park was listed in Sanok's municipal register of monuments.

== Features ==
- A non-existent Memorial Monument, erected during German occupation to mark the attack on the Soviet Union, inscribed: "Zur Erinnerung an den 22. Juni 1941 Festungs-Pionierstab 24 Vorm. Oberbaustab 33. 1940-1942". A dome taken from a Soviet bunker in Krzywula near Lesko was placed on the monument's structure. The inscription's metal letters were gradually removed post-war, and the monument was demolished in 1957.
- Tadeusz Kościuszko Monument, unveiled in September 1962, located at the southern entrance from Kościuszko Street, named Independence Square in 2018.
- Monument of Gratitude to the Soldiers of the Red Army, existed from 1977 to 2016 at the eastern entrance from Mickiewicz Street. Earlier, from 1945, another monument stood there, replaced by an obelisk in 1951. In 1977, soldiers' remains were exhumed and relocated to the Central Cemetery.
- Historic waterworks building from the 1930s, including a pumping station from the early 20th century (eastern slope). It includes a retention reservoir for the municipal water system, which was designed by engineer Otto Nadolski in 1934. During the tenure of Mayor Jan Rajchel (1881–1937), construction began in February 1934 and was completed with the commissioning of the municipal waterworks on 24/25 June 1936. The water intake was installed in Trepcza, and the reservoir tank was built in the city park. By the late 1930s, the front façade of the building bore the inscription "Sanok Water Reservoir". In September 2012, the building's exterior was repainted. Two commemorative plaques are mounted on the façade of the building, which was repainted in 2012:
  - A plaque commemorating the 1936 waterworks opening, inscribed: "The water supply system was built with financial assistance from labor funds between February 1934 and July 1936. It was officially opened on 2 August 1936 during the presidency of the Republic of Poland by Prof. Ignacy Mościcki, with provincial authority held by Colonel Władysław Belina-Prażmowski in the Lwów Voivodeship, Major Wojciech Bucior in Sanok County, and Mayor Dr. Jan Rajchel in the Royal Free City of Sanok. The project was designed by Prof. Otto Nadolski and carried out by the Municipal Administration and the engineering firm of Jerzy Dobrowolski. The construction works were overseen by engineer Roman Wajda".
  - A plaque marking the 50th anniversary of the waterworks, erected by Sanok Municipal Economy Enterprise in May 1984, unveiled on 8 June 1984, inscribed: “The Sanok Municipal Utilities Company funded this plaque to commemorate the 50th anniversary of the municipal water supply system. Sanok, 1984".
- Parkowa Hill TV Tower, operational since September 1971.
- Four memorial trees dedicated to Scouting figures, planted on 2 October 2010:
  - A plane tree for Andrzej Małkowski (1888–1919), inscribed: "Plane tree 'Andrzej' in tribute to Andrzej Małkowski, founder of Polish Scouting. Sanok District ZHP named after Fr. Scoutmaster Zdzisław Peszkowski. 100 years of Polish Scouting. Sanok, 2 October 2010".
  - A plane tree for Olga Drahonowska-Małkowska (1888–1979), inscribed: "Plane tree 'Oleńka' in tribute to Scoutmaster Olga Małkowska, founder of Polish Girl Scouting. Sanok District ZHP named after Fr. Scoutmaster Zdzisław Peszkowski. 100 years of Polish Scouting. Sanok, 2 October 2010".
  - A plane tree for Albina Wójcik (1901–1982), inscribed: "Plane tree 'Albina' in tribute to Scoutmaster Albina Wójcik, longtime commander of the Sanok Girl Scout district. Sanok District ZHP named after Fr. Scoutmaster Zdzisław Peszkowski. 100 years of Polish Scouting. Sanok, 2 October 2010".
  - A plane tree for Czesław Borczyk (1910–2004), inscribed: "Plane tree 'Czesław' in tribute to Scoutmaster Czesław Borczyk, longtime commander of the Sanok Scout district. Sanok District ZHP named after Fr. Scoutmaster Zdzisław Peszkowski. 100 years of Polish Scouting. Sanok, 2 October 2010".
