= Monument of Gratitude to the Soldiers of the Red Army =

Former monument in Sanok, Poland

Monument of Gratitude to the Red Army Soldiers
- Pomnik Wdzięczności Żołnierzom Armii Czerwonej (Polish)
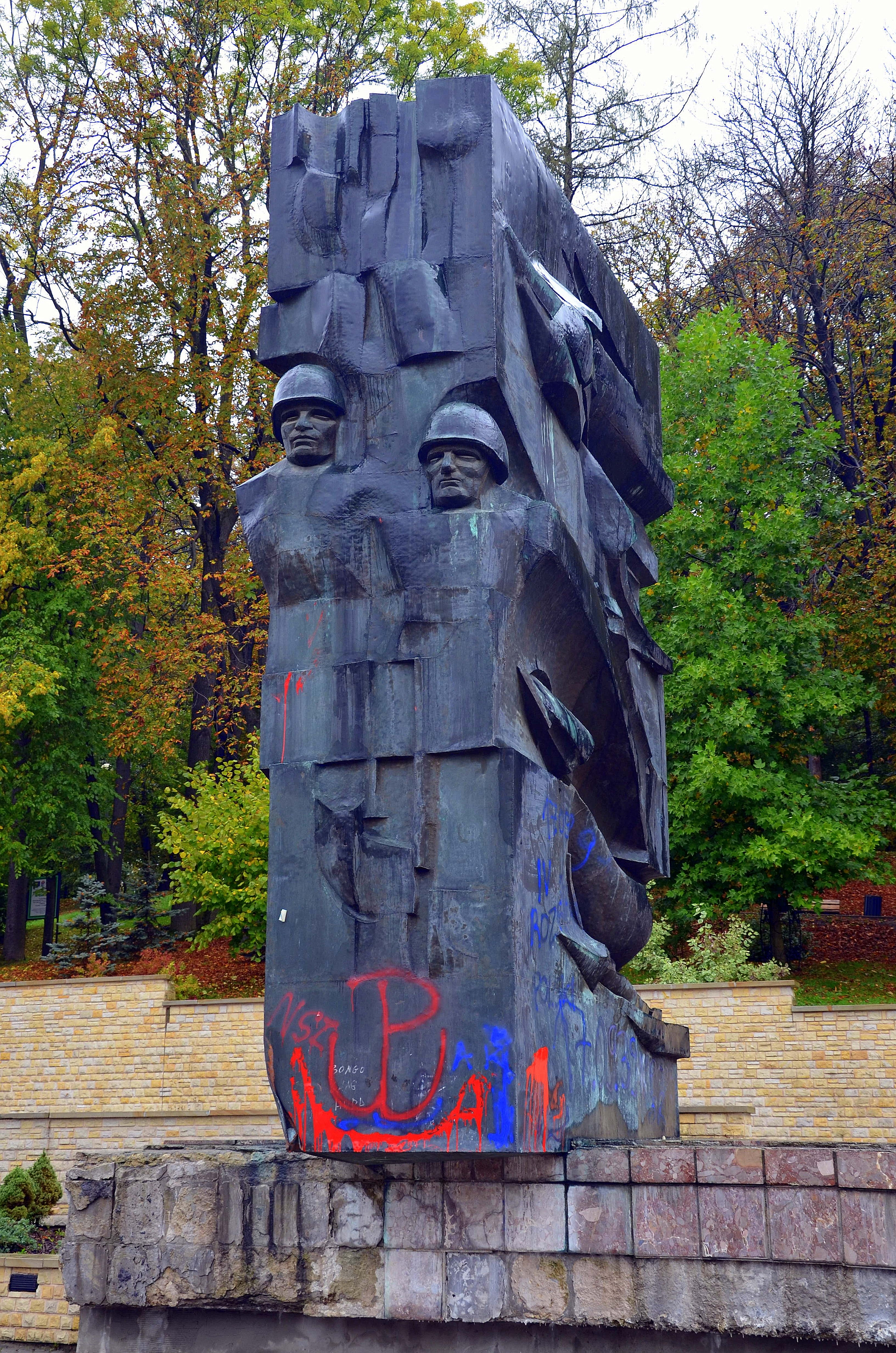
- Monument of Gratitude to the Red Army Soldiers (2013)
- Interactive map of Monument of Gratitude to the Red Army Soldiers
- Location: Father Zdzisław Peszkowski Scouts Square, Sanok, Poland
- Coordinates: 49°33′40.7″N 22°12′9″E
- Designer: Jan Krug, Wojciech Firek, Andrzej Getter, Józef Sękowski
- Type: Statue on a pedestal
- Opening date: 16 November 1977
- Restored date: 1990
- Dismantled date: 15 September 2016

The Monument of Gratitude to the Soldiers of the Red Army (Polish: Pomnik Wdzięczności Żołnierzom Armii Czerwonej), also known as the Monument of Liberation, was a monument in Sanok, Poland, existing from 1977 to 2016. It was intended as a tribute to the soldiers of the Red Army who died during the capture of the city in 1944, at the end of World War II. The monument was located at Father Zdzisław Peszkowski Scouts Square at the eastern entrance to the Adam Mickiewicz Park, facing Adam Mickiewicz Street.

== History ==
The first Monument of Gratitude to the Soldiers of the Red Army was erected in Sanok in late 1944 or early 1945. It was built near another memorial, as Nazi authorities had established a monument in 1941 to honor German soldiers who died during the capture of the Molotov Line in June 1941, at the start of the German invasion of the Soviet Union. The inscription read: "Zur Erinnerung an den 22. Juni 1941 Festungs-Pionierstab 24 Vorm. Oberbaustab 33. 1940-1942". The Soviet monument incorporated a dome from a Soviet bunker in Krzywuła near Lesko. After the war, the metal letters of the German inscription were removed. This monument was dismantled in 1957.

From August 1944, Adam Mickiewicz Hill became the site of initial burials of Soviet soldiers. The deceased were buried in shallow, disorganized coffins, with blood plasma leaking from them. The graves were marked with wooden memorials resembling miniature oil derricks topped with five-pointed stars. The markers were painted red, while those for Muslim soldiers were painted green. This war cemetery was located on the hillside above the current monument's site. In 1945, a monument was erected as an integral part of this necropolis.

The monument was intended to express gratitude for the alleged liberation of Sanok from the German occupation. The initial Monument of Gratitude to the Soldiers of the Red Army was established in 1947. Subsequently, an obelisk was erected in 1951 at the site of a military burial, commemorating Soviet soldiers who died in frontal battles in 1944. The monument was clad with black marble slabs taken from the tenement at 23 3 Maja Street. Four plaques bore inscriptions in Polish and Russian. A red star was placed at the top of the monument.

In 1952 and 1953, the bodies of Soviet soldiers were exhumed and transferred to a designated section of the Central Cemetery on Rymanowska Street.

Rallies were held in front of the monument to commemorate the anniversary of the Polish Committee of National Liberation, the formation of the Red Army, the Soviet Army, Victory Day, the German invasion of Poland on 1 September, 1 May, the anniversaries of Sanok's liberation from German occupation, and the October Revolution. The monument's reconstruction was carried out through community efforts.

In late 1976, work began on a new monument. A plaster model was created, and the monument was forged from copper sheet, with copper scrap collected from schools for this purpose. The project was led by Jan Krug from the Jan Matejko Academy of Fine Arts in Kraków. The monument, made of patinated copper sheet, was designed by Wojciech Firek, Andrzej Getter, and Józef Sękowski. The monument was erected in 1977 at the site of the previous one. It was unveiled on 16 November 1977 during a ceremony attended by the Soviet Consul General in Kraków, Ivan Korczma, Brigadier General Tadeusz Sroczyński, and local authorities, including Władysław Kruczek (who delivered a speech), Kazimierz Balawajder, Stanisław Szczepański, who unveiled the monument, and Adolf Jakubowicz, Kazimierz Murman, Edward Biegański, and Aleksander Zgirski.

In 1977, a medal designed by Wojciech Firek was minted. Its obverse bore the inscription "In memory of the soldiers of the Red Army who fell in the battles for the liberation of Sanok", and the reverse featured an outline of the Sanok Monument of Gratitude with the text "Sanok 5 XI 1977".

Following Poland's political changes in January 1990, the part of the inscription referring directly to the Soviet state (specifically "Red Army") was removed, along with the red star, and the inscription on the pedestal was changed to: "In memory of the soldiers who fell in the battles for the liberation of Sanok". In the 1990s, letters from the inscription began to disappear. In 1998, the monument's surroundings were renovated. After the revitalization of this part of the city, the inscription was fully removed.

In September 2013, the monument's surface was damaged by being painted over. In October 2014, a group of residents demanded that the city authorities remove the monument. In late 2015, the city authorities announced plans to relocate the monument to the Museum of the Polish People's Republic in Ruda Śląska. On 5 July 2016, the Sanok City Council passed a resolution to transfer the monument to the Kraków Branch of the Institute of National Remembrance. In the vote, 16 councilors supported the resolution, four abstained, and Andrzej Woźny, president of the Sanok branch of the Association of War Invalids of the Republic of Poland, argued for keeping the monument in place. On 15 September 2016, the monument was dismantled. Russian Foreign Ministry spokesperson Maria Zakharova commented on the dismantling of monuments in Poland, stating that "Moscow will not leave this without a response".
