= Maria Skłodowska-Curie 2nd Secondary School in Sanok =

High school in Sanok, Poland

Maria Skłodowska-Curie High School
- II Liceum Ogólnokształcące w Sanoku im. Marii Skłodowskiej-Curie (Polish)
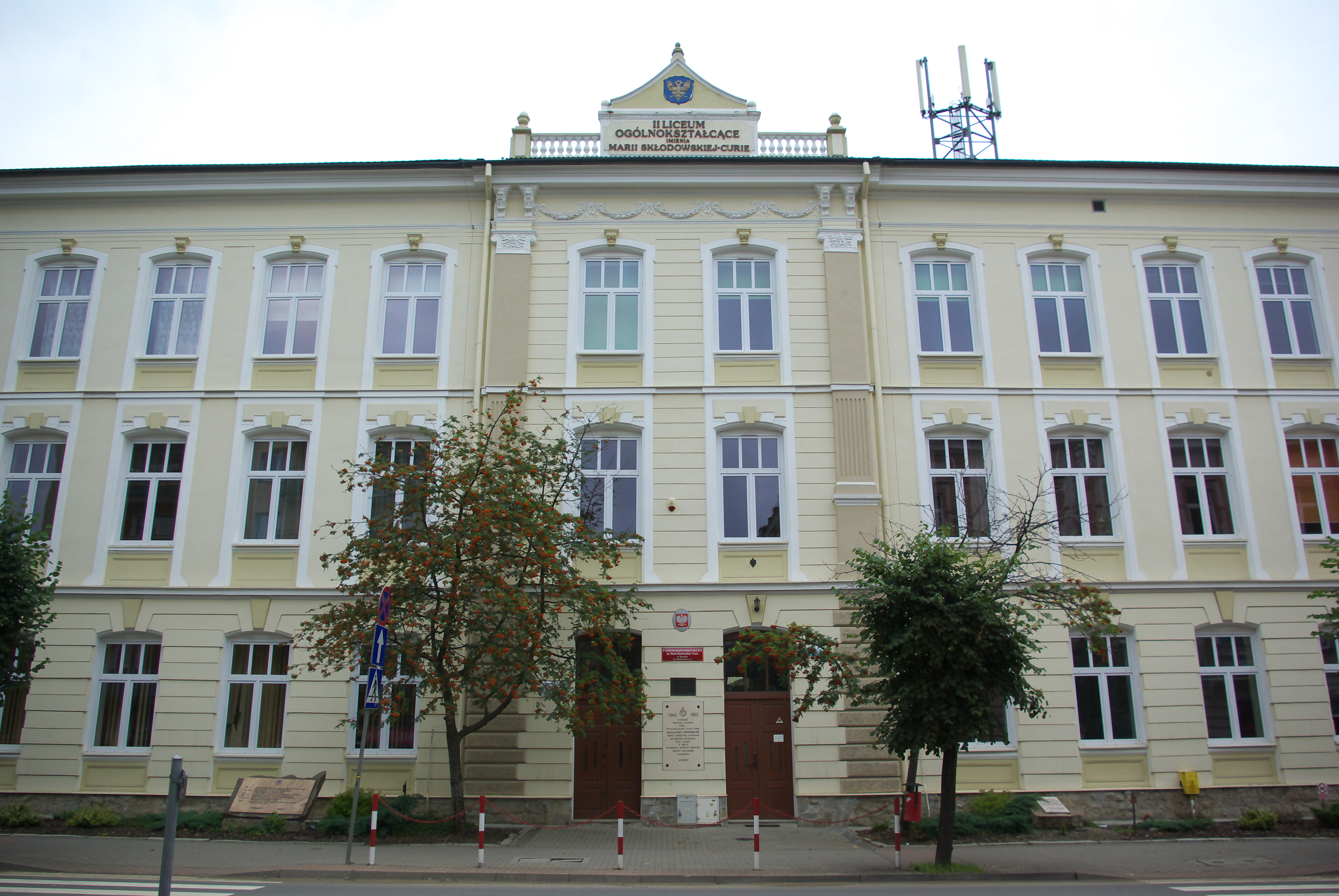
- View of the school from Adam Mickiewicz and Kazimierz Wielki streets

Location
- 11 Adam Mickiewicz Street; Sanok; Poland
- Coordinates: 49°33′39″N 22°12′8.5″E

Information
- Type: Secondary School
- Patron saint: Maria Skłodowska-Curie
- Established: 1898
- Headmaster: Magdalena Dziuban
- Website: 2lo.sanok.biz

Maria Skłodowska-Curie High School No. 2 is a secondary school located in Sanok, Poland.

== Building ==
In the mid-1890s, the decision was made to establish Nowa Street (later renamed Adam Mickiewicz Street), where a plot was purchased from Feliks Giela for the construction of the school building. In 1896, the tender for the construction of public schools was won by entrepreneur Berl Fink. Initially, architect Arnold Röhring, visiting Sanok on 6 June 1896, proposed a triangular arrangement of the school building, the Sokół movement building in Sanok, and a restaurant at the entrance to the park (now Zdzisław Peszkowski Scouts Square). The building, designed by city architect Władysław Beksiński in 1896, was constructed in the city gardens. It was originally two stories high and shaped like the letter C, listed under conscription number 311. By 1931, the building, then known as the St. Jadwiga School, was located at 9 and 11 Adam Mickiewicz Street.

During the Polish People's Republic, a fence along Adam Mickiewicz Street was removed. Before the 1975/1976 school year, the building's façades were repainted with assistance from the Municipal Housing Management Directorate. In 2008, through efforts by Sanok County authorities, the building's original façade, as designed by Beksiński in 1896, was restored, including the reconstruction of attics that had existed until 1970–1972. A major renovation was completed in 2011.

In the 1990s, the building housed the Sanok branch of the League for Nature Protection.

== History ==
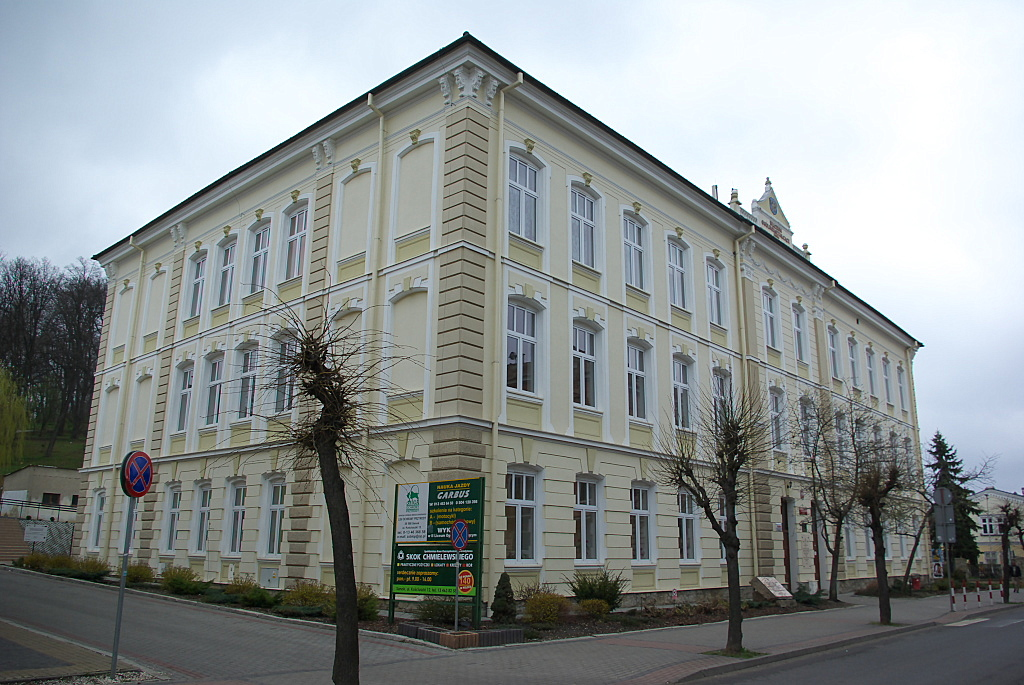
View from Adam Mickiewicz Street

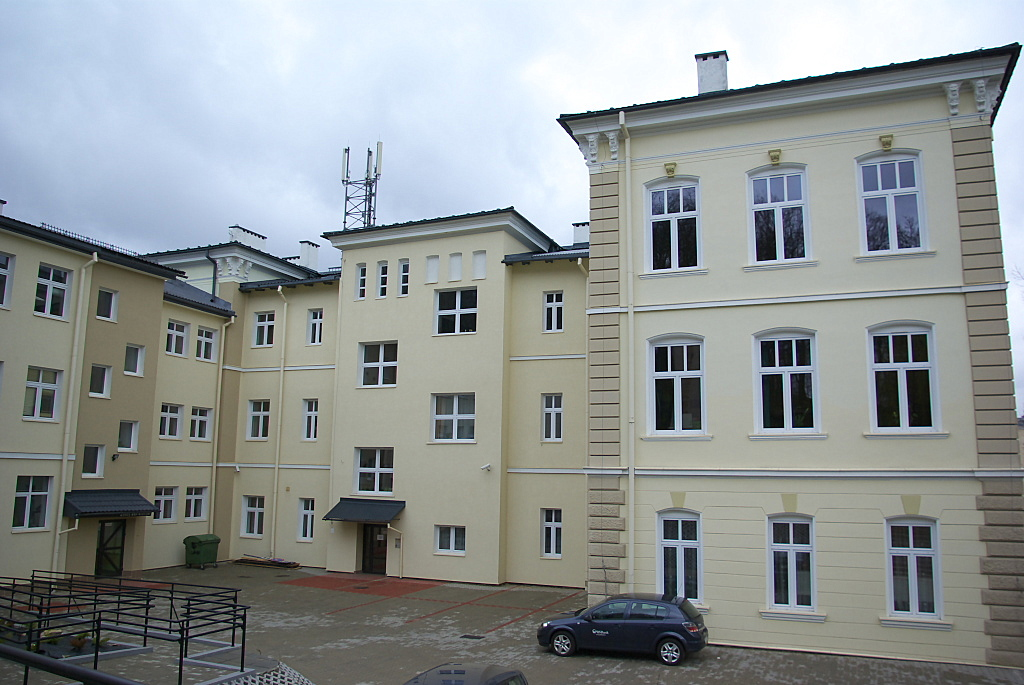
School courtyard (view from the park)

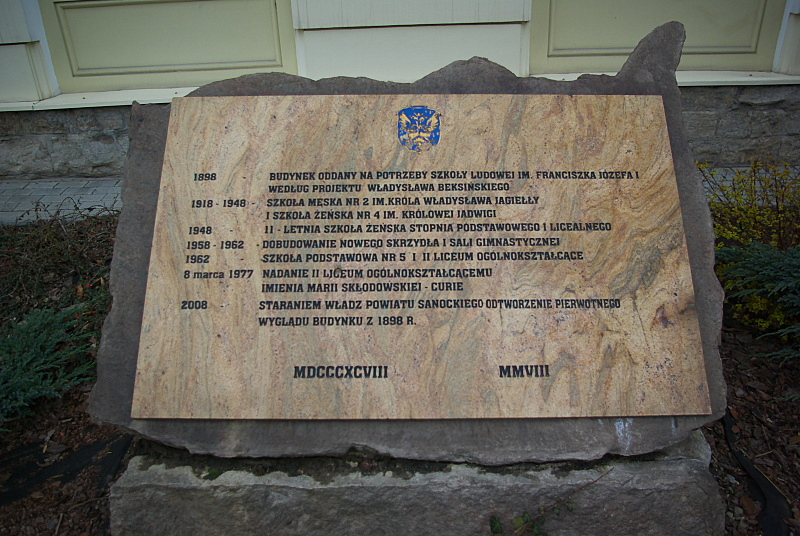
Commemorative stone marking the school's history, placed by the building

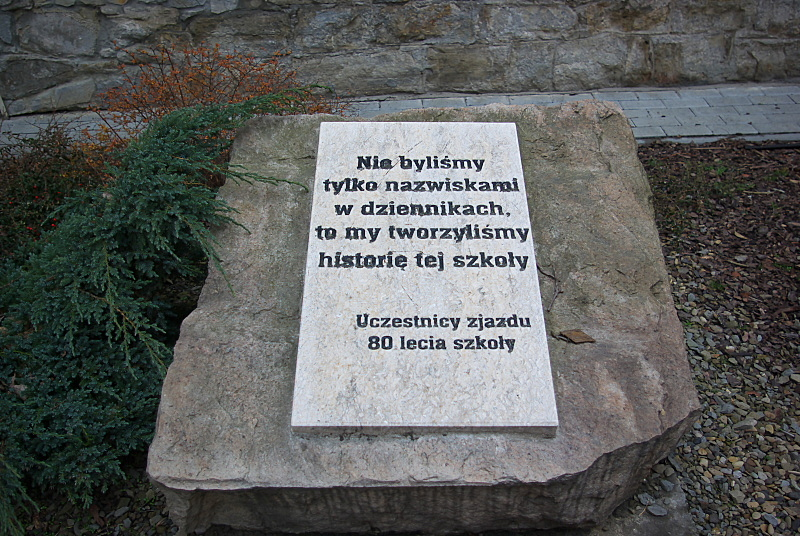
Commemorative stone erected by alumni during the 80th anniversary in 2008

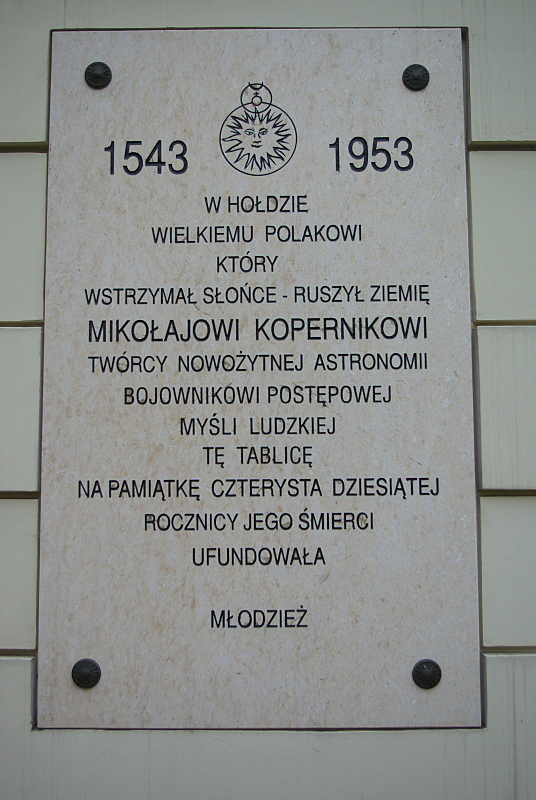
Plaque in memory of Nicolaus Copernicus

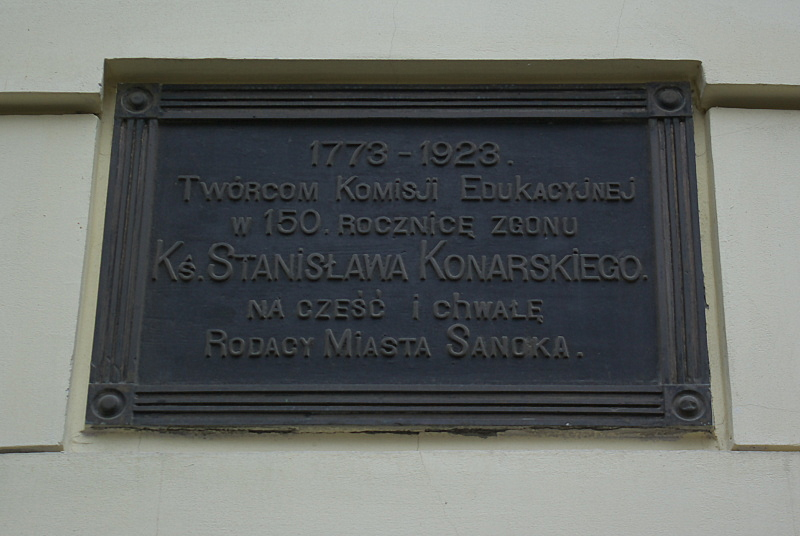
Plaque commemorating the Commission of National Education

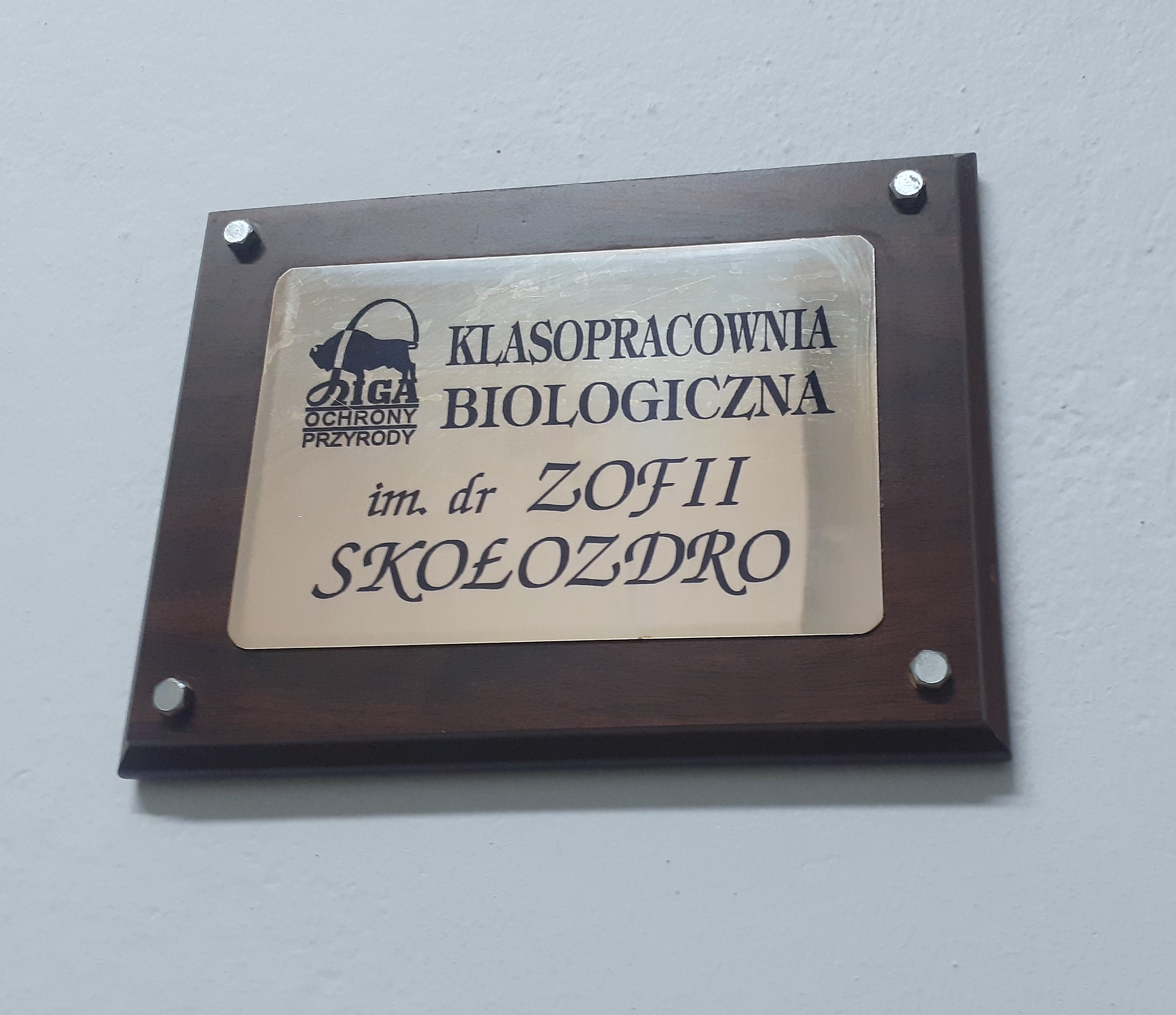
Zofia Skołozdro Biology Classroom in the school

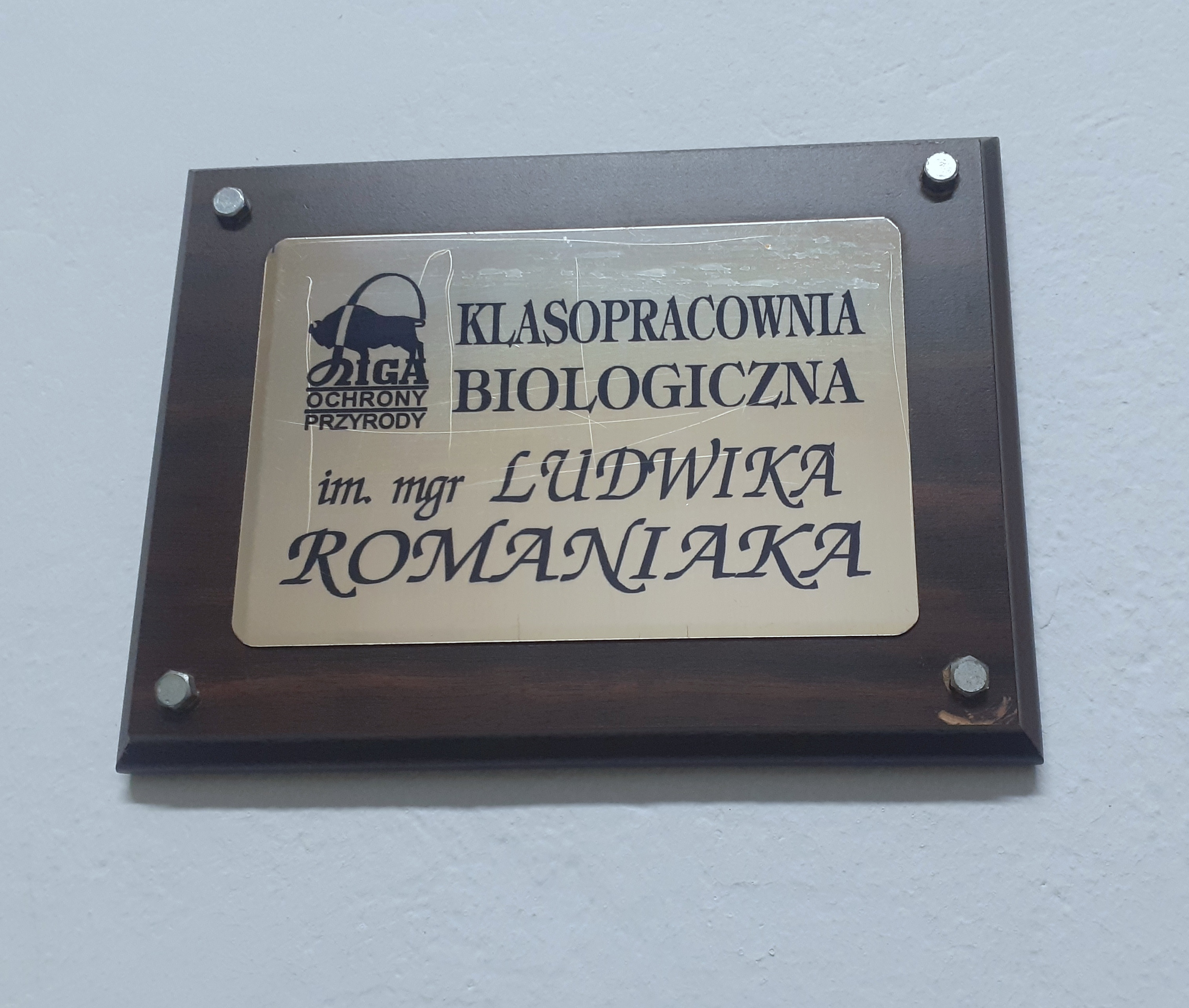
Ludwik Romaniak Biology Classroom in the school

In 1898, marking the 50th anniversary of Franz Joseph I's reign, the Sanok City Council decided to dedicate the building to house public schools. Consequently, the Emperor Franz Joseph I Public School for boys was established. It is believed that the emperor may have donated 1,000 guilders for the building's construction. In 1901, the Women's Higher Scientific Institute (also known as the Women's Higher Scientific-Educational Institute) was established at the school. On 11 November 1912, the five-grade Queen Jadwiga Girls' School No. 1 was established, with Teodozja Drewińska as headmaster until 1927. She was succeeded by Matylda Wasylewicz, who served until 1934.

By a resolution of the City Council on 2 January 1919, the Emperor Franz Joseph I Boys' Departmental School was renamed the King Władysław Jagiełło School. During the Second Polish Republic until 1948, the building housed two institutions: the King Władysław Jagiełło Boys' School No. 2 (the largest in the city, led by Stanisław Niedzielski) and the Queen Jadwiga Girls' School No. 4. The girls' gymnasium also used nearby buildings at 8 Emilia Plater Street and 36 Tadeusz Kościuszko Street (from 1932 to 1939, the site of the Emilia Plater Private Polish Girls' Gymnasium, later used as a dormitory until 1999). Before 1914, the building also housed the Industrial Supplementary School, led by Władysław Sygnarski.

After Poland regained independence and the established the Second Polish Republic, in the 1922/1923 school year, the Women's Higher Scientific Institute was replaced by the Sanok Municipal Private Women's Teacher Training Seminar. Initially located at 20 Rynek Street near the Franciscan Church, it later moved to Tadeusz Kościuszko Street and then to the Queen Jadwiga School building at Adam Mickiewicz Street. Its headmasters included Jan Killar (1923–1929), Władysław Dajewski (1929–1930), Adam Potapiński (1930–1932), and Józef Rolski (1932–1934).

During the Second Polish Republic, many girls attended the Queen Sophia Gymnasium at 5 John III Sobieski Street. To establish an independent girls' school, on 22 March 1928, the Lviv Curatorium decided to create the Emilia Plater Private Girls' Gymnasium. From 1932, the school gained public status, allowing students to take the matura exam. The student body included girls from various social and religious backgrounds. Due to strict discipline, including a uniform requirement and a 1931 educational program, the gymnasium was colloquially called a "convent", a nickname that persisted for decades. However, a 1935/1936 Lviv Curatorium inspection identified irregularities and criticized the gymnasium's operations. Consequently, headmaster Stefan Lewicki resigned after the school year, and in October 1936, Zofia Skołozdro, previously from the Zofia Strzałkowska Private Girls' Gymnasium in Lviv, took over, implementing strict disciplinary and educational measures until 1939. Following the Jędrzejewicz reform, the school operated as the Emilia Plater Private General Education Gymnasium and High School in Sanok. By the 1938/1939 school year, it held the status of a state general education gymnasium and high school.

During World War II, the building served as a German field hospital. During the German occupation of Poland, teachers, including Zofia Skołozdro and Jadwiga Zaleska, organized underground education. After the war, the building was devastated.

The 1961 education reform reorganized schooling, extending primary education to 8 grades and reintroducing 4-year general high schools. In Sanok, in 1965, Primary School No. 5 and II High School were established at Adam Mickiewicz Street, while Primary School No. 4 and I High School were set up at 5 John III Sobieski Street.

During the Polish People's Republic, the school was supported by the Sanok Modernization and Construction Plant. On 8 March 1977, the school was named after Maria Skłodowska-Curie and received a banner adorned with the Meritorious for Sanok Badge.

On 19 July 1984, a reunion celebrated the 60th anniversary of the Sanok Municipal Private Women's Teacher Training Seminar (1924–1984) and the 50th anniversary of its last matura (1934–1984).

On 2 April 1996, a scientific session marked the school's 50th anniversary, during which classroom 28 was named after Zofia Skołozdro, and the biology laboratory in classroom 30 was named after Ludwik Romaniak. The 75th anniversary was celebrated in March 2003. The 80th anniversary was celebrated on 28–29 June 2008, with approximately 1,200 alumni attending, including a Mass led by 14 priest-alumni and the oldest participant, a 91-year-old who graduated in 1935. Approximately 4,800 students had graduated over the 80 years.

In 1991, the school began a partnership with a secondary school in Sanok's sister city, Östersund, Sweden. The 50th anniversary was marked in 1995 with a scientific session on 2 April and official celebrations on 30 April.

The 2011/2012 school year was declared the Year of Maria Skłodowska-Curie at High School No. 2, coinciding with Poland's designation of the year. In November 2012, the school received the "Solidarna Szkoła 2012" title in the category for secondary schools in cities with over 20,000 residents.

== Headmasters ==
Sources:

- Teodozja Drewińska (Queen Jadwiga Girls' School No. 1)
- Stanisław Niedzielski (until 1926),
- Władysław Kreowski (1933–1939) (King Władysław Jagiełło Boys' School No. 2)
- Dr Józef Hukiewicz (until 30 November 1928)
- Dr Wincenty Jasiewicz (1 December 1928 – 31 August 1929)
- Dr Józef Hukiewicz (1929–31 August 1931)
- Stefan Lewicki (1 September 1931 – 31 August 1936)
- Dr Zofia Skołozdro (18 October 1936 – 31 August 1939)
- Dr Jan Świerzowicz (1944–1945)
- Dr Zofia Skołozdro (1946–1970)
- Stanisław Obara (1 September 1970 – 31 August 1999)
- Marek Cycoń (1 September 1999 – 2019)
- Joanna Połdiak (2019–2020)
- Marek Cycoń (2020–2025)
- Magdalena Dziuban (2025–)

== Teachers ==
- Władysław Kreowski, Franciszek Moszoro, Father Jakub Mikoś, Roman Sandecki – teachers at King Władysław Jagiełło Boys' School No. 2.
- Father Franciszek Witeszczak – catechist at Queen Jadwiga Girls' School No. 4.
- Emilia Plater Private Polish Girls' Gymnasium and Sanok Municipal Private Women's Teacher Training Seminar: Dr Aleksander Codello (history), Tadeusz Miękisz (history, geography), Józef Rolski (mathematics), Franciszek Wanic (Latin), Bolesław Briks (physics, chemistry), Dr Józef Hukiewicz, Adam Pytel (both German), Wołodymyr Czajkiwski (Ruthenian), Karol Zaleski (hygiene, biology), Jadwiga Zaleska (exercises), Marian Szajna (physical education), Matylda Wasylewicz (course supervisor), Father Franciszek Witeszczak, Father Jakub Mikoś (Roman Catholic catechists), Father Stepan Wenhrynowycz (Greek Catholic catechist), Leon Getz.
- Nestor Lenczyk (1901–1969, father of Orest Lenczyk) – mathematics, physics, astronomy teacher.
- Emilia Słuszkiewicz (1887–1982) – teacher from 1918 to 1923.
- Helena Kosina (1900–2000) – Polish teacher from 1946 to 1957.
- Maria Hrycaj (1911–2007) – biology and geography teacher from 1946.
- Dr Maria Kril – history teacher from 1959.
- Jadwiga Kubrakiewicz (1907–1978) – Polish teacher from 1946 to 1970.
- Wanda Kubrakiewicz (1912–1994) – Latin teacher from 1945 to 1954.
- Helena Grabowska – teacher and deputy headmaster in the 1960s and 1970s.
- Lech Ciuk – physical education teacher.
- Andrzej Brygidyn – historian, publisher.
- Ludwik Romaniak (1930–1990) – biology teacher.
- Jan Łuczyński – history teacher.
- Wojciech Blecharczyk (born 1962) – biology teacher.

== Students and alumni ==
Sources:

- Franciszek Ambicki (1900–1940) – State Police officer, victim of the Katyn massacre (graduate of Emperor Franz Joseph I Public School).
- Adam Antoni Bratro (1900–1920) – scout, second lieutenant in the Polish Army, died in the Polish-Soviet War, awarded the Virtuti Militari Order (attended Emperor Franz Joseph I Public School).
- Andrzej Szczudlik (1900–1971) – labor, socialist, and communist activist, Sanok County starosta, MP in the Polish People's Republic Sejm (completed grades 5–7 of a higher public school).
- Antoni Żubryd (1918–1946) – infantry non-commissioned officer, major in the National Armed Forces, commander of the Zuch Battalion (graduate of King Władysław Jagiełło Boys' School No. 2).
- Maria Hrycaj (1911–2007) – teacher, including in secret education, active in the Home Army under the codename Azalia Pontyńska, wife of Zygmunt Żyłka-Żebracki (graduate of Emilia Plater Girls' Gymnasium in 1931).
- Zofia Bandurka (1913–1993) – teacher (graduate of Emilia Plater Girls' Gymnasium in 1932).
- Danuta Kaczorowska (1914–2017) – pediatrician (graduate of Emilia Plater Girls' Gymnasium in 1932).
- Maria Stok – daughter of Franciszek Stok, liaison for the OP-23 Partisan Unit of the Home Army, died in the Auschwitz concentration camp in 1944 (graduate of Emilia Plater Girls' Gymnasium in 1934).
- Jarosława Bandera, née Opariwska (1917–1977) – wife of Stepan Bandera, athlete, member of the Organisation of Ukrainian Nationalists and Ukrainian organizations (graduate of Emilia Plater Girls' Gymnasium in 1936).
- Danuta Przystasz (1920–2019) – participant in the Warsaw Uprising, co-organizer of the Women's Action Union (graduate of Emilia Plater Girls' Gymnasium in 1938, obtained matura in secret education in Sanok on 2 January 1942).
- Paweł Kosina (1927–2013) – judge, genealogist, co-founder of the Dunin Family Association, son of Jan Józef Kosina (graduate of the high school in 1947).
- Teodozij Starak – diplomat (attended the public school before 1945).
- Janina Lewandowska, née Najsarek (born 1936) – philologist, cultural institution activist (graduate of High School No. 2 in 1954).
- Jolanta Jakima-Zerek (born 1944) – painter, illustrator, lecturer at the Rzeszów University of Technology (graduate of High School No. 2 in 1961).
- Barbara Adamiak, née Wojtowicz (born 1949) – professor of legal sciences, academic, administrative law specialist, judge at the Supreme Administrative Court of Poland (graduate of High School No. 2 in 1966).
- Jacek Chrobaczyński (born 1948) – professor of humanities, academic, specialist in modern Polish and world history (graduate of High School No. 2 in 1966).
- Ireneusz Zarzycki (born 1950) – politician, trade unionist, senator in the 3rd and 4th terms (graduate of High School No. 2 in 1968).
- Stanisław Bieleń (born 1953) – political scientist, professor of social sciences (graduate of High School No. 2 in 1972).
- Jerzy Wojtowicz (born 1952) – artist, art conservator (graduate of High School No. 2 in 1972).
- Anna Hałas, née Kafara (born 1955) – local government official, mayor of Gmina Sanok (graduate of High School No. 2 in 1974).
- Marian Kutiak (born 1956) – cultural sociologist, anthropologist, journalist, documentarian (graduate of High School No. 2 in 1975).
- Jerzy Ferdynand Adamski (born 1957) – regional historian, local government official (graduate of High School No. 2 in 1976).
- Bogdan Huk (born 1964) – journalist (attended the school from 1979 to 1982).
- Jacek Kucaba (born 1961) – sculptor, professor of visual arts (graduate of High School No. 2 in 1980).
- Tadeusz Nabywaniec (born 1964) – Polish philologist, teacher, local government official, politician, Sanok County councilor (graduate of High School No. 2 in 1984).
- Edmund Kramarz (born 1969) – long-distance runner, silver medalist at the Polish Championships in marathon (graduate of High School No. 2 in 1988).
- Artur Andrus (born 1971) – journalist, poet, songwriter, cabaret artist (graduate of High School No. 2 in 1990).
- Marek Balawajder (born 1973) – journalist, news director at RMF FM (graduate of High School No. 2 in 1992; co-published the school fanzine Więcej Czadu with Paweł Sawicki and Robert Biłas between 1992 and 1993).
- Sylwester Stabryła (born 1975) – painter, graphic artist, illustrator (graduate of High School No. 2 in 1994).
- Marek Wojnarowski – Roman Catholic priest (graduate of High School No. 2 in 1994).
- Piotr Uruski (born 1976) – doctor of historical sciences, teacher, local government official, politician, Sanok County councilor, deputy mayor of Sanok, MP in the Polish Sejm (graduate of High School No. 2 in 1995).
- Marcin Karczyński (born 1978) – mountain biker, second Sanok athlete to participate in the Olympics and first in the Summer Olympics (graduate of High School No. 2 in 1997).
- Elżbieta Mazur (born 1979) – radio journalist (graduate of High School No. 2, class of 1997).
- Anna Ryniak (born 1980) – mountain biker, bronze medallist at the 1997 Polish Junior Mountain Biking Championships, national team member (student of High School No. 2).
- Maciej Kandefer – accordionist (graduate of High School No. 2, class of 1999).
- Edyta Bieńczak – radio journalist (graduate of the school, class of 2003).
- Maciej Bielec (born 1995) – ice hockey player.
- Konrad Ćwikła (born 1995) – ice hockey player.
- Kamil Olearczyk (born 1995) – ice hockey player.
- Radosław Sawicki (born 1995) – ice hockey player.
- Piotr Naparło (born 1996) – ice hockey player.

== Commemorations ==
=== Commemorative plaques ===
- A plaque commemorating the Commission of National Education and Stanisław Konarski, with the inscription: "1773–1928 To the creators of the Education Commission on the 150th anniversary of the death of Father Stanisław Konarski, in honour and glory – the compatriots of the town of Sanok". It was funded by the people of Sanok and unveiled in 1923.
- A commemorative plaque honouring Nicolaus Copernicus, established on the 410th anniversary of his death (1543–1953). The inscription reads: "1543 1953. In tribute to the great Pole who stopped the Sun and moved the Earth, to Nicolaus Copernicus, the founder of modern astronomy, a fighter for progressive human thought, this plaque was funded by the youth to commemorate the 410th anniversary of his death". It was unveiled in 1953, funded by the youth.
- A plaque dedicated to the memory of Wojciech Słodkowski, co-founder of Sanok's journalism camps. It was unveiled on 16 September 2013 and funded by the Sanok County Office. The plaque includes Słodkowski's motto: "If you want to know – ask", his photograph, and a short biography.

== Awards ==
- Medal and diploma awarded by the Main Committee of the Biological Olympiad (1982)
- "Jubilee Address" (1984)

== Bibliography ==
- Księga pamiątkowa 1928-2008 II Liceum Ogólnokształcącego im. Marii Skłodowskiej-Curie w Sanoku wydana z okazji jubileuszu 80-lecia szkoły [Commemorative Book 1928–2008 of the Maria Skłodowska-Curie Second General High School in Sanok, Published on the Occasion of the School's 80th Anniversary] (in Polish). 2008.
