= Sanok City Hall =

CIty hall building in Sanok, Poland

- Ratusz w Sanoku (Polish)
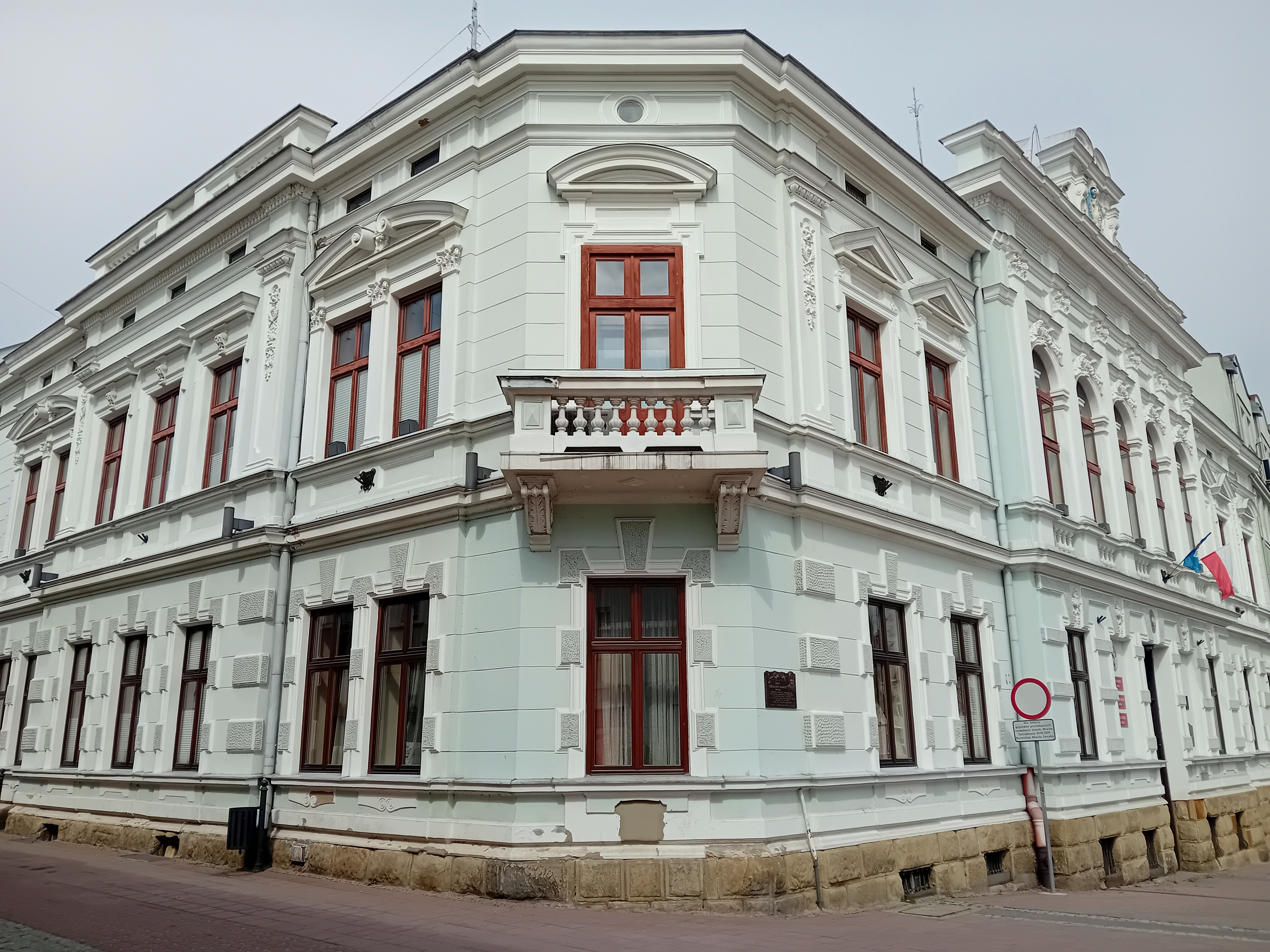
- View of both walls of the building at the south-eastern side of the Market Square
- Interactive map of the Sanok City Hall area

General information
- Type: Tenement
- Architectural style: Eclecticism
- Location: 1 Rynek Street, Sanok, Poland
- Coordinates: 49°33′40″N 22°12′22.2″E
- Construction started: 1875
- Completed: 1880
- Owner: Sanok County

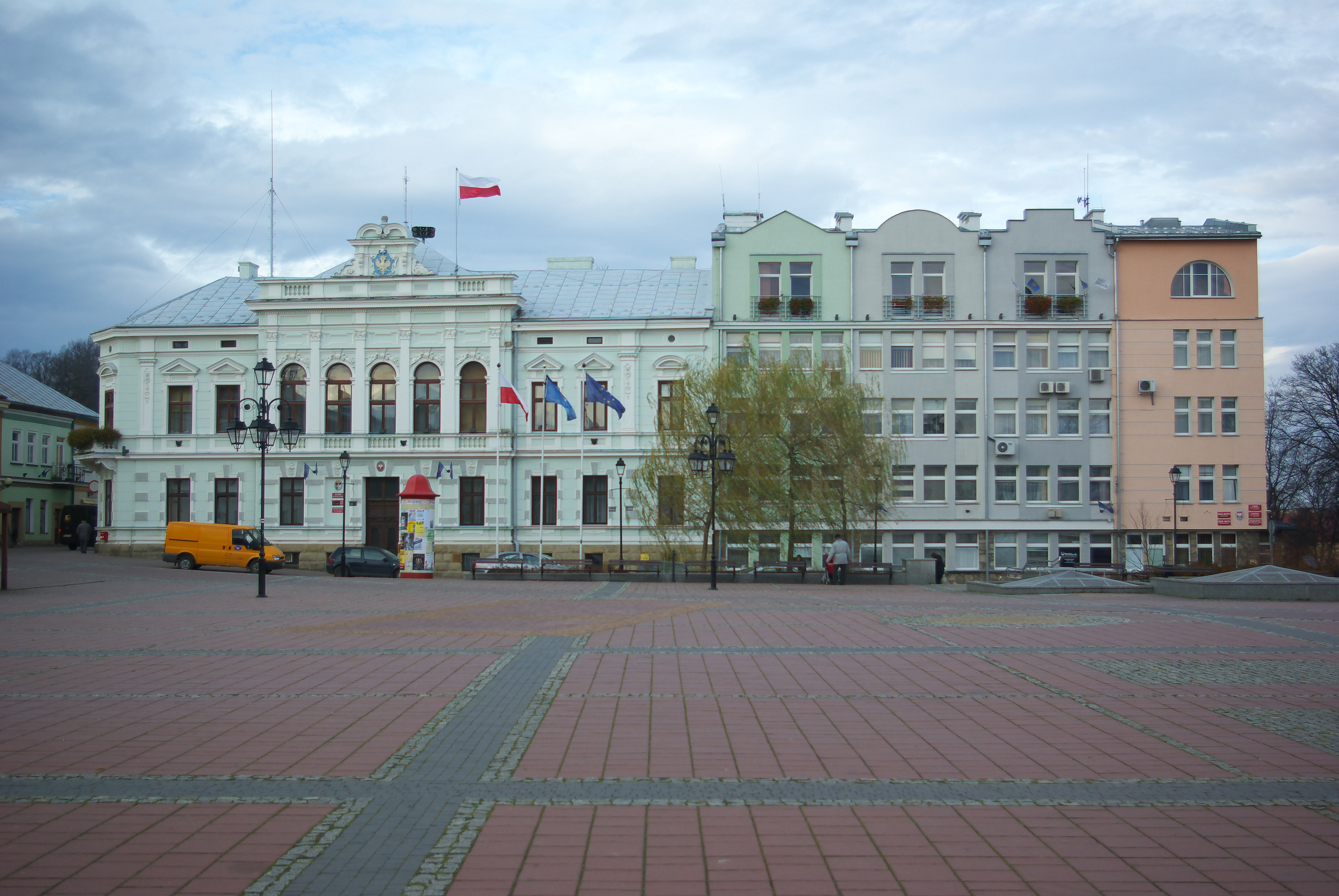
View from the eastern side

The Sanok City Hall is a historic municipal building in Sanok, Poland, located at 1 Rynek Street.

Originally, the City Hall was housed in a building at 16 Rynek Street. Both structures are situated opposite each other in Sanok's Market Square.

== History ==
This eclectic building was constructed between 1875 and 1880 under the administration of the Austro-Hungarian Empire to serve as the seat of the Sanok County Council. In October 1895, an emblem depicting a falcon in flight was placed at the top of the front façade. The building was officially consecrated on 26 March 1896. On 25 August 1900, the building was visited by Leon Piniński, the Steward of the Kingdom of Galicia and Lodomeria, during an inspection of the county administration. Initially, the building was registered under number 104, later changed to 1 Rynek Street.

During the 1930s, in the Second Polish Republic, the building housed the meeting hall of the Sanok County Council and the County Administration Office. Until the early 1930s, it was listed under the address 214 Rynek Street. Additionally, the building was home to the Sanok County Communal Savings Bank. Until 1939, the corner of the building housed the Pod (Złotą) Gwiazdą pharmacy, owned by Jan Hipolit Hrabar (1891–1945), which had been operating there since 1922.

Following the outbreak of World War II and the German occupation, the pharmacy was renamed Ap.(otheke) zum Stern. In 1940, its owner, Hrabar, was arrested and sent to the Auschwitz concentration camp. He died in 1945 at the Bergen-Belsen concentration camp. After the war, Hrabar's wife unsuccessfully attempted to revive the pharmacy. The former corner entrance to the pharmacy is now a window with a mailbox below. During the occupation, under the renamed address 1 Adolf-Hitler-Platz, the building served as the headquarters of the German county administration unit Kreishauptmannschaft – Landkreis Sanok.

During the Polish People's Republic, the building housed the Presidium of the County National Council. At the time, it was located at 2 October Revolution Square, earning it the nickname "Presidium". Between 1965 and 1967, a new three-story section was added to the northern side of the building.

Originally, the building's façade was painted in shades of yellow. A two-part gate was constructed, with a handle designed to resemble a lion's head. From July to September 2006, the building underwent renovations, including window replacement and roof painting. The façade was repainted in white and celadon tones, a color scheme designed to harmonize with other buildings in the market square. During this period, a fourth floor was added to the newer northern section.

The building is listed in both the provincial (A-1395, 12 July 2016) and municipal Registry of Cultural Property.

== Commemorative plaques and memorials ==
On the front façade, near the main entrance, several commemorative plaques are displayed:

- A plaque marking the 80th anniversary of the rebirth of the Polish Republic in 1918, commemorating those who died for the homeland. Unveiled on 11 November 1998 by Krosno Voivode Bogdan Rzońca and Sanok Mayor Edward Olejko. It was consecrated by Father Feliks Kwaśny. The inscription reads: "To the eternal memory of those who answered the call of the homeland in times of need and sacrificed their health and lives on its altar. On the 80th anniversary of the rebirth of the Republic, grateful Sanok residents".
- A plaque commemorating the centennial of the establishment of the Sanok Beautification Society in 1904, unveiled on 14 November 2004 during the 100th anniversary celebrations of the Society of Friends of Sanok and the Sanok Land.
- A plaque commemorating Czesława Kurasz (1938–2023), unveiled on 7 March 2024.
