= Tadeusz Kościuszko Monument, Sanok (1902–1941) =

Monument to Tadeusz Kościuszko in Sanok, Poland

Tadeusz Kościuszko Monument in Sanok (1902–1941)
- Pomnik Tadeusza Kościuszki w Sanoku (Polish)
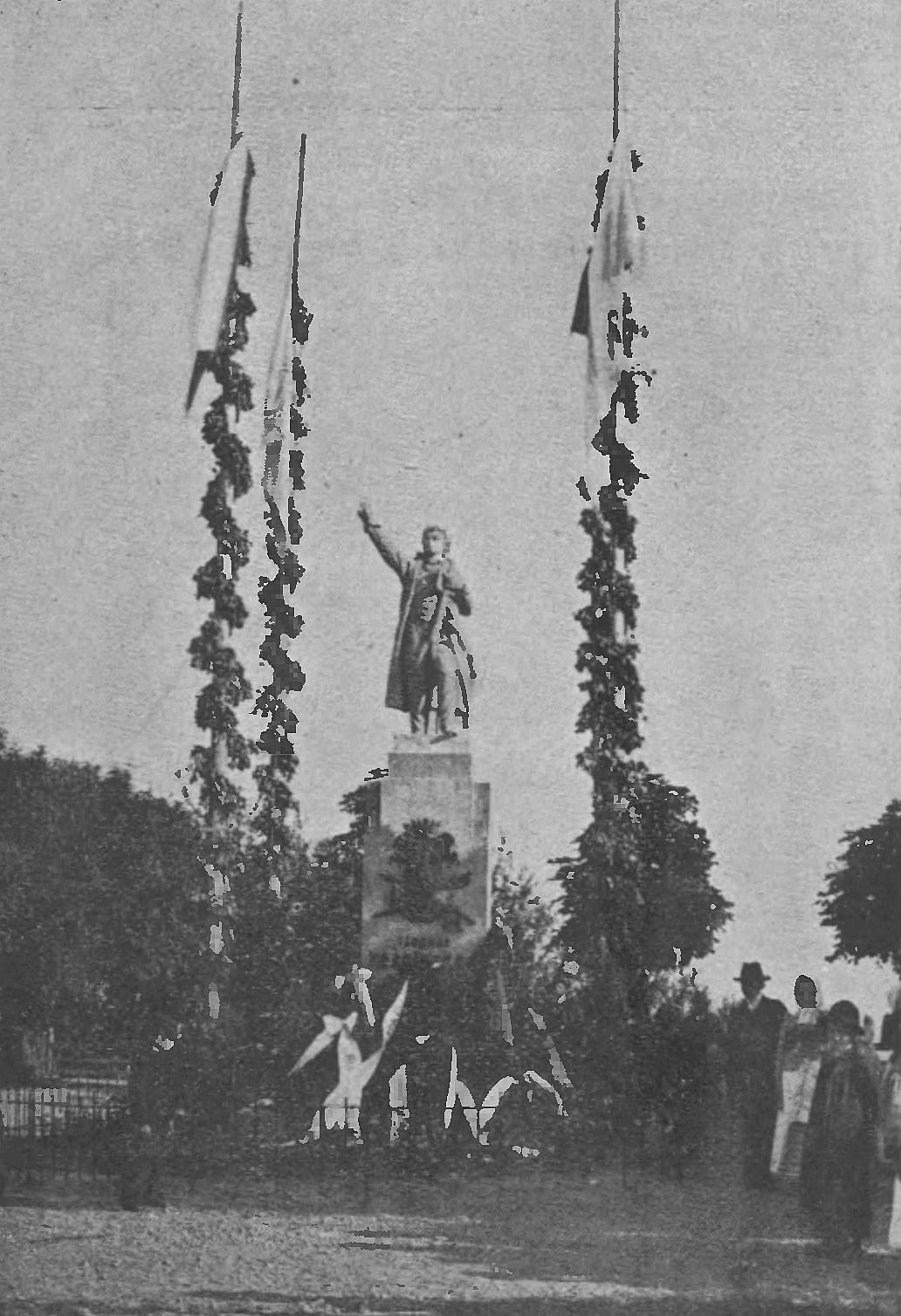
- The monument on its unveiling day 28 September 1902
- Interactive map of Tadeusz Kościuszko Monument in Sanok (1902–1941)
- Location: Sanok, St. John's Square
- Coordinates: 49°33′40.3″N 22°12′28.8″E
- Designer: Julian Markowski (statue); Teodor Talowski (pedestal)
- Type: Statue on a pedestal
- Opening date: 28 September 1902
- Dismantled date: 22 April 1941

The Tadeusz Kościuszko Monument was a monument commemorating Tadeusz Kościuszko in Sanok, Poland, existing from 1902 to 1941.

== History ==
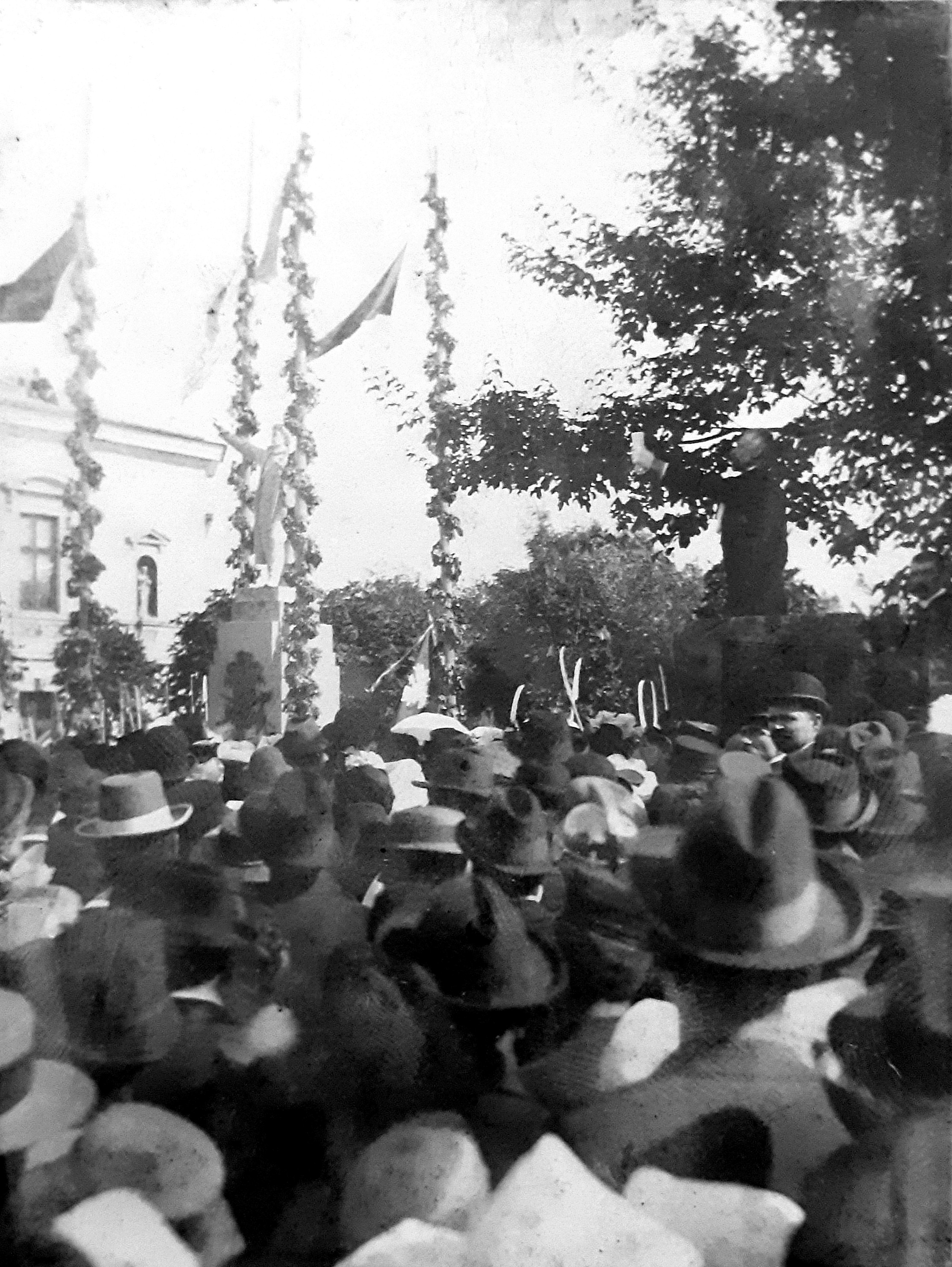
Karol Zaleski (right) speaking at the monument's unveiling

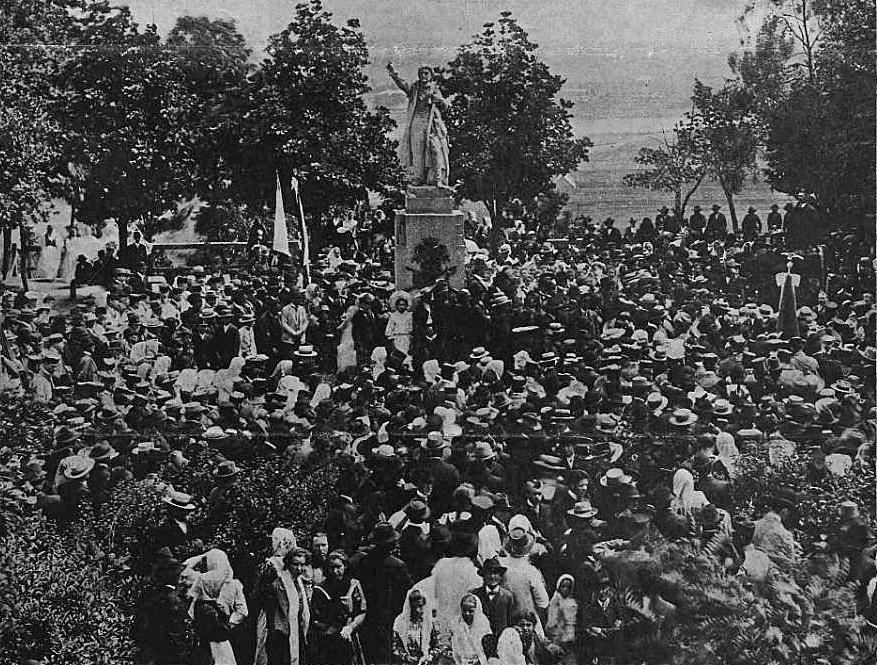
Commemoration of the Battle of Grunwald in Sanok in 1907

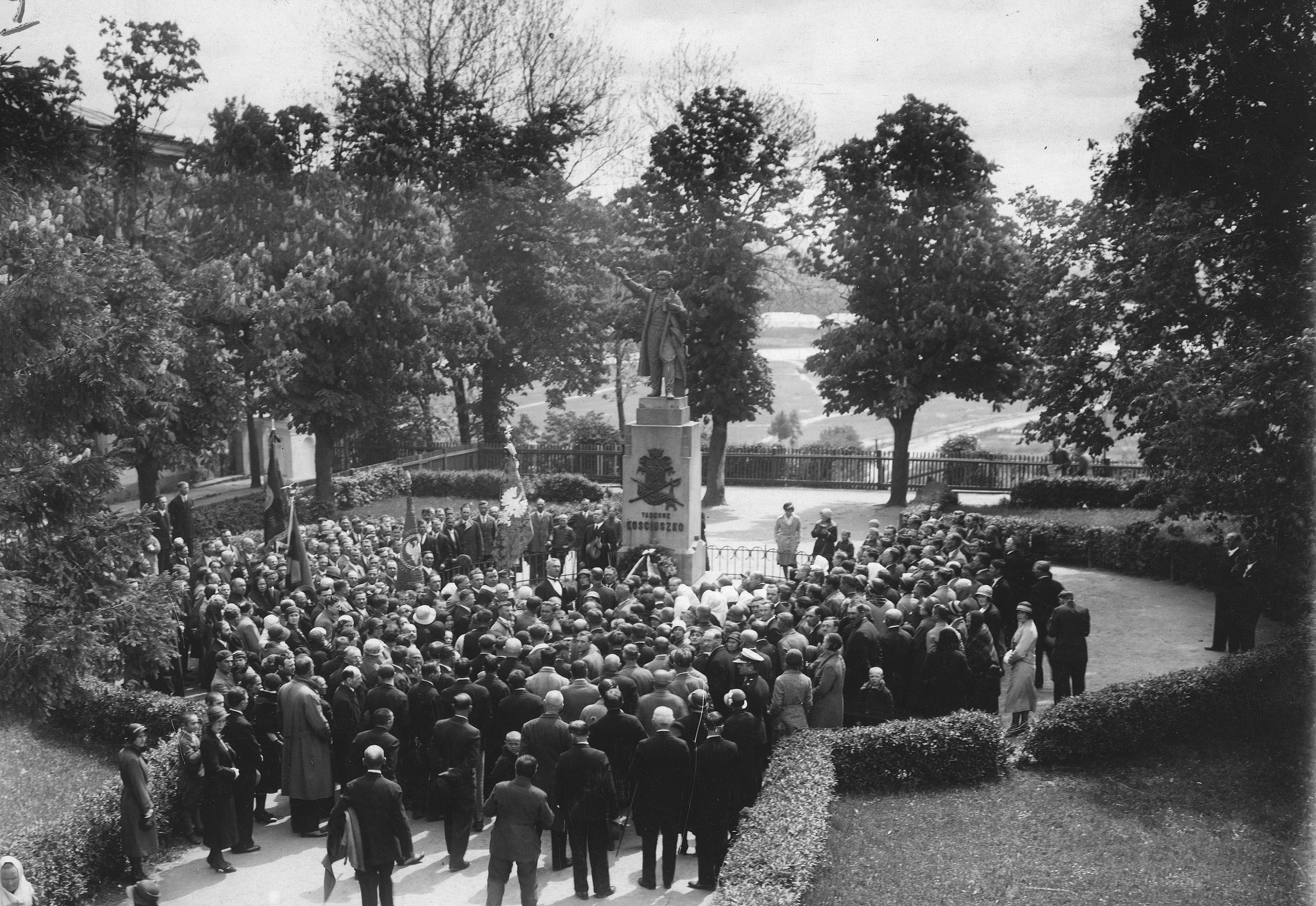
Ceremonies at the monument before 1939

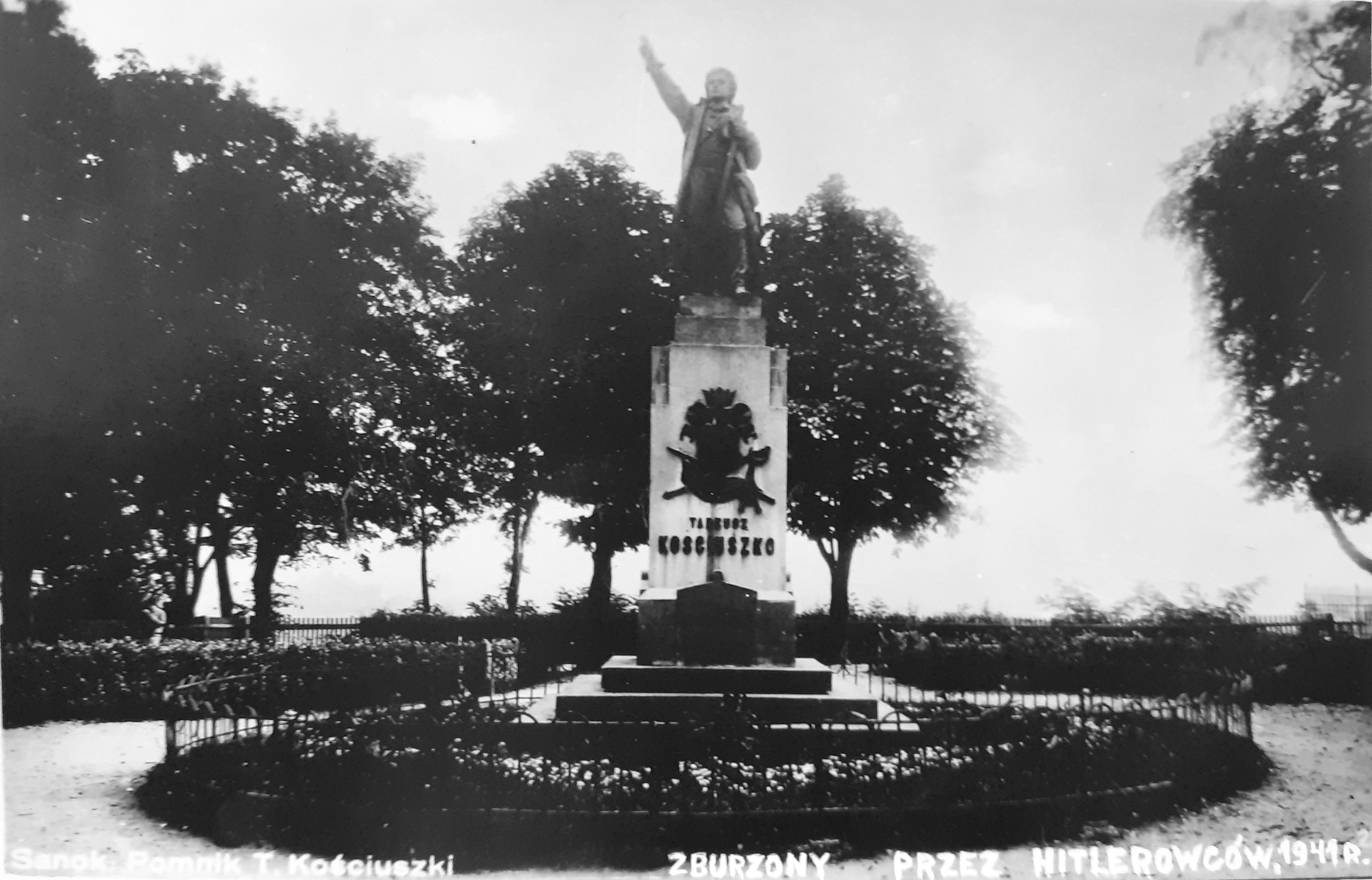
Monument on a postcard

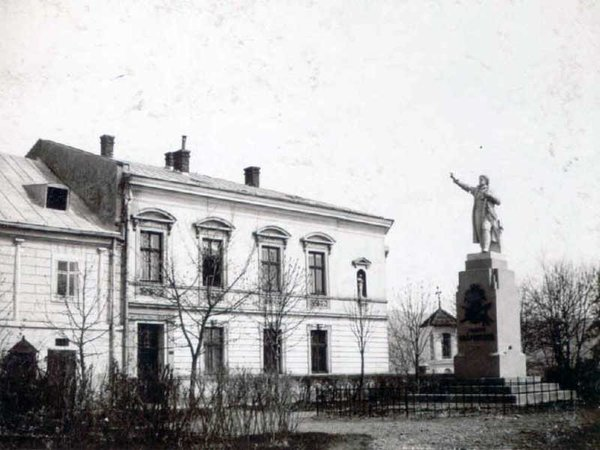
View of the monument and the Zaleski house

The idea for the first Tadeusz Kościuszko monument in Sanok originated in 1894 when the Sanok City Council decided to commemorate the centennial of the Battle of Racławice. On 15 March 1894, the council passed a resolution to rename Krakowska Street to Tadeusz Kościuszko Street and approved the erection of a monument in St. John's Square, allocating 100 PLN for the project. This initiative led to the decision to build the monument. A press report from the Kościuszko celebrations in Sanok on 1 April 1894 noted that "on Wednesday, 4 April, the program will continue with the illumination of the city and a torchlight procession to the Kościuszko monument in St. John's Square, accompanied by local music", suggesting a monument may have already existed. During these celebrations, Krakowska Street was officially renamed Tadeusz Kościuszko Street. Additionally, the lower part of Żydowska Street was renamed Berek Joselewicz Street, and residents were urged to illuminate their windows on 4 April 1894, the anniversary of the battle.

The proposal to establish the monument was renewed in 1897. Aital Witoszyński, who became mayor in 1898, purchased land in St. John's Square. On 3 May 1900, the City Council allocated space in St. John's Square and authorized the provision of stone from the city quarry. In addition to the city's funding, a public fundraising campaign was conducted. Donors included Feliks Giela, and Aital Witoszyński provided financial support. Funds were collected in Sanok and nearby areas, such as Mrzygłód. The monument construction committee was chaired by Dr. Karol Zaleski. Zaleski later noted that the monument was placed in St. John's Square "over the cellars of some former new house". However, on 11 October 1901, the committee proposed the Market Square (adjacent to St. John's Square) as an alternative location for better visibility. To enhance the monument's prominence, permission was granted to remove trees and shrubs from the square.

In 1899, Antoni Popiel submitted a design for the monument. A competition for the statue's design was won by Lviv sculptor Julian Markowski, who created the work. His design was presented to the committee on 21 February 1900. The pedestal was designed by Teodor Talowski. The construction committee was led by Sanok's municipal engineer Władysław Beksiński, with other local engineers and builders, including Wilhelm Szomek, Karol Gerardis, and Władysław Adamczyk, contributing to the review process. The statue was carved from Połoniec stone, and the pedestal was made from Odrzykoń stone by a Krosno stonemason, Wojciech Wojtowicz. The pedestal featured a bronze emblem of the Polish eagle in a crown, along with a saber and lance, with the inscription "Tadeusz Kościuszko" cast at the local Wagon and Machine Factory. By mid-1902, a quadrangular stone pedestal was prepared at the site. Stonework was supported by sculptor Józef Aszklar (pedestal base), Lviv mason Jan Nowotarski, and Kraków craftsmen J. Górecki and J. Szopski, who constructed the iron fence around the monument.

A celebration committee, chaired by former Sanok mayor Cyryl Jaksa Ładyżyński, was formed. On 31 August 1902, Sanok commemorated the Battle of Grunwald, organized by engineer Władysław Ostrowski. The monument's unveiling took place on 28 September 1902. The event drew not only city residents but also rural communities from the surrounding areas. Participants gathered at the Sokół movement building before processing through the city streets. The procession included 112 mounted riders, 60 scythemen in uhlans' uniforms, representatives from the local gymnasium, Sokół movement, the city council, artisans, and girls in Kraków costumes. After a mass and sermon by the guardian of the local Franciscan monastery, Father Alojzy Karwacki, the procession proceeded to St. John's Square. The statue, depicting Kościuszko during his oath on 24 March 1794 in Kraków's market square, was placed in the northern corner of St. John's Square. The figure showed Kościuszko with his right hand raised in the oath and his left holding a saber. The monument was enclosed by a low iron fence. The ceremony was led by Sanok physician Dr. Karol Zaleski, who lived nearby at the Zaleski Villa, and delivered a speech. The monument was unveiled, and Father Jan Trznadel performed its consecration. Speeches were also given by Mayor Aital Witoszyński, deputy Grzegorz Milan, and a Przemyśl Sokół movement delegate named Kosiba. After the main ceremony, festivities continued at the Sanok Sokół movement building, hosting around 400 rural representatives. At 8:00 PM, a musical and declamatory evening featured the first two scenes of the drama Kościuszko pod Racławicami by Władysław Ludwik Anczyc. Photographs of the unveiling were taken by Jakub Puretz.

In Sanok, pamphlets were published: Speech by the Chairman of the Tadeusz Kościuszko Monument Construction Committee in Sanok, Dr. Karol Zaleski, at the Foot of the Monument During Its Unveiling on 28 September 1902 and Opening of the Kościuszko Evening at the Sanok Sokół on 23 October 1904 by Dr. Karol Zaleski (1904). The Kościuszko Monument Construction Committee was dissolved on 10 May 1904. The committee's president was Feliks Gniewosz, with vice-presidents Cyryl Jaksa Ładyżyński and Jan Gaweł, and Feliks Giela as treasurer and secretary; from 1899, Dr. Karol Zaleski served as president.

Toward the end of the Austrian Partition, St. John's Square and the monument became a gathering place for patriotic youth during national holidays, such as anniversaries of the Battle of Grunwald and the Constitution of 3 May.

After the outbreak of World War II, the monument faced demolition by the German occupiers in September 1940. Dr. Karol Zaleski, living nearby, intervened with Kreishauptmann Albert Schaar, securing a promise that the monument would remain untouched. After Zaleski's death on 20 February 1941, demolition began on 21 April 1941. Zaleski's daughter, Jadwiga Zaleska, persuaded workers to halt the process. The next morning, demolition resumed, but her intervention again delayed it. However, workers returned with Stadtkommissar Josef Märkl, who declared that the monument "irritated the Russians" and ordered its immediate destruction. The monument was demolished that day using dynamite. Its remains were discarded near the moat of the Sanok Castle, then a landfill. Following her protest, Jadwiga Zaleska was dismissed from her teaching position at the Commercial School and forced to leave the city temporarily. Her young nephew, Julian Hanus, was deported to Auschwitz concentration camp, where he died.

== Epilogue ==
In the 1990s, a remnant of the monument's pedestal remained in St. John's Square. The bronze emblem of the eagle, saber, and lance was preserved and is held in the collections of the Sanok Historical Museum.

== Bibliography ==
- Zając, Edward (1998). Szkice z dziejów Sanoka [Sketches from the History of Sanok] (in Polish). Sanok: Miejska Biblioteka Publiczna im. Grzegorza z Sanoka. ISBN 83-909787-0-9.
- Dokumentacja budowy pomnika T. Kościuszki w Sanoku: pisma, kwity, zdjęcia, szkice. 1902-1986 [Documentation of the Construction of the T. Kościuszko Monument in Sanok: Letters, Receipts, Photos, Sketches. 1902–1986] (in Polish). Archiwum Muzeum Budownictwa Ludowego w Sanoku.
