= Sanok railway station =

Railway station in Sanok, Poland

Sanok
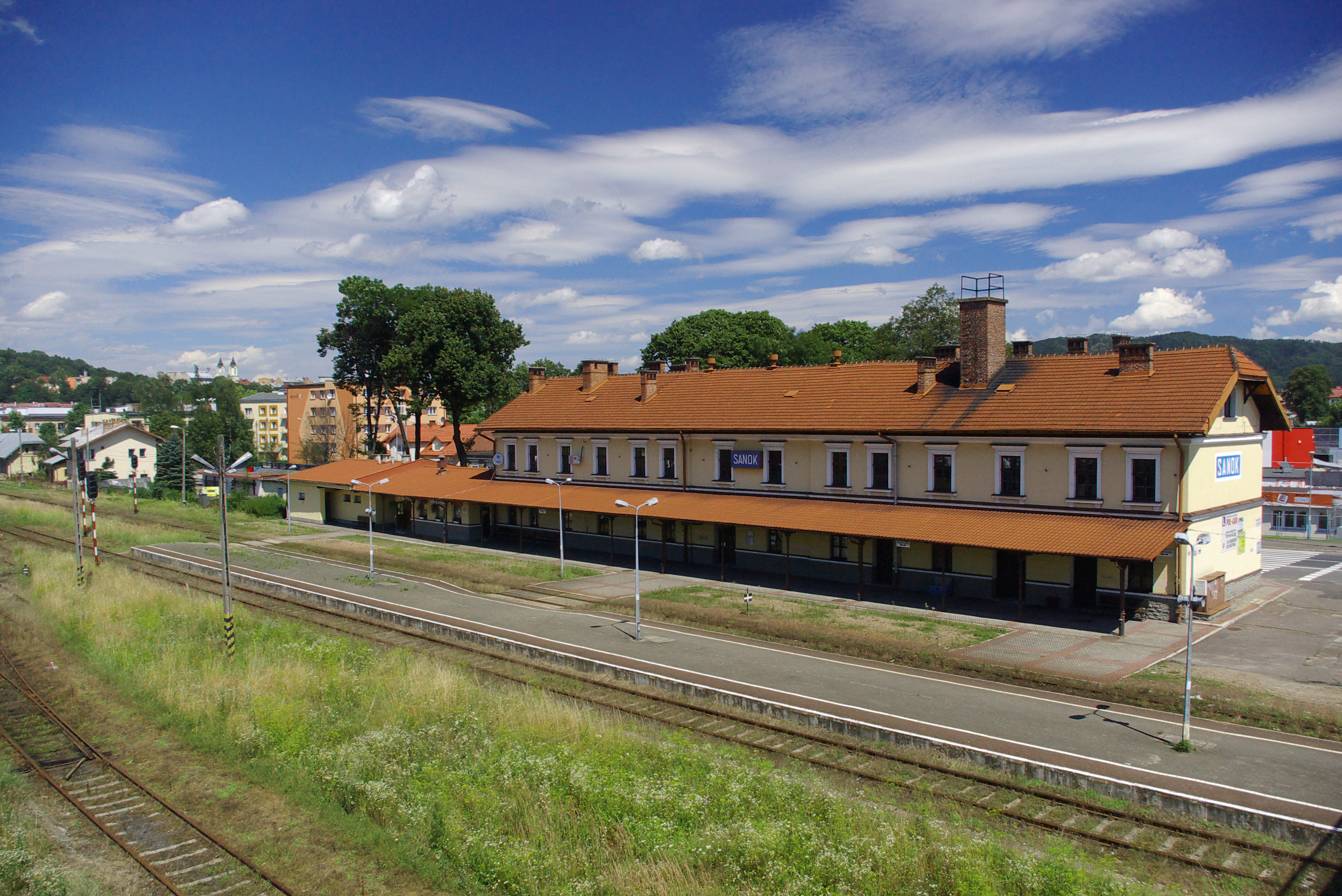
- Station grounds viewed from the overpass (2010)

General information
- Location: Sanok; Poland
- Coordinates: 49°33′11.6″N 22°12′39″E
- Platforms: 1

History
- Opened: 1884
Location

The Sanok is a railway station in Sanok, Podkarpackie Voivodeship, Poland.

== History ==
The position of station master was held by: Wilhelm Stehlik (from 1884, as an adjunct from around 1889, as an official from around 1893 to 1894), Juliusz Stampf'l (from around 1894), Eng. Feliks Wodziczko (from around 1898), Józef Trzciński (from around 1900 as construction commissioner, as senior construction commissioner from around 1906, as inspector from around 1913).

In 1913, Kolejowa Street was established, leading to the railway station. In 1917, the station was served by three train routes: Stróże–Nowy Zagórz (three times), Iwonicz–Sanok (once), and Sanok–Chyrów (once).

After World War I and Poland's regained independence in the Second Polish Republic, from 19 February 1919, the station was managed by Second Lieutenant Czesław Jamka.

In 1931, buildings along Dworcowa Street included: state railway house at no. 2 (originally at number 217), the station at no. 4 (218), the station warehouse at no. 6 (276), state railway property at no. 8 (277), and another state railway building at no. 13 (274).

After World War II, the industrial spurs were used by the Wagon Factory, Stomil, and a grain elevator.

On 10 September 1967, the PKS bus station was relocated in front of the railway station, having previously operated at October Revolution Square.

Major modernization and renovation of the station formally began in 1985, though actual work started at the turn of 1987/1988. The work continued in 1993 and was completed in 1994. During the renovation, the building's original appearance was restored. It was reopened for use on 19 May 1994.

A relief depicting the coat of arms of Sanok is located in the station's hall. The building once housed the Semafor bar.

The PKS bus station was established on the southern side of the railway station at Kazimierz Lipiński Street. An overpass above the tracks connects the railway station to the bus station. The overpass was constructed by Autosan between 1981 and 1982 and opened on 19 July 1982. It was reopened after renovations on 6 November 2001. Following further modernization, the station was reopened on 23 May 2019, with the overpass upgraded to an enclosed structure with installed elevators.

The station building was added to the municipal register of monuments in 2015.

On 20 June 2017, a plaque was unveiled on the station's front wall.

== Gallery ==
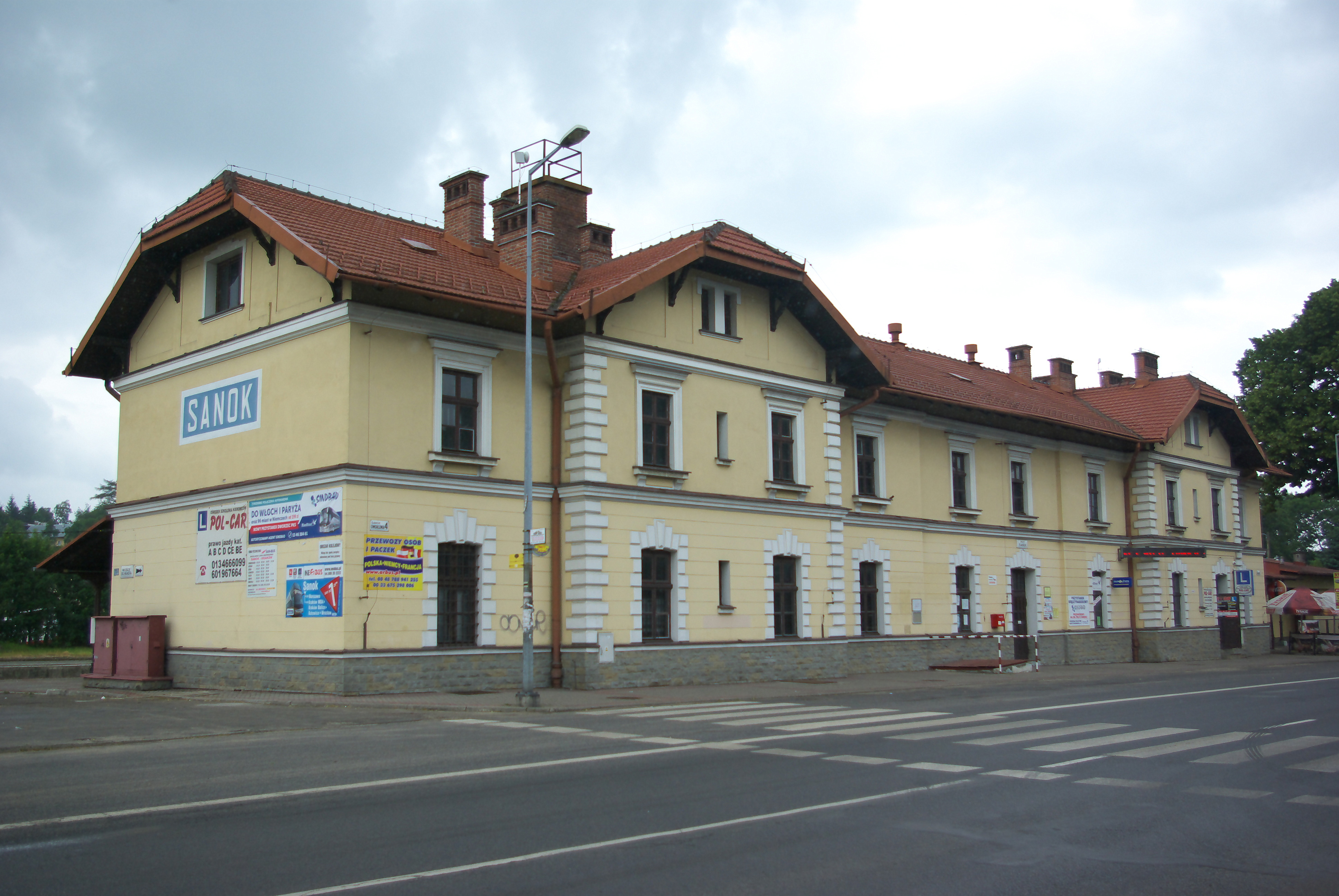
View from Dworcowa Street

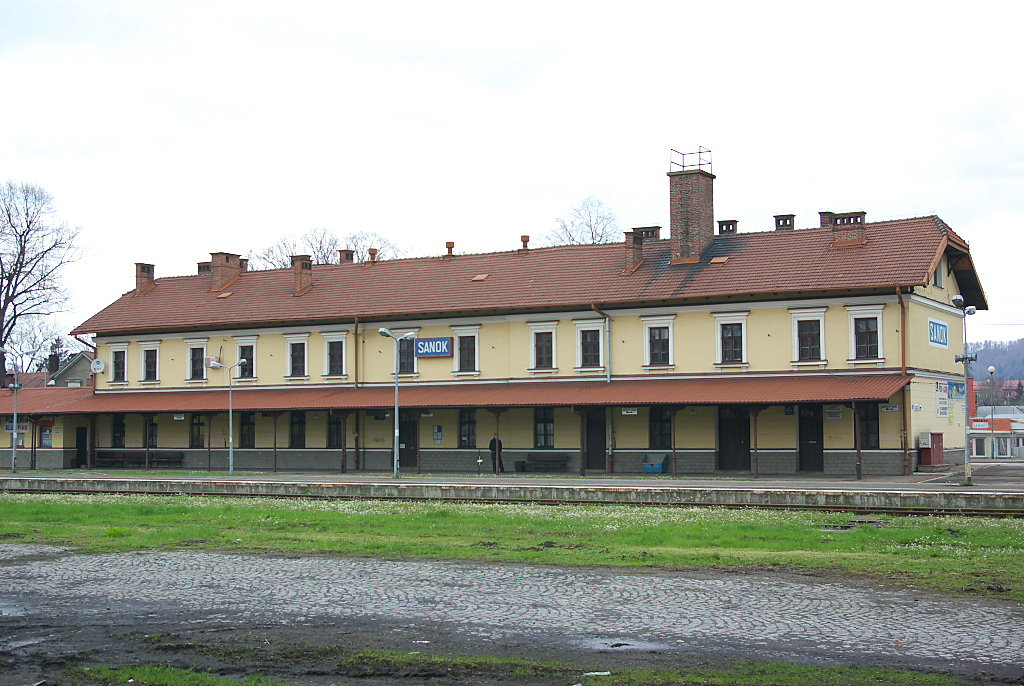
View from the south

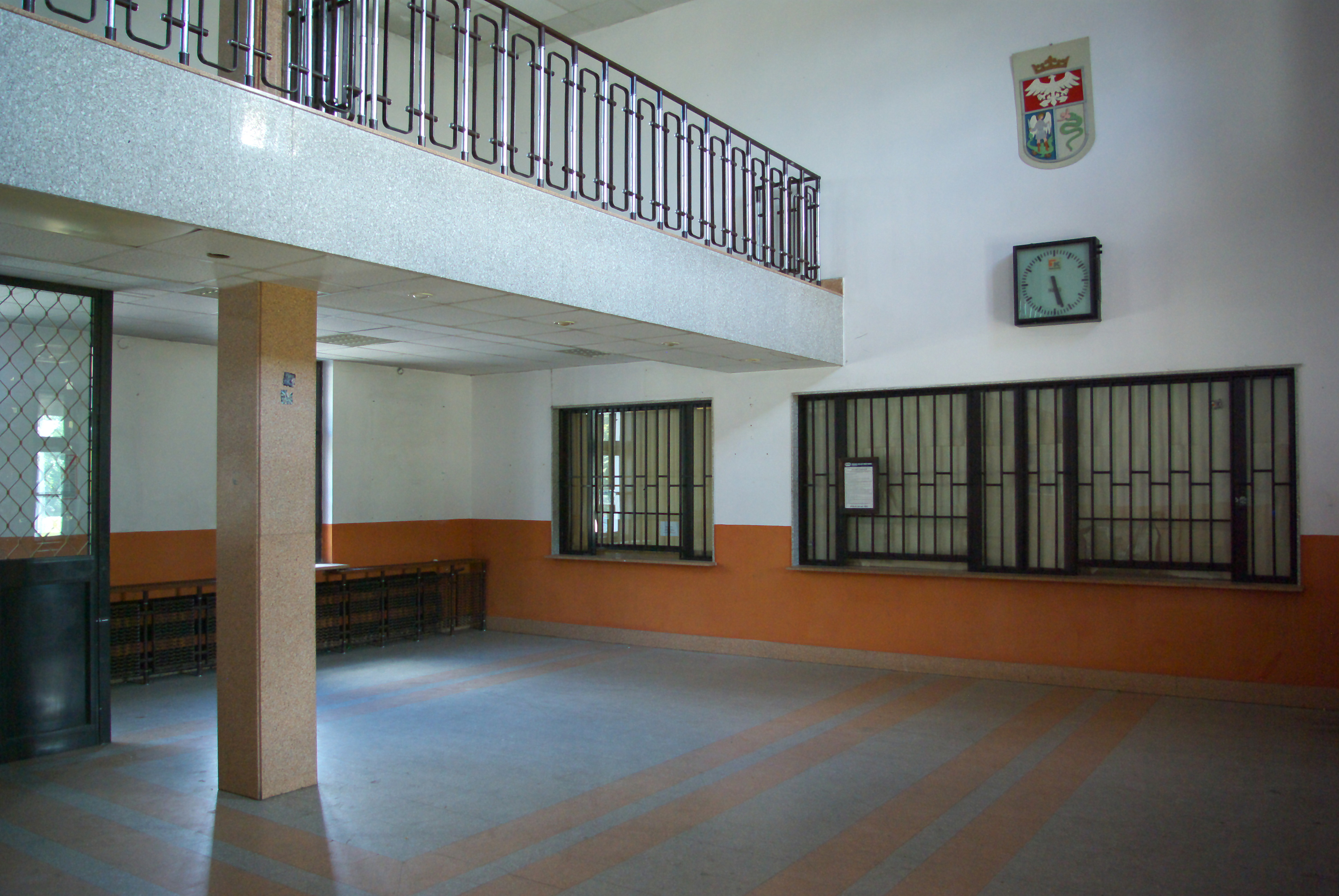
Interior of the building

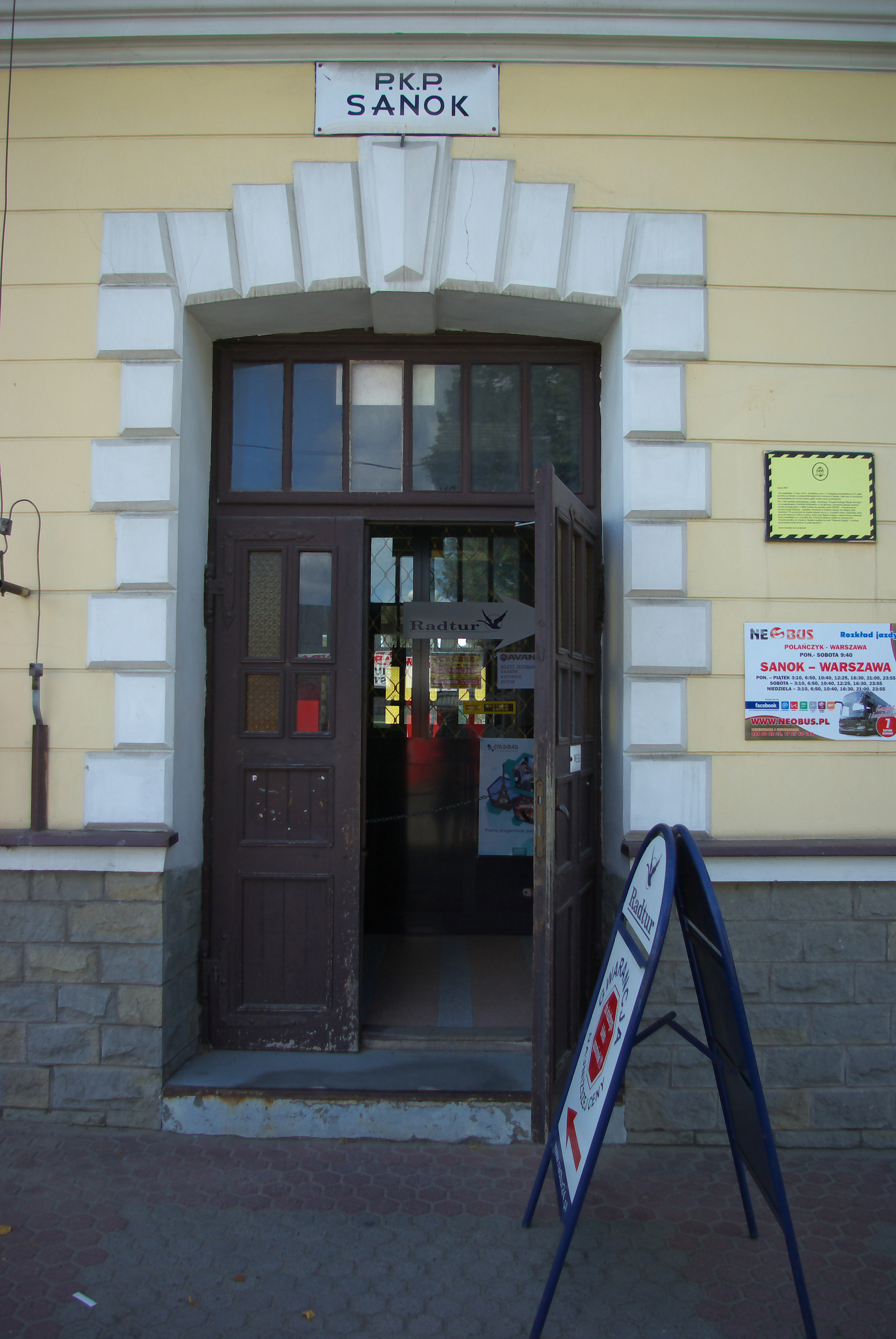
Main entrance doors

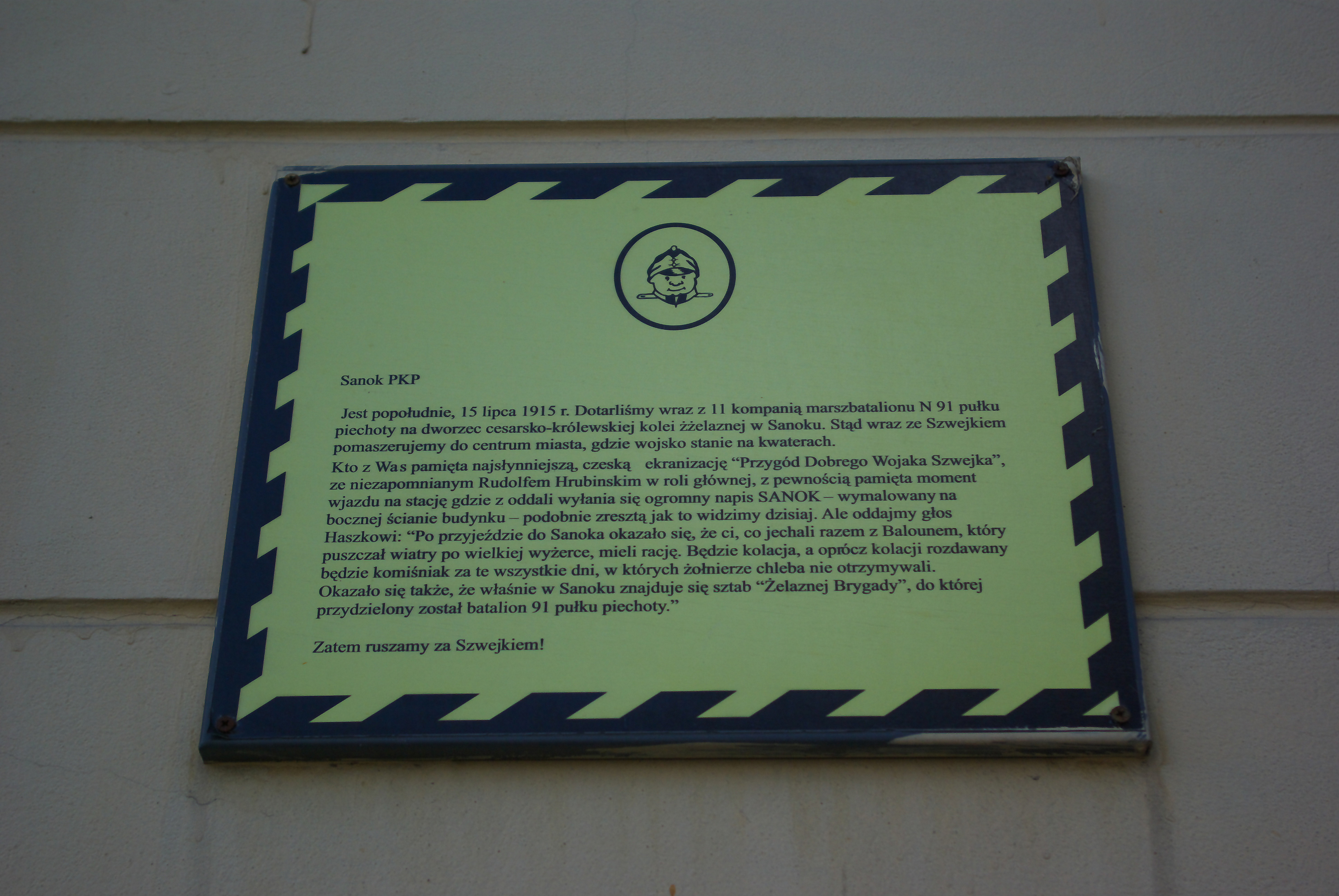
Plaque on the Trail of the Good Soldier Švejk

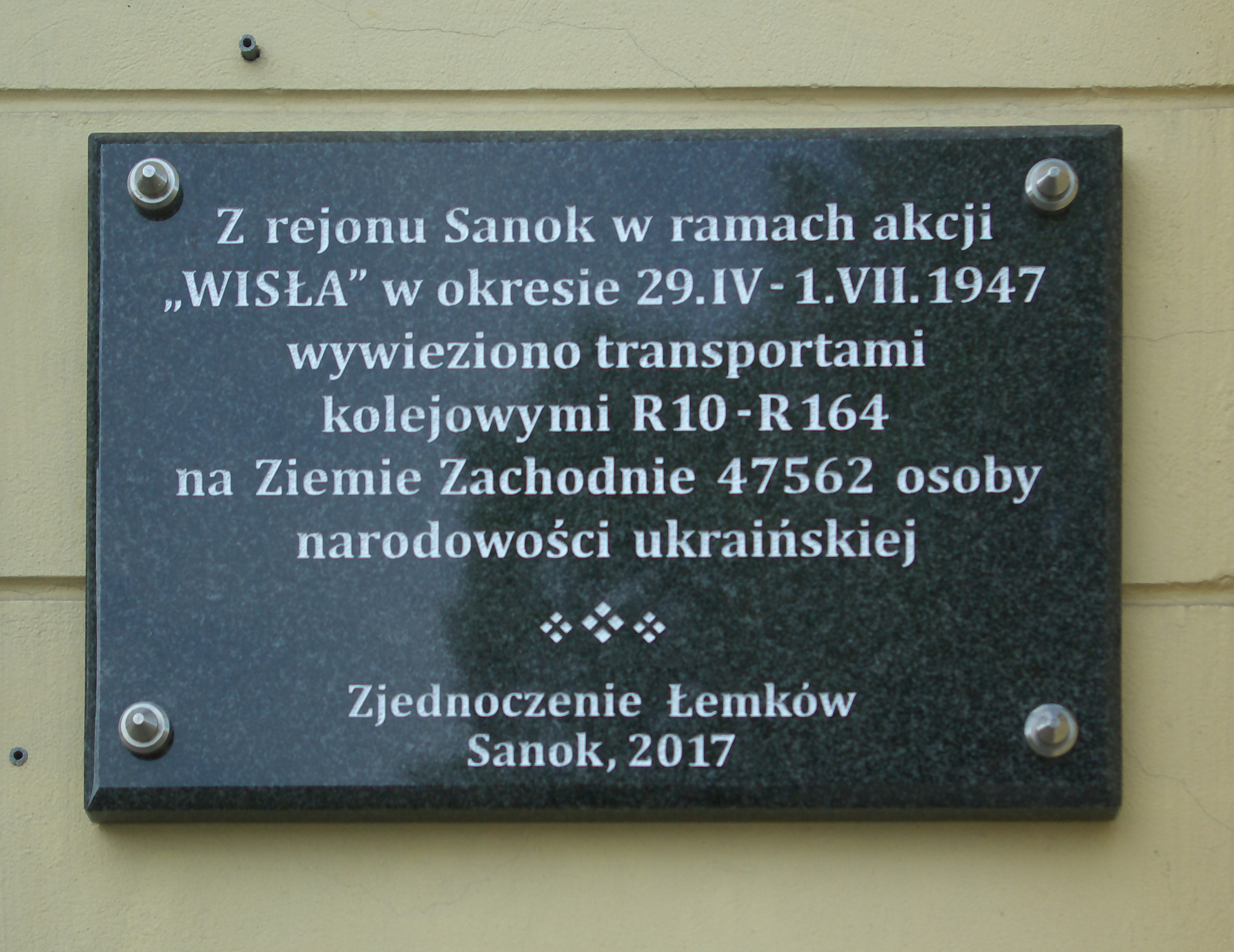
Plaque commemorating victims of Operation Vistula
