= Zaleski Villa =

Historic villa in Sanok, Poland

- Willa Zaleskich (Polish)
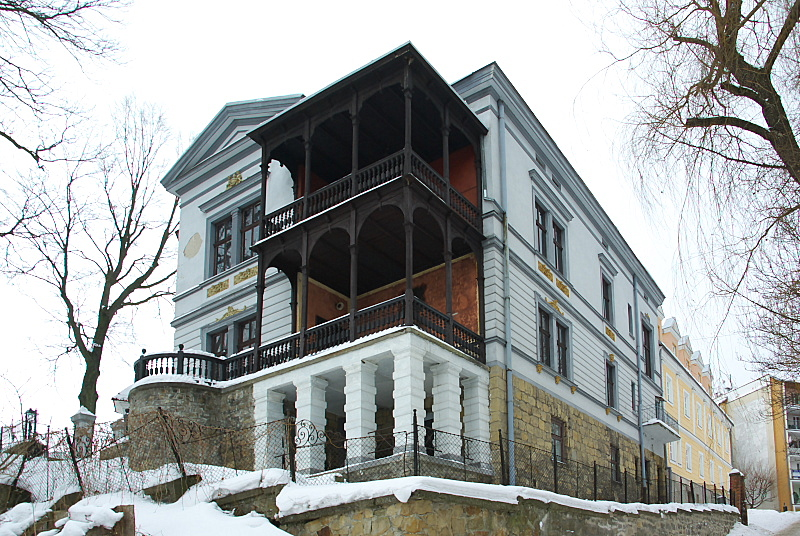
- View of the building from the Castle Stairs
- Interactive map of the Zaleski Villa area

General information
- Type: Tenement
- Location: 1 St. John's Square (Downtown), Sanok, Poland
- Coordinates: 49°33′41″N 22°12′30.5″E
- Construction started: 1896
- Completed: 1910
- Owner: Jerzy Gościński

Design and construction
- Architects: Władysław Beksiński, Wilhelm Szomek

The Zaleski Villa is a historic villa located at 1 St. John's Square in Sanok, Poland.

== Building ==
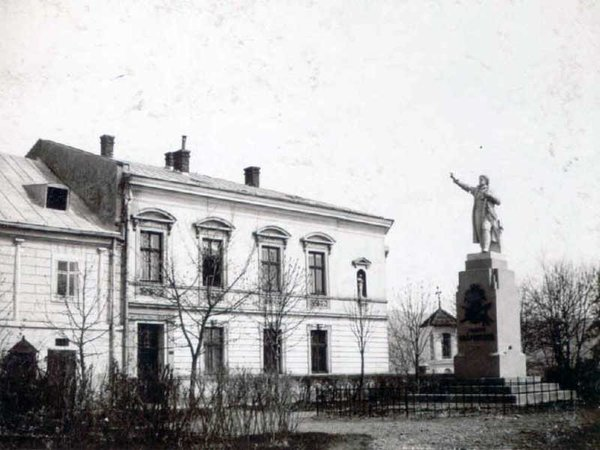
Zaleski Villa and the now-demolished Tadeusz Kościuszko Monument (1933)

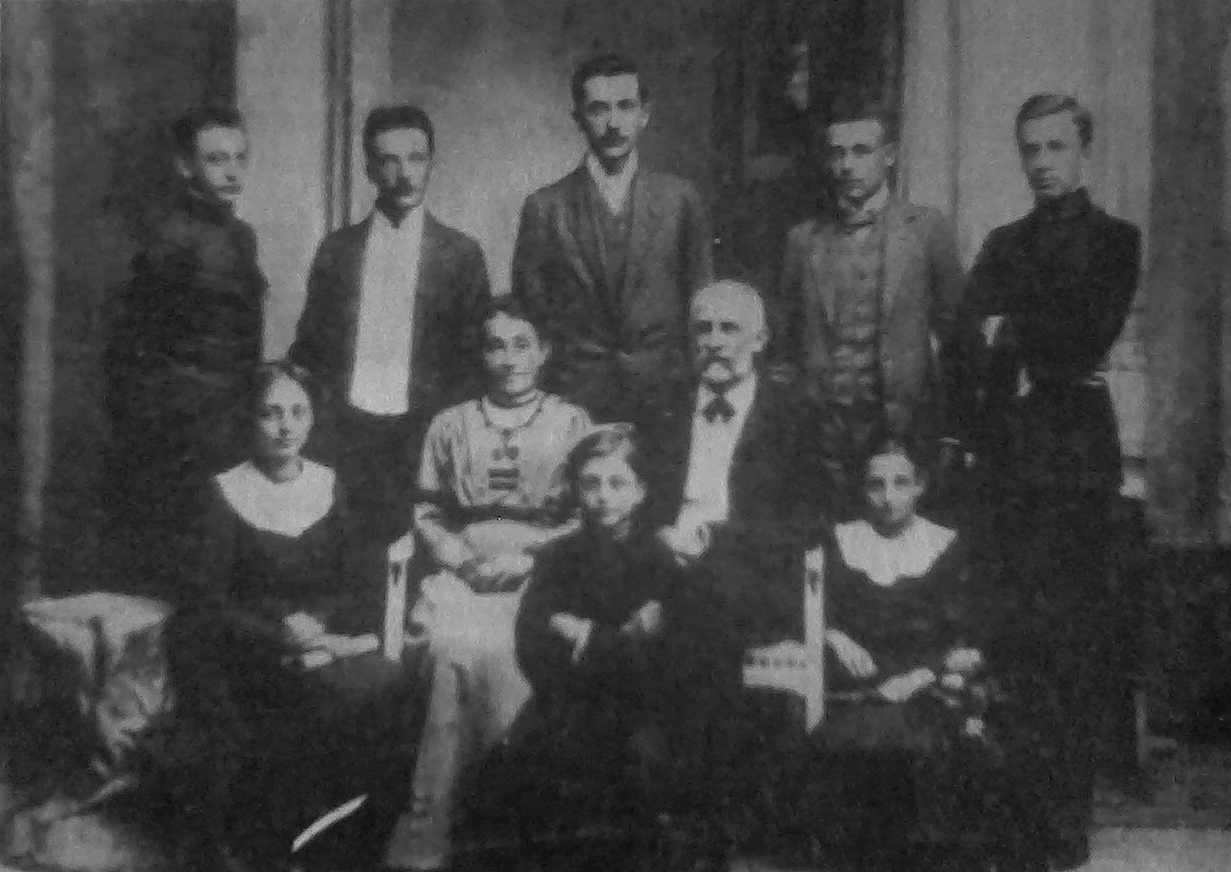
The Zaleski family (c. 1906–1912)

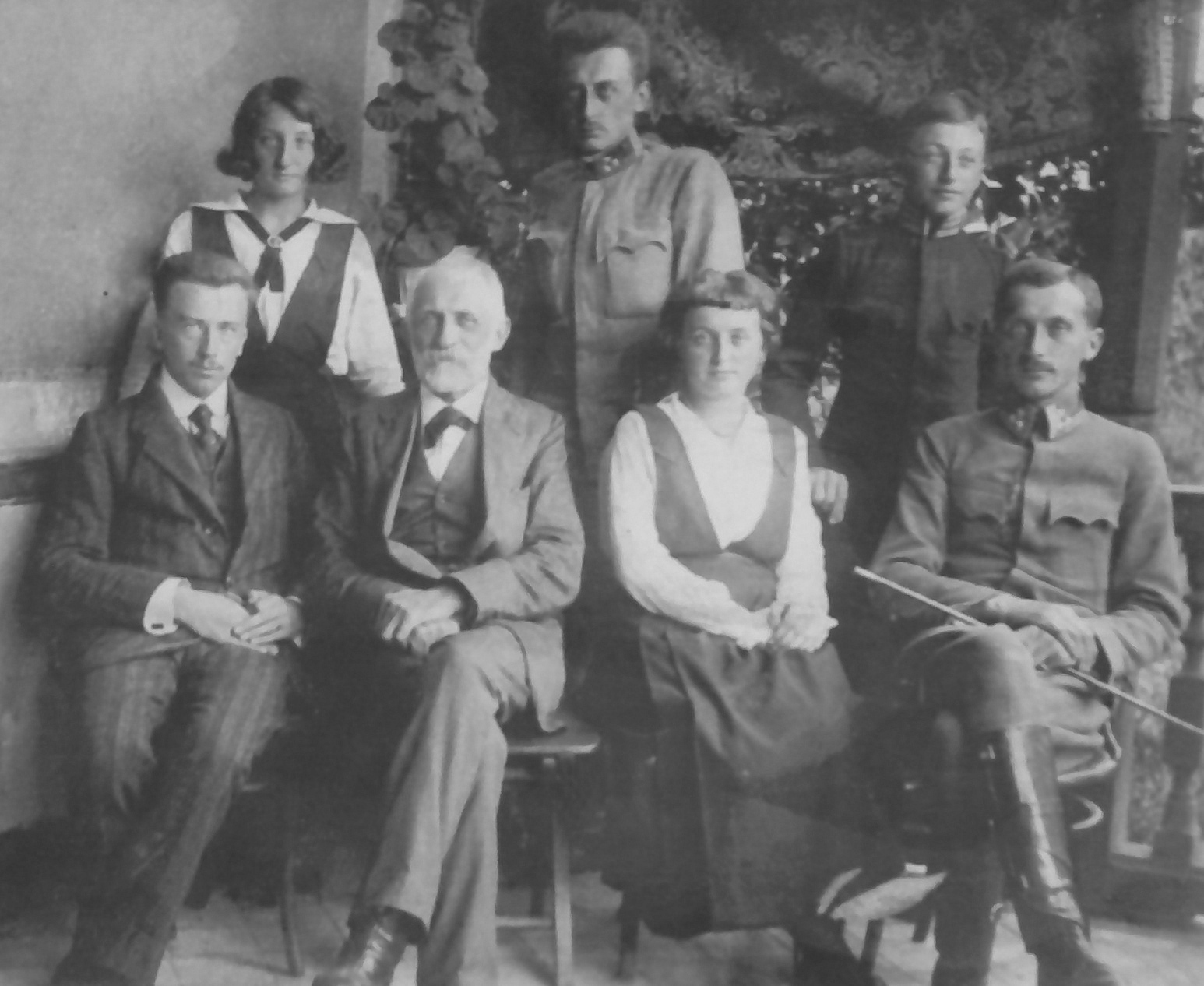
The Zaleski family (c. 1912–1918)

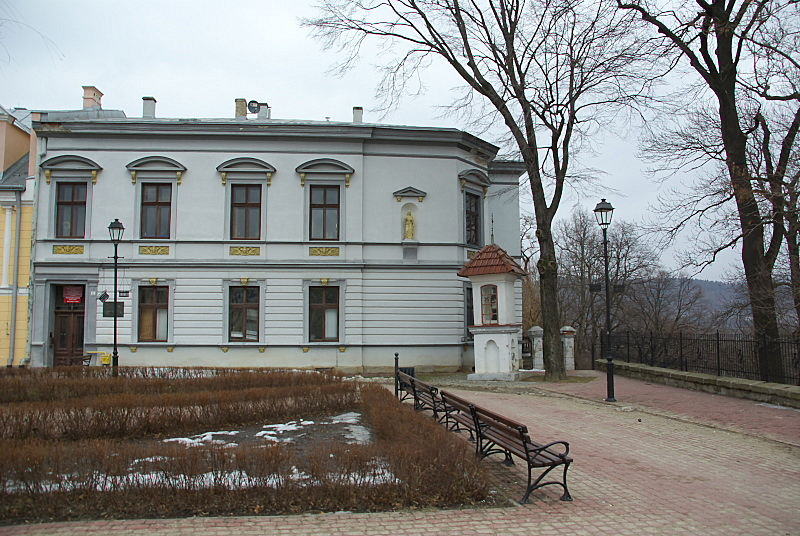
Northern façade of the building, view of St. John's Square

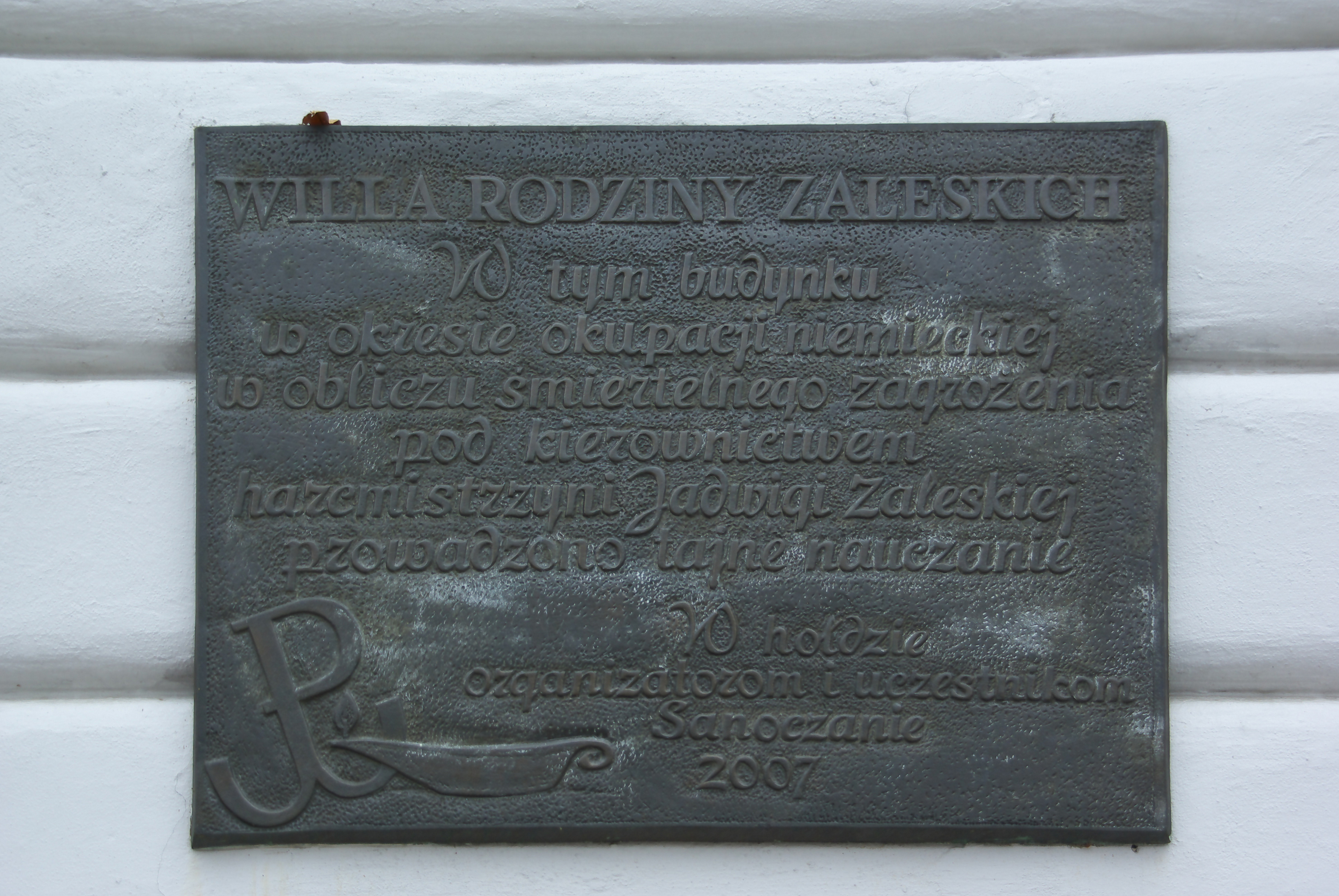
Commemorative plaque on the façade honoring Jadwiga Zaleska's underground education efforts during the German occupation of 1939–1945

The building was designed in 1894 by the city architect, engineer Władysław Beksiński, with Wilhelm Szomek as a co-designer. Construction took place between 1896 and 1910. According to another source, the press reported the consecration of Dr. Karol Zaleski's new home in January 1895. Dr. Karol Zaleski intended the family residence to reflect the architectural style of Venetian palaces. The villa, nicknamed "Falcon's Nest" due to its location above a 40-meter escarpment, features a two-story wooden loggia overlooking the San river and the Słonne Mountains.

Originally, the building was registered under number 4, later changed to 1 St. John's Square. By 1931, ownership had passed to Karol Zaleski's daughter, Maria Hanus.

During World War II and the German occupation, the building was listed under the renamed address 1 St. John's Platz and assigned to Hans Steiniger and Ludwik Świeżawski, a property owner.

The building is co-owned by Jerzy Gościński, a great-grandson of Karol Zaleski, who is a singer, actor, educator, and director, having performed as a soloist with the Silesian Operetta and the Gliwice Musical Theatre. A renovation was undertaken in 1996. The building also hosts the painting gallery of Zdzisław Twardowski.

In 1978, the Monuments Preservation Committee, established by the Sanok branch of the Polish Tourist and Sightseeing Society, placed a plaque on the façade indicating the building's historic status, which later disappeared. The building was listed in the municipal register of Sanok's monuments in 2015.

== Zaleski family ==
The Zaleski family originally hailed from Mykulychyn on the Prut river (now a village in Ukraine). Karol Zaleski (1856–1941) studied at the Jagiellonian University Medical College, graduating in 1884 with a degree in medical sciences. During his studies, he visited Sanok and, standing in St. John's Square, envisioned settling there (at the time, the square featured a St. John of Nepomuk shrine and a small house). He chose Sanok as his place of practice, arriving in 1886 after marrying Wilhelmina Leixer (1859–1912). In his favored location, he built the villa. The couple had nine children (six sons and three daughters): Tadeusz (b. 1887), Juliusz (b. 1889), Karol (b. 1890), Zygmunt (b. 1893), Władysław (b. 1894), Maria (b. 1896), Jakub (b. 1899), Jadwiga (b. 1900), and Zofia Ludwika (1903–1906, died in childhood).

Dr. Karol Zaleski practiced medicine, served as a prison doctor, and was an expert for the District Court. He later became a contract physician for the Austro-Hungarian military unit in Olchowce. During World War I, he worked as a cholera doctor and was the sole physician for the local population. From 1919 to 1939, he served as the city physician. He taught hygiene in schools, promoted healthy lifestyles and sobriety, founding the Eleutria Society for this purpose.

His children also contributed to the city, earning higher education and becoming patriots. Except for Maria, all attended the Queen Sophia Male Gymnasium. Władysław and Zygmunt fought in the Polish-Soviet War. Juliusz, a military officer, historian, and literary critic, co-organized the military in the county in 1918. During World War I, Tadeusz and Karol were exiled to Russia and served in the 5th Rifle Division. Tadeusz, a doctor, died in 1920 in Krasnoyarsk after testing a typhus vaccine on himself. Karol, a scout activist, returned home in 1920 after six years and later became a professor of plant pathology. Władysław (1894–1982) was part of a Polish scout delegation to a jamboree in Birmingham in 1913. In 1918, as a former Austro-Hungarian Army officer and second lieutenant, he led the Youth Emergency Unit, which helped organize the first field military units. He later served as a diplomat and colonel, and in 1974, after the death of General Stanisław Kuniczak, he was appointed president of the Supreme Audit Office in exile for four years. Jadwiga (1900–1993), who studied Polish and Romance philology, specialized in physical education and became a teacher. A member of the Sokół movement, she worked in various institutions and, after the 1939 September Campaign, walked back to Sanok from Toruń. During the German occupation of 1939–1945, as a scoutmaster, she conducted underground education in the villa, leveraging its use as the German Schulamt (school office). In 1941, when the Tadeusz Kościuszko Monument faced demolition by the Germans, she unsuccessfully tried to prevent it, despite earlier assurances to her father, who died on 20 February 1941. The monument was destroyed, and Jadwiga faced reprisals: she was dismissed from her teaching position at the Commercial School and forced to temporarily leave the city, while her young nephew Julian Hanus was deported to Auschwitz concentration camp, where he died. During the war, the villa housed the office of the German school counselor, and confiscated Polish textbooks and books were stored there. In 1940, both Juliusz and Jakub Zaleski became victims of the Katyn massacre. Zygmunt, a lawyer with a doctorate in law, practiced until 1952. Maria Hanus, née Zaleski, graduated from the Baraniecki Institute in Kraków and was active in the Women's League.

Until his death in 1914, Antoni Gołkowski, a January Uprising veteran and professor at the Sanok gymnasium, lived on the first floor with his wife and son.

The Vetulani family also resided in the villa.

== Commemoration ==
On 24 August 1996, during the funeral of Władysław Zaleski in Sanok, a temporary plaque commemorating Karol Zaleski was unveiled at the villa.

Near the villa in St. John's Square stands a late-18th-century St. John of Nepomuk shrine, believed to have been funded in 1810 by Franciszek Ksawery Krasicki as a votive offering for surviving a horseback escape down a steep slope to the San river after the failed defense of Sanok Castle against the Austrians in June 1809. Approximately 5.5 meters tall, it contains a statue of St. John of Nepomuk and was restored in 2004 through the efforts of Jerzy Wielgosz.

== In culture ==
The main character of Bartłomiej Rychter's novel Złoty Wilk (2009) resides in the Zaleski Villa. The story features Dr. Karol Zaleski and Sanok mayors Cyryl Jaksa Ładyżyński and Feliks Giela.
