= St. John's Square, Sanok =

Square in Sanok, Poland

St. John's Square
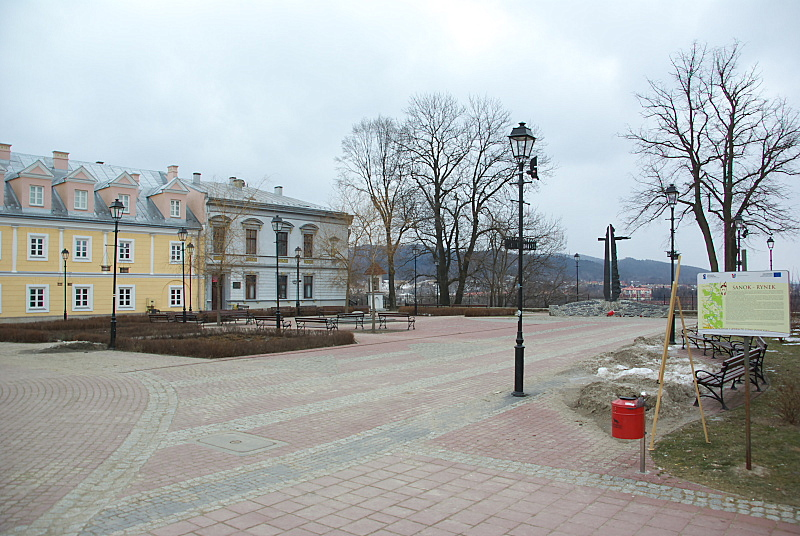
- View from the Market Square. On the left: Inn at 2 Zamkowa Street and Zaleski Villa
- Interactive map of St. John's Square
- Native name: Plac św. Jana (Polish)
- Location: Sanok
- Coordinates: 49°33′40.3″N 22°12′29″E

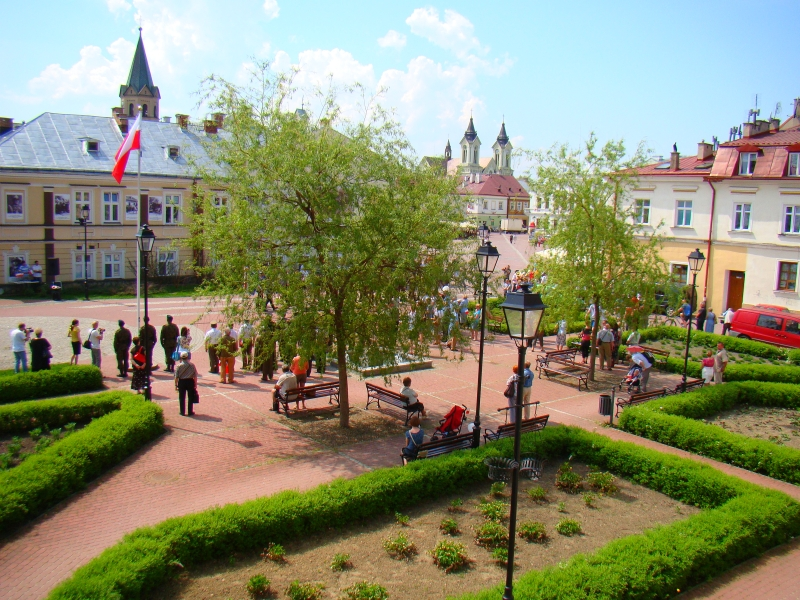
View of the square from the Zaleski Villa

St. John's Square (Polish: Plac św. Jana) is a square-shaped town square in the center of Sanok, Poland.

== History ==
St. John's Square is located in the center of Sanok, in the Downtown district. Originally named "St. John Square", it was developed as a green space in 1892 by the municipal engineer. On 28 September 1902, a Tadeusz Kościuszko Monument, designed by sculptor Julian Markowski, was unveiled in the square. From then on, the square and monument became a gathering place for patriotic youth during national holidays. The monument was destroyed by Nazi occupiers in April 1941. Dr. Karol Zaleski, who lived nearby, noted that the monument was placed "over the cellars of some former new house".

During the German occupation in World War II, the square was renamed to the German-language St. Johann Platz. In 1953, during the Polish People's Republic, the city council renamed it Hanka Sawicka Square. In early 1968, Sanok National Council member Jan Bezucha proposed reverting to the original name, St. John's Square. At the time, a Hanka Sawicka Street already existed in Sanok (since 1951). The proposal was supported by other council members, including Stefan Stefański (then director of the Sanok Historical Museum, who was dismissed from his position as a result) and Mieczysław Przystasz (dismissed from his role as head of the Planning Department in the Sanok County Council Presidium). Jadwiga Zaleska also supported the initiative. According to Father Adam Sudoł, "many people suffered for attempting to restore the original name of St. John's Square". In 1989, the Sanok City Council restored the name St. John's Square.

In the late 1970s, the city commissioned a redesign of the square, but the proposed plan was not implemented. Until the early 21st century, the square was largely covered with greenery and trees. From November 2005 to December 2007, a revitalization project for Market Square and St. John's Square was carried out, following a design competition won by Neoinwest from Kielce in December 2004. The project included reconstruction, renovation of selected facades, modernization of water supply, sanitary and stormwater sewage systems, installation of lighting (lamps and surface lights), removal of trees, addition of benches, and paving with cobblestones. Reconstruction began in January 2007.

Locally, the square has been colloquially referred to as "Pedal Square" or "Pedals' Square".

Sanok-related poet Jan Szelc wrote a poem titled Plac św. Jana in 2003, published in the poetry collection Odmawiam góry.

== Objects in the square ==
- A statue of St. John of Nepomuk from the late 18th century near the Zaleski Villa, believed to have been funded in 1810 by Franciszek Ksawery Krasicki as a votive offering for surviving a horseback escape down a steep slope to the San river after the failed defense of Sanok Castle against the Austrians in June 1809. The statue, approximately 5.5 meters tall, contains a figure of St. John of Nepomuk. It was restored in 2000 by conservator Barbara Bandurka. The statue was renovated by 2002 through the efforts of Jerzy Wielgosz.
- In the past, the square featured a sculpture, Diana with a Fawn, by Roman Tarkowski, which was relocated near the Sanok Castle in the early 21st century.
