= Market Square, Sanok =

Market square in the Downtown district of Sanok, Poland

Market Square
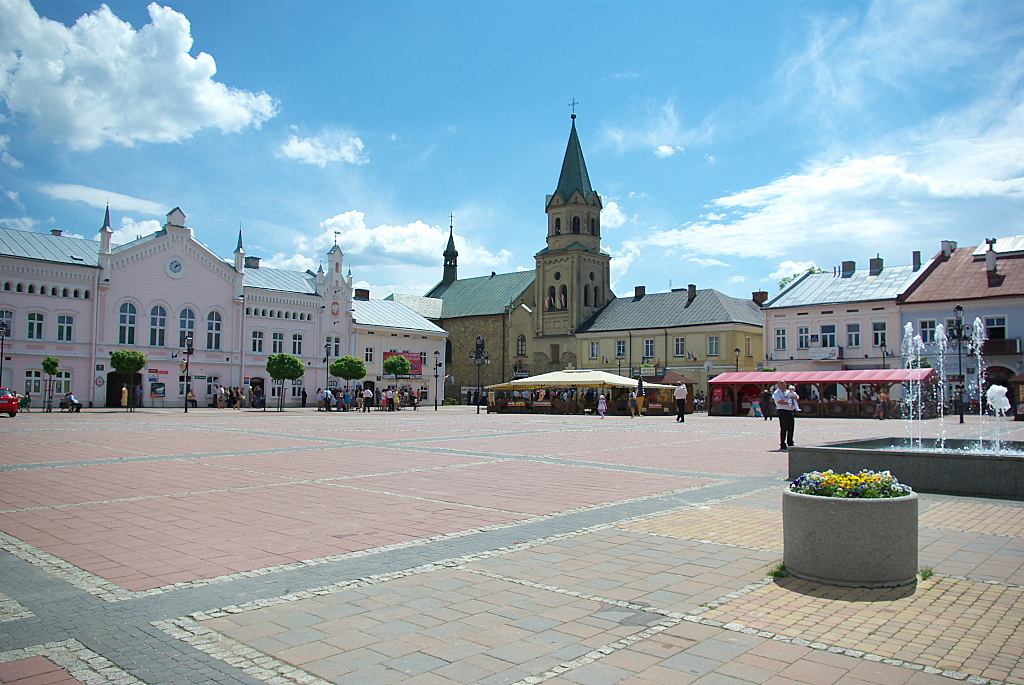
- Market Square in Sanok – view of the eastern and southern frontages, including the old town hall and Franciscan monastery
- Interactive map of Market Square
- Former name(s): Misjonalny Square, Ringplatz, Adolf Hitler Platz, October Revolution Square
- Length: 100 m (330 ft)
- Location: Sanok
- Coordinates: 49°33′40″N 22°12′25″E

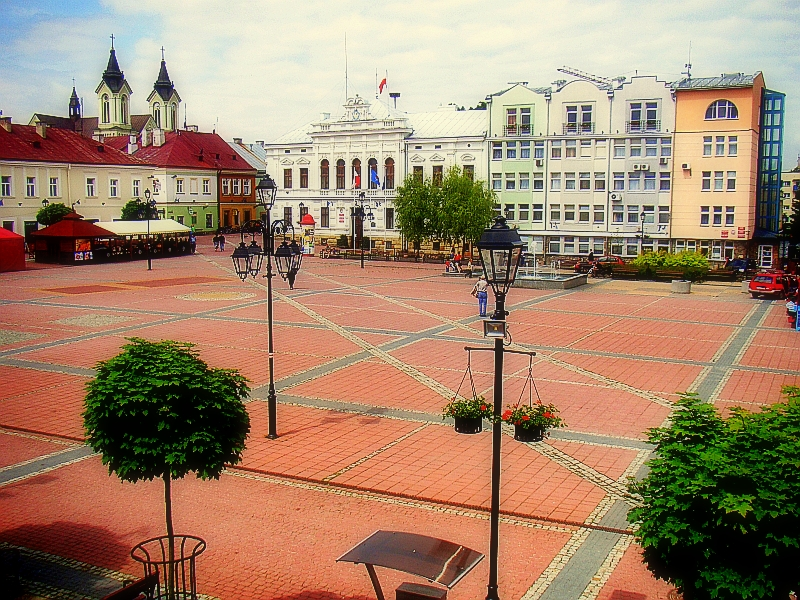
Western part of the Market Square

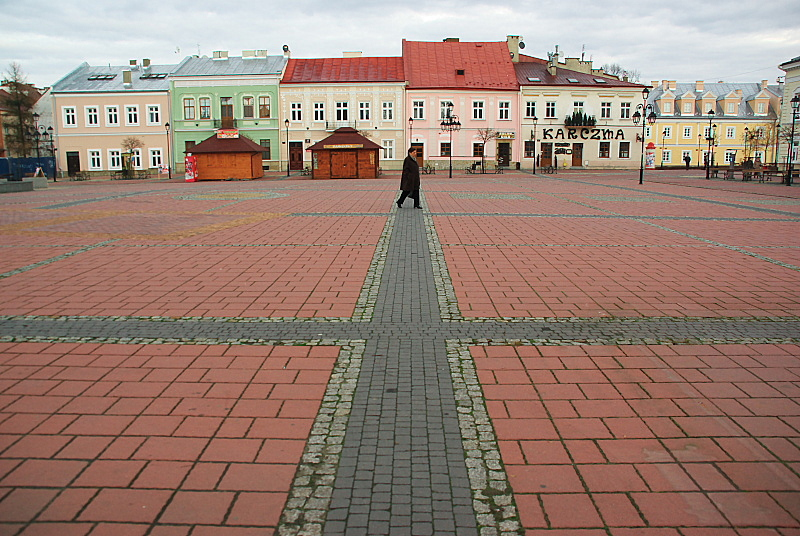
Tenements on the northern frontage of the Market Square

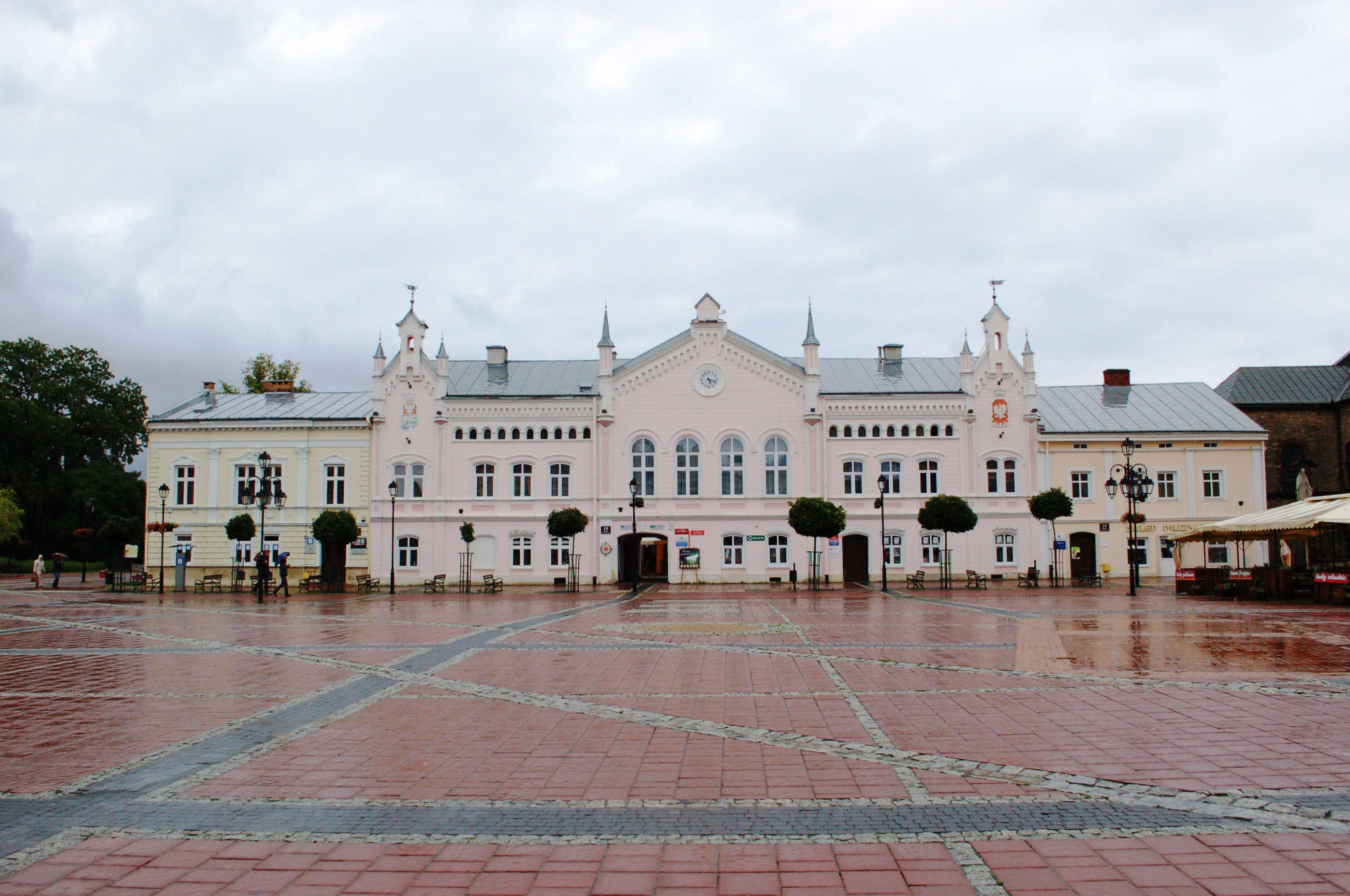
Eastern frontage with the old town hall

Market Square is a square-shaped market square in the downtown district of Sanok.

== History ==
The market square was laid out by Austrian authorities after the city's reconstruction in 1786. The original layout plan for the square dates to the second half of the 14th century, during the city's founding in 1339. The founding charter, issued by Prince Yuri II Boleslav, mandated, among other things, the construction of a town hall and merchant stalls by the wójt. This document was later confirmed by King Casimir III the Great in 1366. The late medieval Sanok market square measured 20 by 20 rods (81 × 81 meters).

For several centuries, the square served economic and military purposes. Weekly markets were held every Wednesday and Friday, along with annual fairs. The tenements surrounding the Sanok market square were built in the late 18th and early 19th centuries. During this period, they housed inns and lodging houses, primarily owned by Jews.

In early 1895, a well was dug in the square to a greater depth (the existing 28 m (92 ft) well was deepened to 52 m (171 ft), placing its base below the level of the San river flowing beneath the Sanok Castle). By July 1895, the well reached 58 m (190 ft) and was planned to be deepened further. The well remained in later years.

In the 19th century, the square was named Misjonalny Square. During World War II, under the German occupation from 1939 to 1944, it was renamed Ringplatz and later Adolf Hitler Platz.

Market Square in 1936

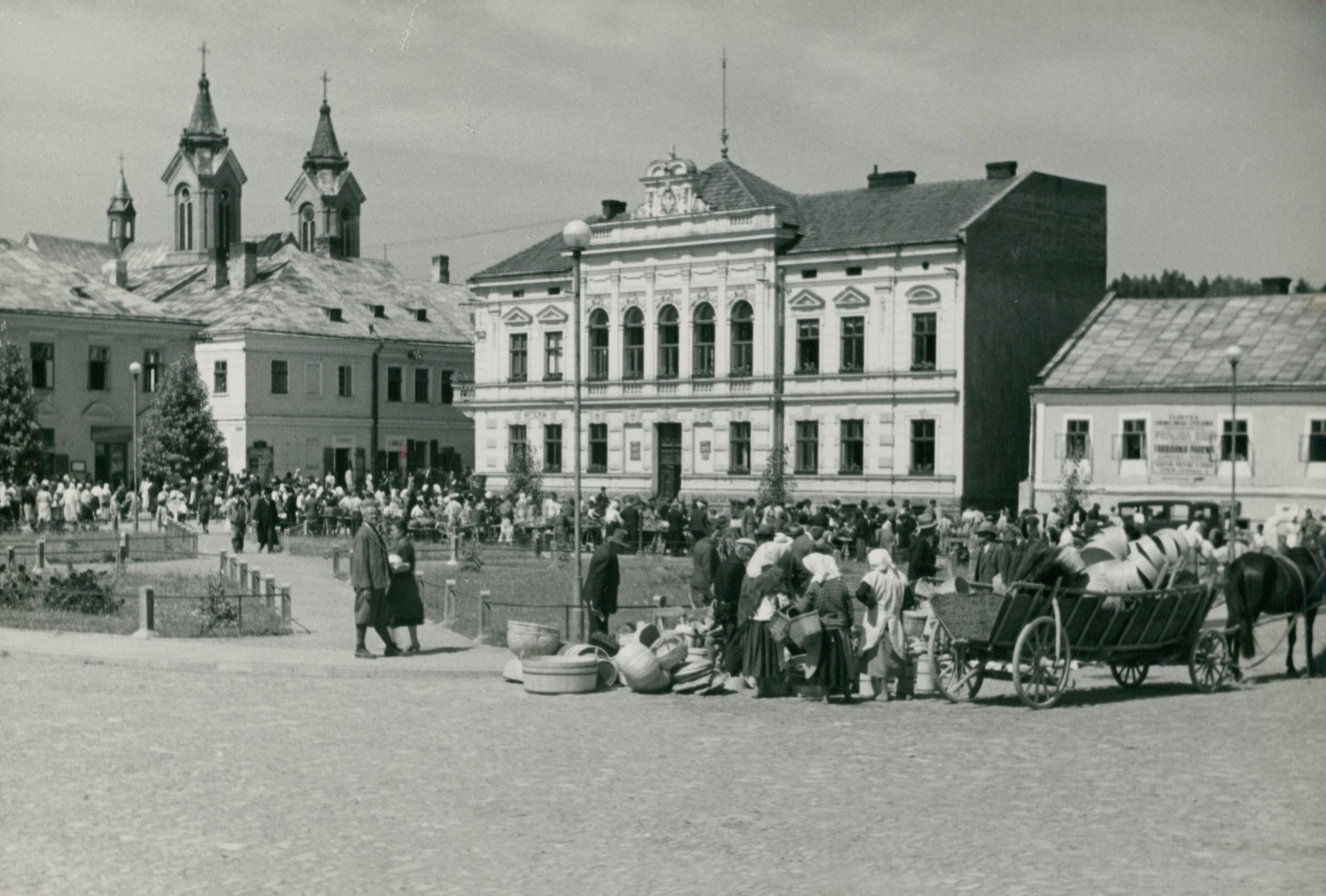

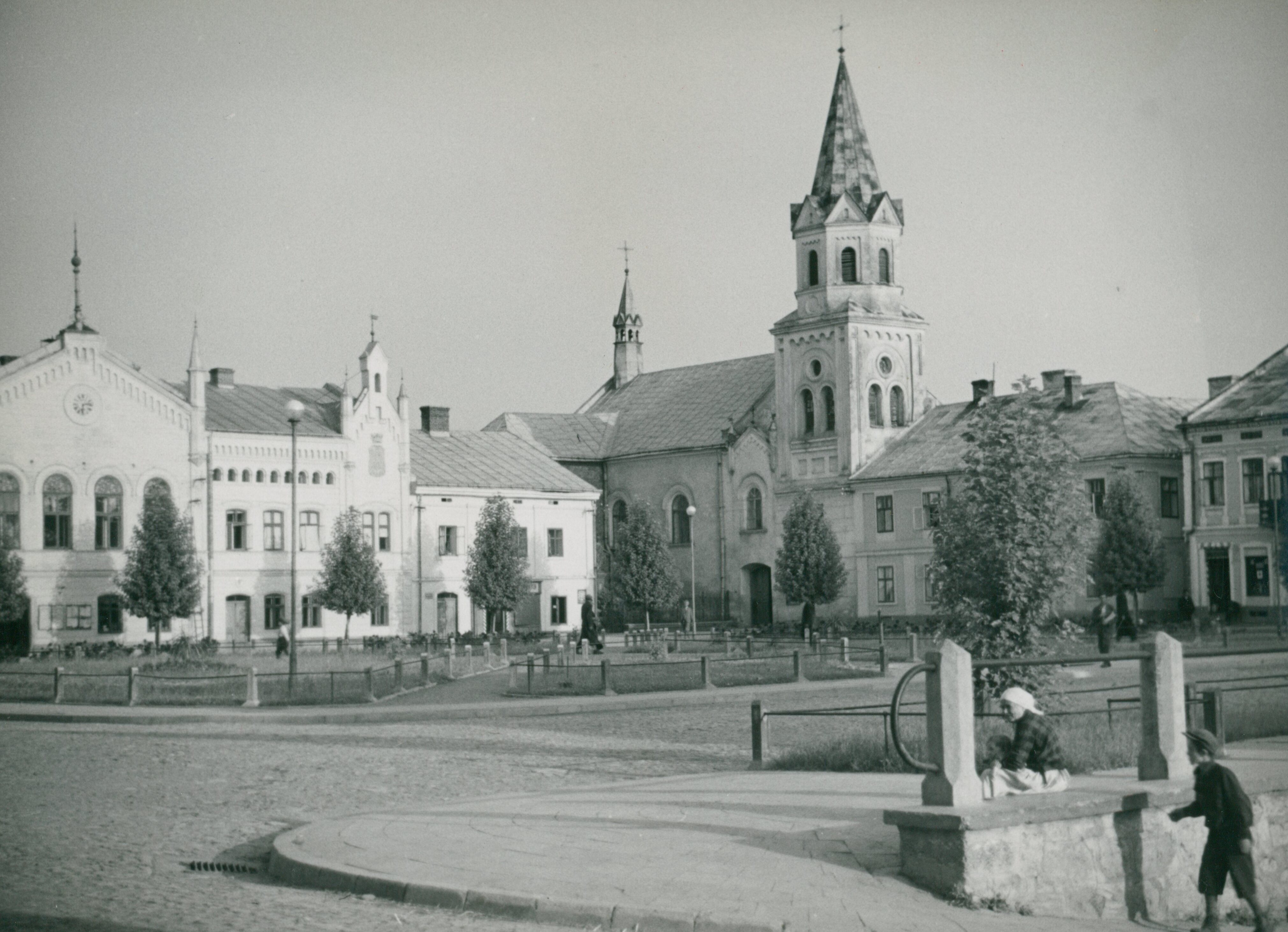

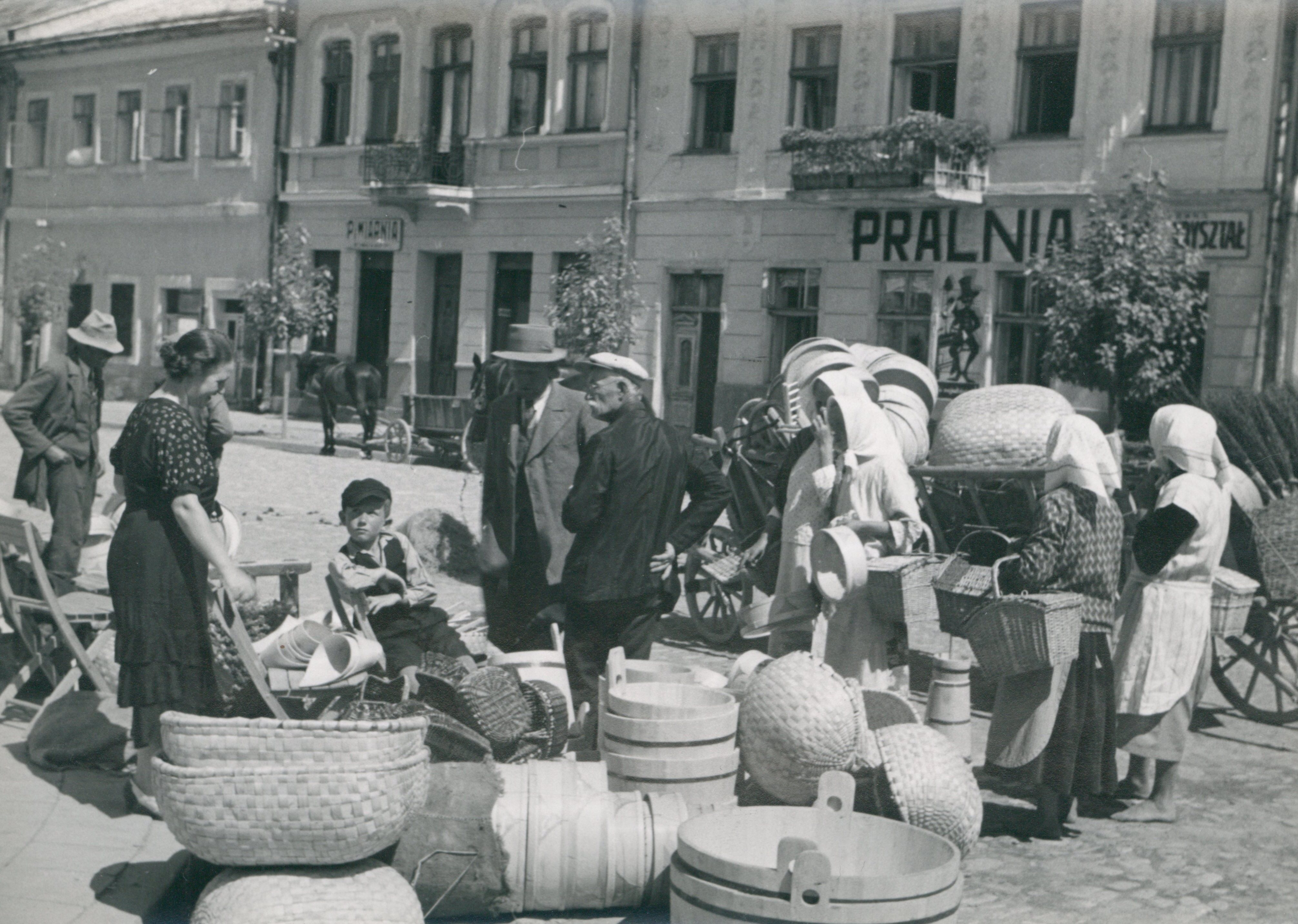

During the Polish People's Republic, the square was named October Revolution Square. A bus station operated on the square until 10 September 1967, when it was relocated to the area in front of the Sanok railway station. Bus stops were moved to Peace Square due to a major renovation of the square. In 1973, a fountain with coloured lighting was installed, built through community effort by the Municipal Enterprise of Communal Services' crew. During the Polish People's Republic, the County Sports, Tourism, and Recreation Center "Wierchy" operated at 24 October Revolution Square until 1989. A multi-meter palm tree was also placed on the square during this period. On 27 April 1986, the market square was the main venue for the Cities Tournament "Sanok – Bolesławiec", which ended with a score of 2:4.

In December 1989, by resolution of the Sanok Municipal Council, October Revolution Square was renamed Market Square.

The square is commonly referred to as the "large market square in Sanok" to distinguish it from the "small market square", St. Michael's Square.

The outline of the former town hall's location was marked on the square's cobblestones after its revitalisation. In December 2004, a competition for the revitalisation project was won by Neoinwest from Kielce.

The eastern frontage features the eclectic town hall at 16 Rynek Street, constructed at the turn of the 19th and 20th centuries after the city purchased houses at numbers 12 (in 1881), 13, and 14 (in 1908) and designed a unified facade by Władysław Beksiński.

Between 1969 and 1971, the square was reconstructed under the initiative of the Presidium of the Municipal Council. Since 1998, the Market Square has been managed by the city of Sanok.

In 1993, a tender initially selected a redevelopment plan for the square that included an amphitheatre, which was not implemented.

Renovation and reconstruction works in central Sanok, including the market square, were planned starting in 2001. From November 2005 to December 2007, the "Revitalization of Market Square and St. John's Square" project was executed, involving reconstruction, renovation of selected facades, modernisation of water supply, sanitary and stormwater drainage systems, installation of lighting (lamps and surface lights), and laying cobblestone paving. The reconstruction began in January 2007.

The market square continues to serve as a venue for military and police parades and oath ceremonies. On 8 December 2007, after years of absence, a military oath ceremony for 210 soldiers of the 21st Podhale Rifles Brigade was held on the square.

== Historic buildings and structures ==
Within the Market Square, including Rynek Street, several buildings are recognised as historic. In 1978, through the efforts of the Monument Preservation Committee at the Sanok branch of the Polish Tourist and Sightseeing Society, a plaque was placed on the facade of a tenement (number 20) indicating the historic nature of the square's buildings.

In 1972, houses at the then-numbered Rynek Street addresses 8, 9, 10, 11, 12, 15, 17, 20, 22, and 23, consisting of tenements, were added to the updated Sanok monument register. The municipal register of Sanok monuments, published in 2015, includes buildings at 1, 5, 7, 9, 10 (tenement), 10 (synagogue), 11, 12, 14, 16, 18, 20, 21, 22, and 23 Rynek Street. The register of monuments maintained by the Voivodeship Conservators includes, among others:

- Tenement at 7 Rynek Street. During the Polish People's Republic, a PKS ticket office operated at number 7, and from 1972, the tenement, managed by the municipal authority, housed the Sanok branch of the Society of Fighters for Freedom and Democracy. An adjacent room housed a workshop of the Spójnia Invalids' Cooperative. The tenement currently houses the Sanok City Guard.
- Tenement at 11 Rynek Street. From 1978 to 1986, Leon Chrapko operated an art gallery there.
- Tenement at 12 Rynek Street. Until 1916, Dr. Maurycy Drewiński lived on the upper floor and operated a medical practice on the ground floor. Later, a photography studio was located there. The building now houses the Karczma. Jadło Karpackie restaurant.
- Building at 15 Rynek Street, located behind the town hall, houses the Regional Chamber of Commerce. Since September 2000, a space provided by the Entrepreneurship Initiative Association has housed the Sanok Land Archive.
- Tenement at 20 Rynek Street. It initially housed the Sanok Municipal Private Women's Teacher Training Seminary, established in 1923. The building hosts a café, a children's community center (dedicated by Bishop Stefan Moskwa on 20 October 1996), the NZOZ Rehabilitation Center for Children and Youth with Disabilities (since 1999), and a bookstore associated with the adjacent Franciscan church. On 4 June 2014, a plaque was unveiled on the tenement's facade commemorating three NSZ soldiers executed in Sanok on 24 May and 4 June 1946: Władysław Kudlik}, Władysław Skwar, and Henryk Książek.
- Tenement at 22 Rynek Street. It previously housed the Jewish Konsum store. The building features a gate, likely one of the oldest in the Market Square area.

Before 1914, a shoemaking workshop and store operated at 15 Rynek Street. During the Polish People's Republic, the No. 1 Legal Team in Sanok, part of the Rzeszów Bar Association, operated at 12 October Revolution Square.

The municipal register of monuments also includes buildings at 1, 5, 7, 9, 10, 11, and 12 Rynek Street.

== Monuments and commemorations ==
- In front of the tenement at 14 Rynek Street, two benches with plaques commemorate Sanok-born writers:
  - A bench with a plaque commemorating Kalman Segal (1917–1980), unveiled in October 2007.
  - A bench with a plaque commemorating Janusz Szuber (1947–2020), who lived in the tenement, established in late 2020.
- In front of the tenement at 14 Rynek Street, a monument commemorates Sanok-born artist Zdzisław Beksiński (1929–2005). The sculpture, created by Adam Przybysz, was unveiled on 19 May 2012.
- On 29 December 2023, a statuette of Grześ of Sanok was unveiled on a stone in the square.

== Events ==
- In spring 1946, Sanok was the site of public executions of NSZ soldiers. On 4 June 1946, Warrant Officer Henryk Książek was hanged in the south-western frontage of the Market Square. On 24 May 1946, Władysław Kudlik and Władysław Skwarc, partisans from Żubryd's unit, were executed at the city stadium.

== In culture ==
- Adjacent to the town hall and Franciscan church stands a Jewish tenement that once housed a branch of the Vienna Bank. It served as the headquarters of the Iron Brigade, which included the 91st Infantry Regiment from České Budějovice, where Josef Švejk was stationed during his time in Sanok.
