= Toruń =

City in Kuyavian-Pomeranian, Poland

- City county
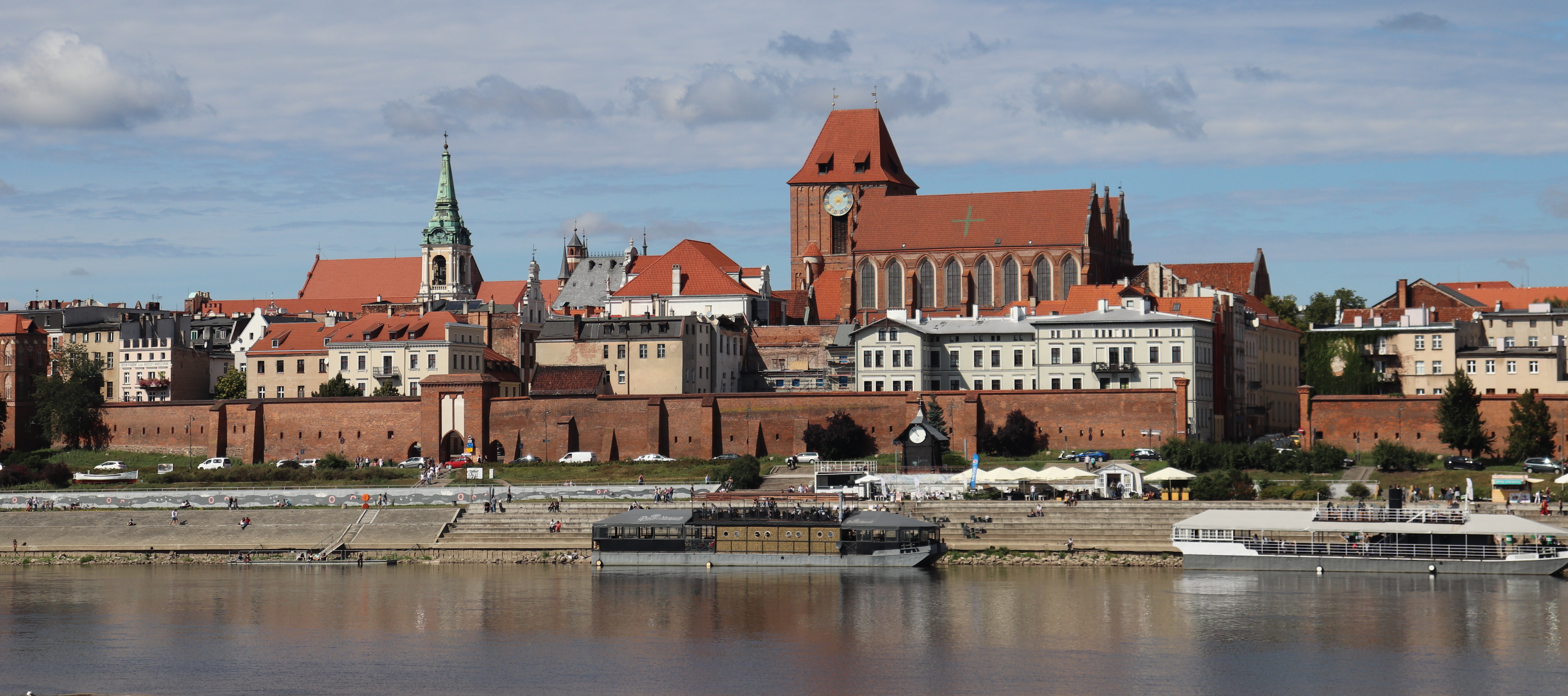
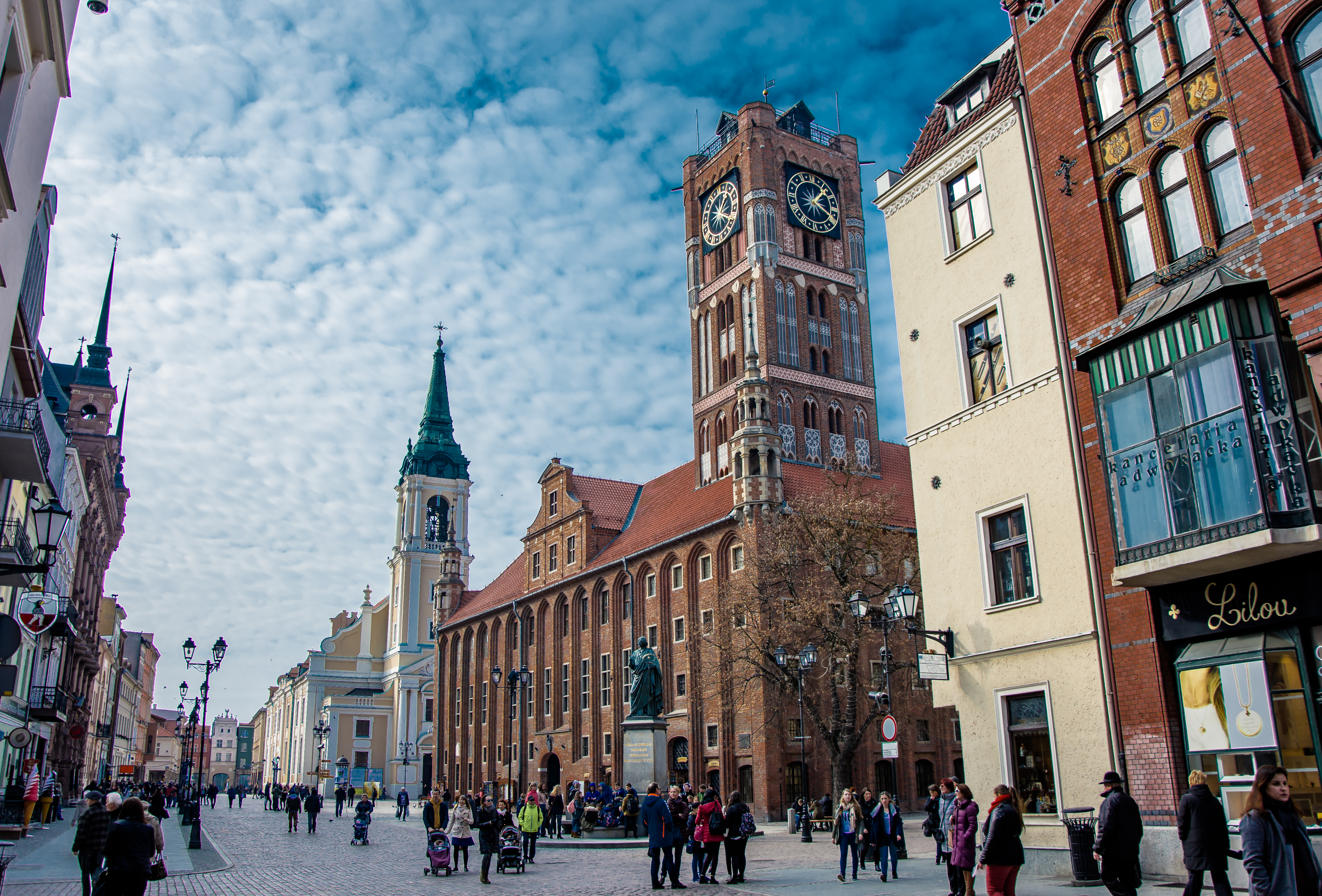
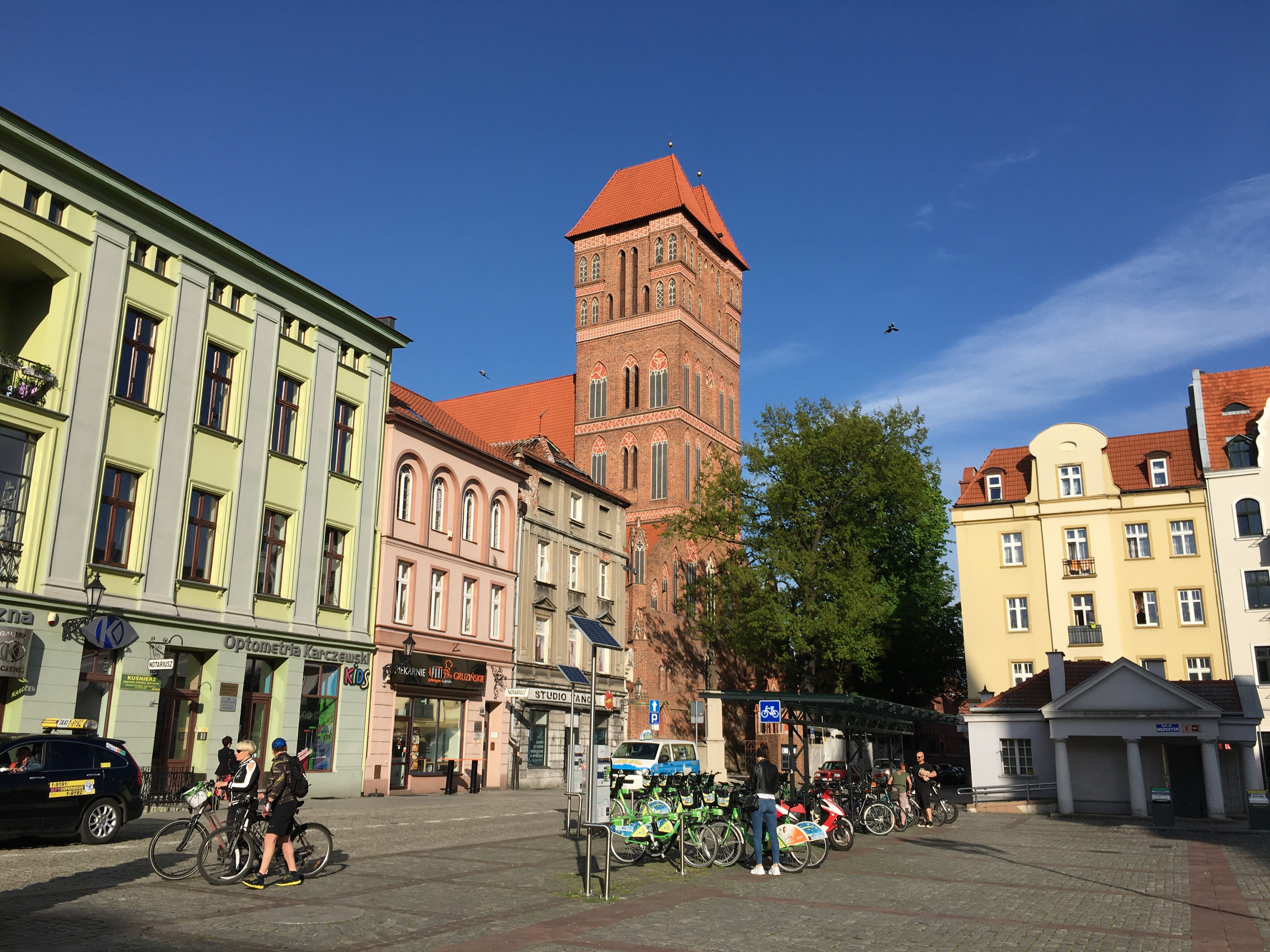
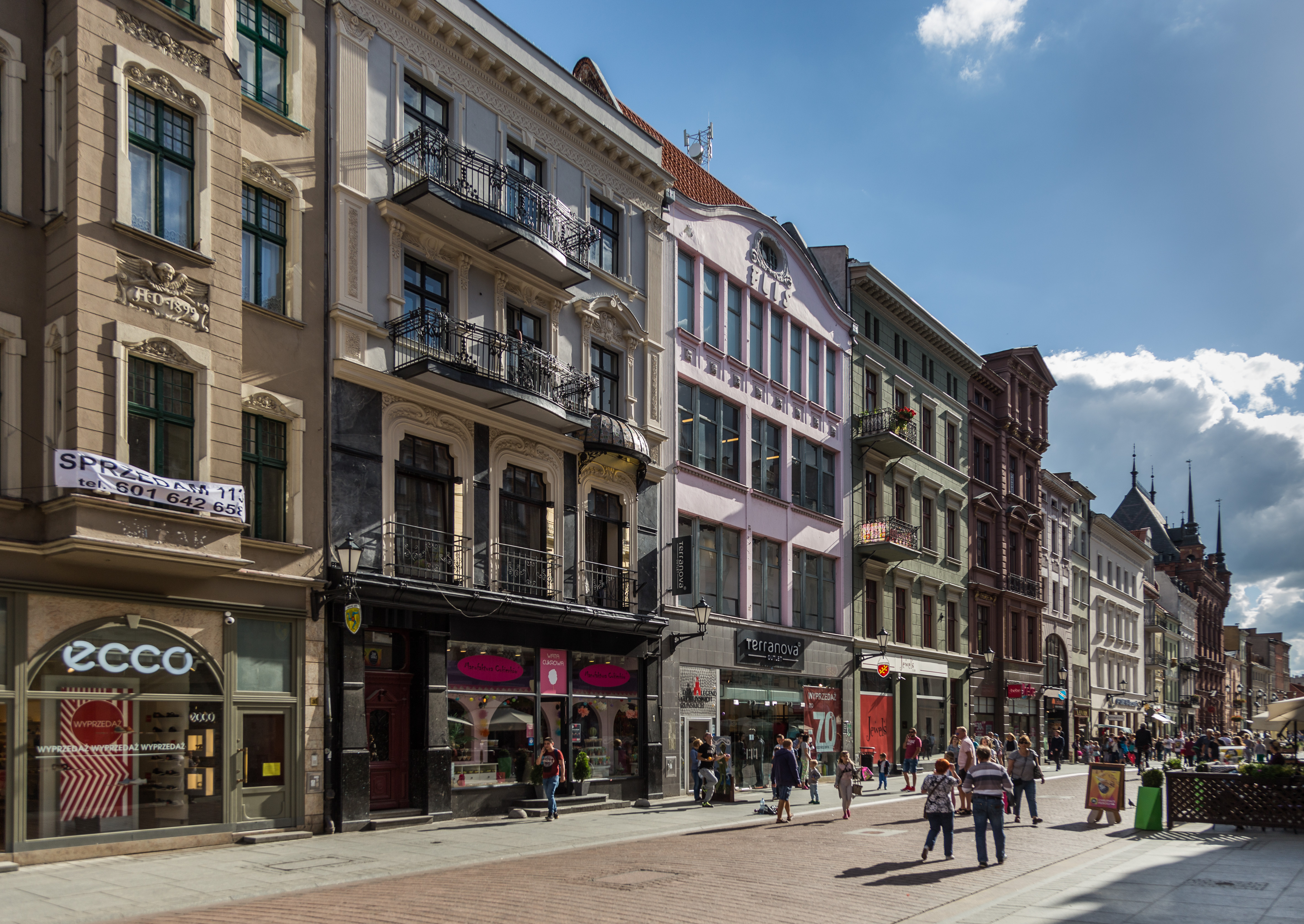
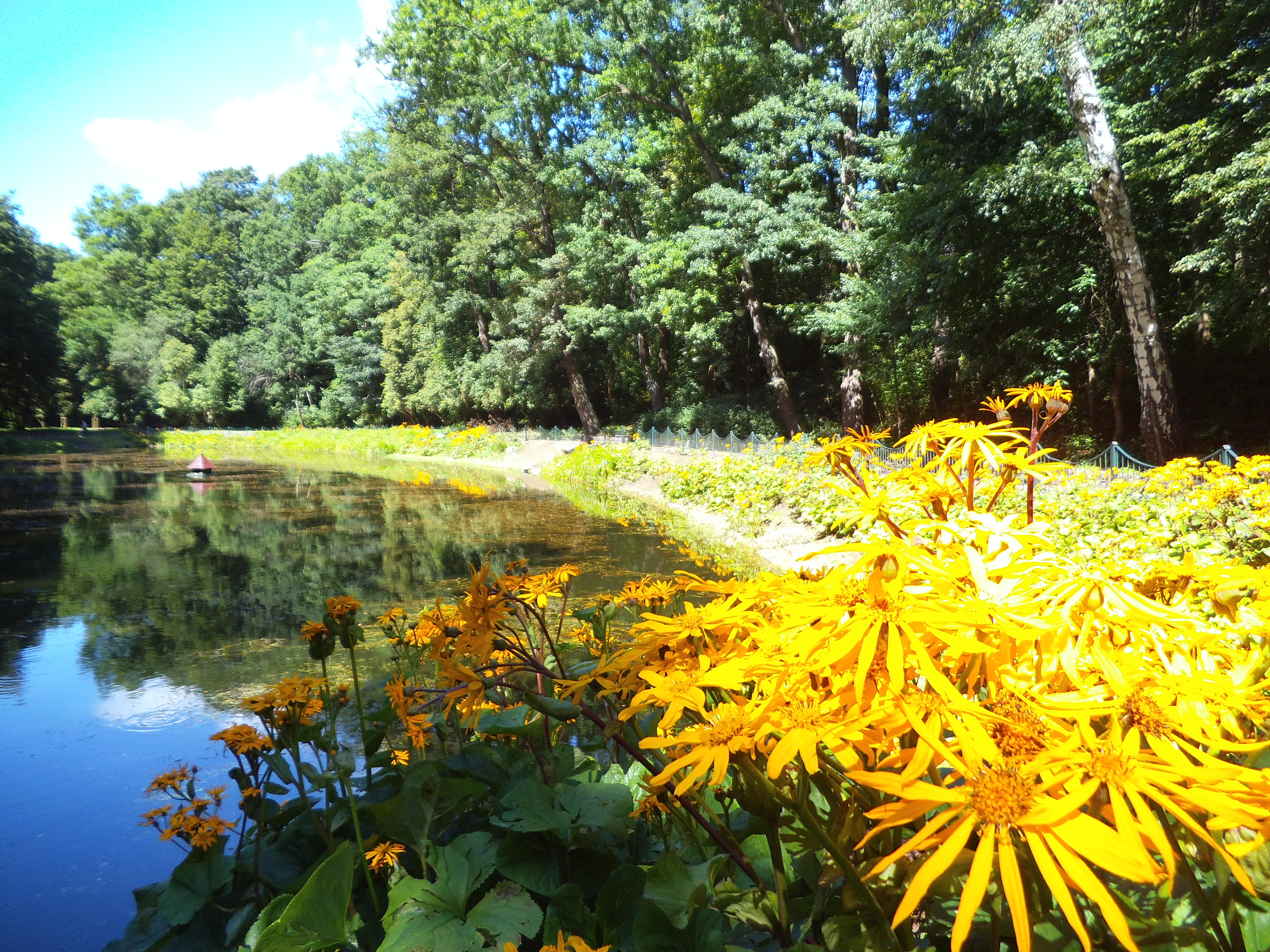
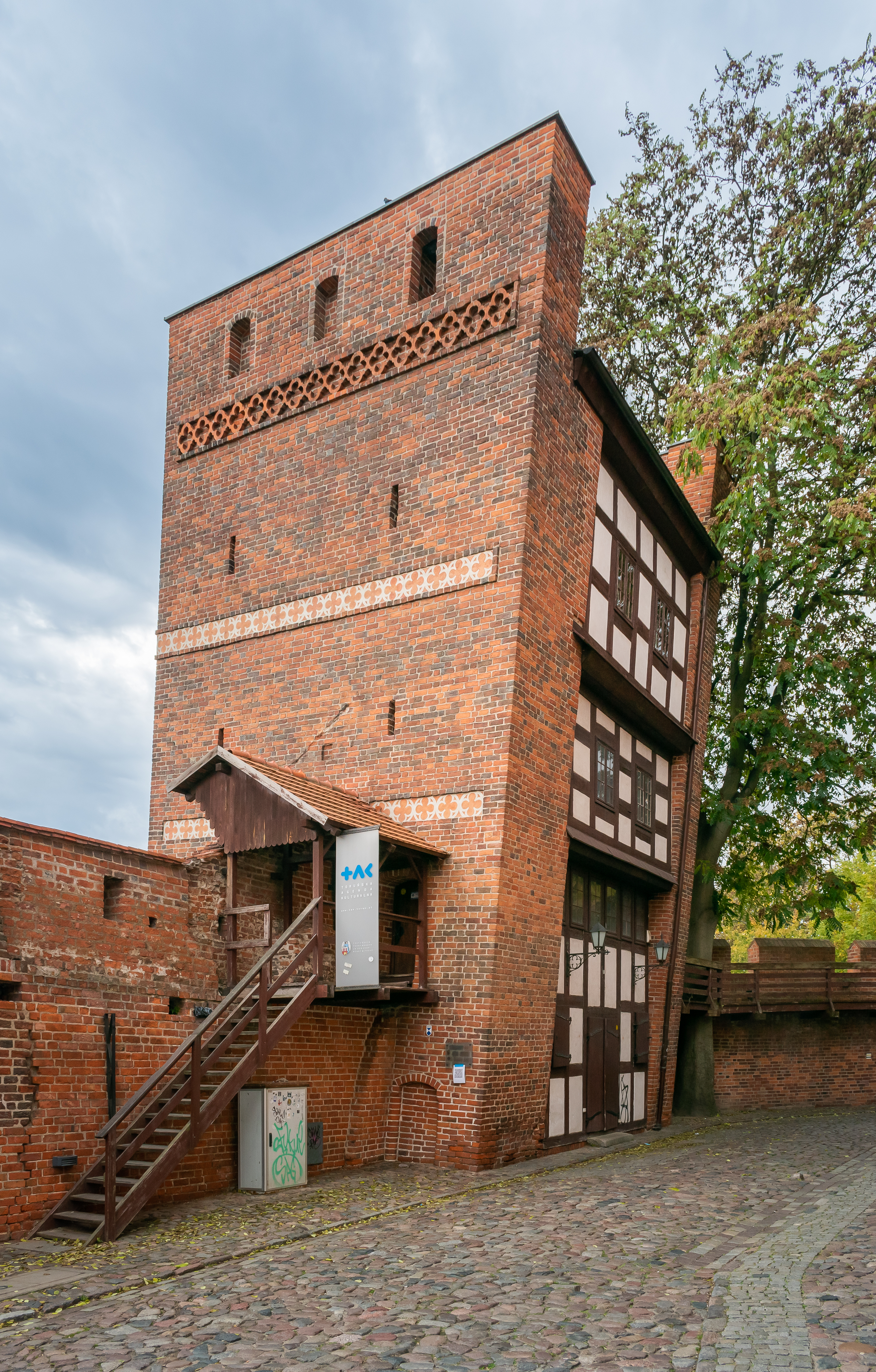
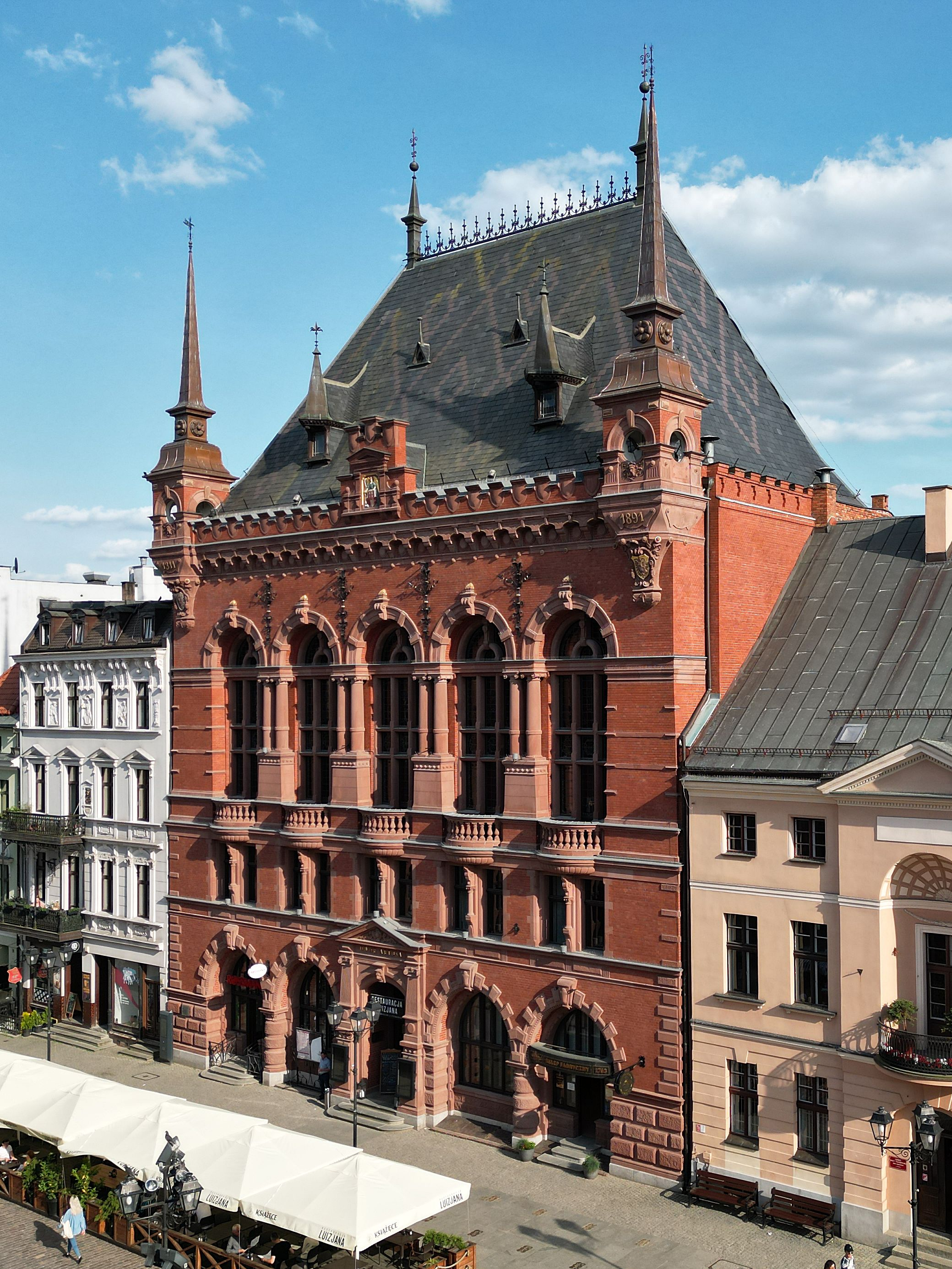
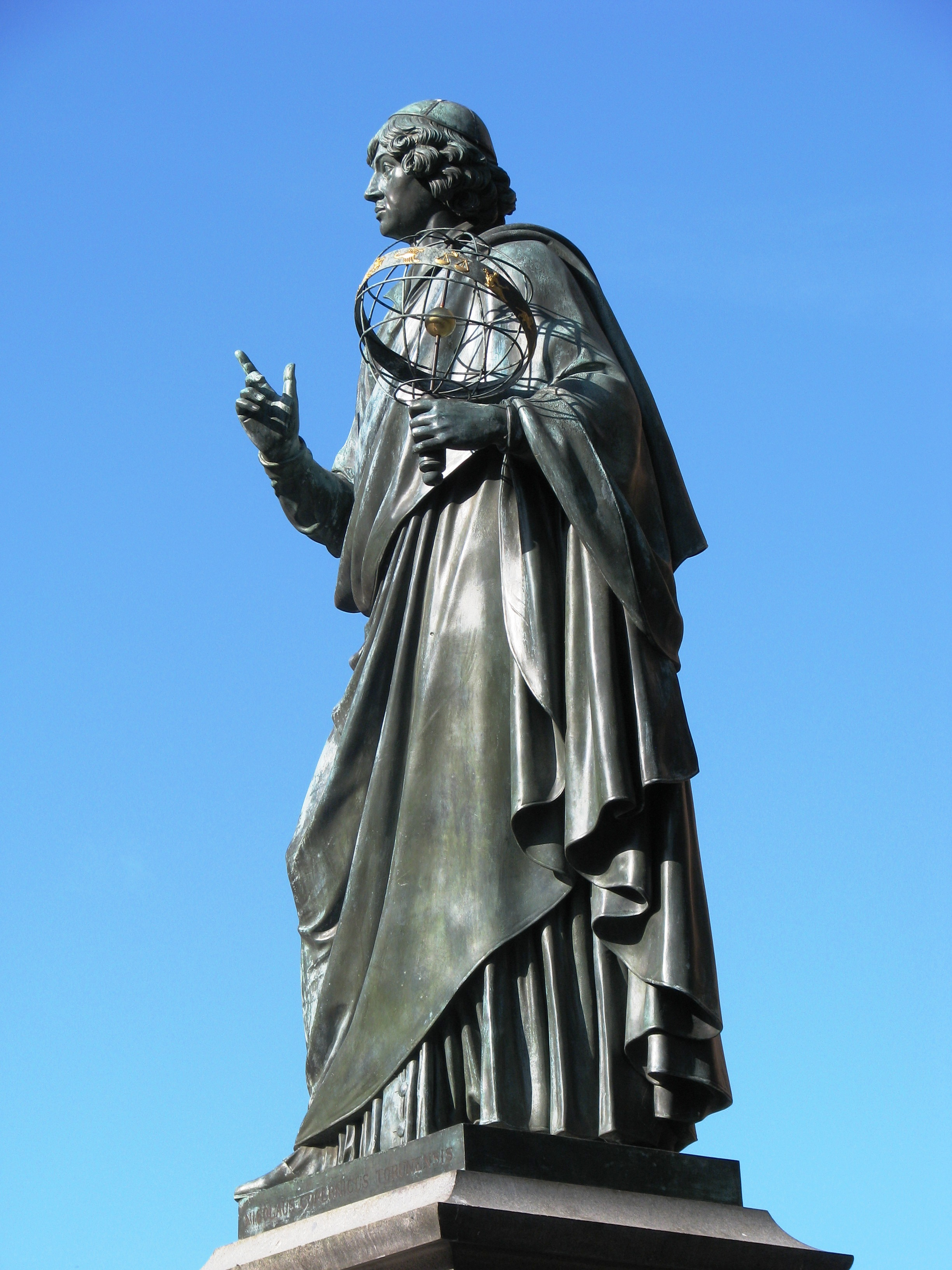
- Old Town seen from the Vistula Old Town Market Square New Town Square Szeroka Street Municipal Park Leaning Tower Artus Court Copernicus Monument

- Flag Coat of arms
- Nicknames: City of Angels, Gingerbread city, Copernicus Town
- Motto: "Durabo" (Latin: "I will endure")
- Location within Poland
- Coordinates: 53°01′20″N 18°36′40″E
- Country: Poland
- Voivodeship: Kuyavian-Pomeranian
- Established: 8th century
- City rights: 1233

Government
  - City mayor: Paweł Gulewski (KO)

Area
  - City county: 115.75 km^{2} (44.69 sq mi)
- Elevation: 65 m (213 ft)

Population (31 December 2021)
  - City county: 196,935 ▼ (16th)
  - Density: 1,716/km^{2} (4,440/sq mi)
  - Metro: 297,646
- Demonym(s): torunianin (male) torunianka (female) (pl)

GDP
  - Bydgoszcz–Toruń metropolitan area: €10.871 billion (2020)
- Time zone: UTC+1 (CET)
  - Summer (DST): UTC+2 (CEST)
- Postal code: 87-100 to 87-120
- Area code: +48 56
- Car plates: CT
- Website: http://www.torun.pl/

UNESCO World Heritage Site
- Official name: Medieval Town of Toruń
- Type: Cultural
- Criteria: ii, iv
- Designated: 1997
- Reference no.: 835
- UNESCO region: Europe

Historic Monument of Poland
- Official name: Toruń – Old and New Town
- Designated: 1994-09-08
- Reference no.: M.P., 1994, vol. 50, No. 422

Toruń (Polish: [ˈtɔruɲ]; (Note: Anglicized as: UK: /ˈtɒrʊnjə/; US: /ˈtɔːruːn(jə), ˈtoʊruːn/) German: Thorn [ˈtoːɐ̯n]) is a city on the Vistula River in north-central Poland and a UNESCO World Heritage Site. Its population was 196,935 as of December 2021. Previously, it was the capital of the Toruń Voivodeship (1975–1998) and the Pomeranian Voivodeship (1921–1945). Since 1999, Toruń has been a seat of the local government of the Kuyavian–Pomeranian Voivodeship and is one of its two capitals, together with Bydgoszcz. The cities and neighboring counties form the Bydgoszcz–Toruń twin city metropolitan area.

Toruń is one of the oldest cities in Poland; it was first settled in the 8th century and in 1233 was expanded by the Teutonic Knights. For centuries it was home to people of diverse backgrounds and religions. From 1264 until 1411, Toruń was part of the Hanseatic League and by the 17th century a leading trading point, which greatly affected the city's architecture, ranging from Brick Gothic to Mannerist and Baroque.

In the Early Modern period, Toruń was a royal city of Poland and one of Poland's four largest cities. With the partitions of Poland in the late 18th century, it became part of Prussia, then of the short-lived Duchy of Warsaw, serving as the temporary Polish capital in 1809, then again of Prussia, of the German Empire and, after World War I, of the reborn Polish Republic. During the Second World War, Toruń was spared bombing and destruction; its Old Town and iconic central marketplace have been entirely preserved.

Toruń is renowned for its gingerbread – the gingerbread-baking tradition dates back nearly a millennium – as well as for its large Cathedral. It hosts the Camerimage International Film Festival of the Art of Cinematography. Toruń is noted for its very high standard of living and quality of life. In 1997 the medieval part of the city was designated a UNESCO World Heritage Site. In 2007 the Old Town of Toruń was added to the list of Seven Wonders of Poland.

== Toponymy ==
The exact origin of the city's name is unknown. According to the findings of some linguists and historians, it is derived from the Old Slavic word "tor" (meaning "a beaten path"). The name "Toruń" would mean a roadside settlement.

The settlement was first mentioned in 1226 under the name Thorun. In later documents, it also appeared as Turon, Turun, and Thoron. From the 15th century onward, the monosyllabic form Thorn came into use.

The city's Latin name may be given as either Thorunium or Thorunum.

== History ==
=== Middle Ages ===
The first settlement in the vicinity of Toruń is dated by archaeologists to 1100 BC (Lusatian culture). From the 5th century BCE to the 8th century CE, there are few archaeological traces in the vicinity of Toruń. For the Roman period, two settlements and a cemetery have been discovered. In the later period, traces of a river crossing are visible near the village of Stary Toruń.

During early medieval times, in the 7th through 13th centuries, it was the location of an old Slavonic settlement, at a ford of the river Vistula, located on the site where the later Teutonic Castle was built. In the 10th century it became part of the emerging Polish state ruled by the Piast dynasty. The settlement was expanded and transformed into a fortified stronghold. This stronghold was destroyed at the turn of the 12th and 13th centuries, most likely as a result of a Prussian raid.

At that time, this area formed part of the Chełmno Land, a region within the Duchy of Masovia ruled by Konrad I. He organized campaigns against the Prussians, but their failures prompted him to settle the Teutonic Knights in the area. They arrived in Chełmno Land at the turn of 1227 and 1228, founding a small stronghold called Vogelsang, before later moving to Nieszawa.

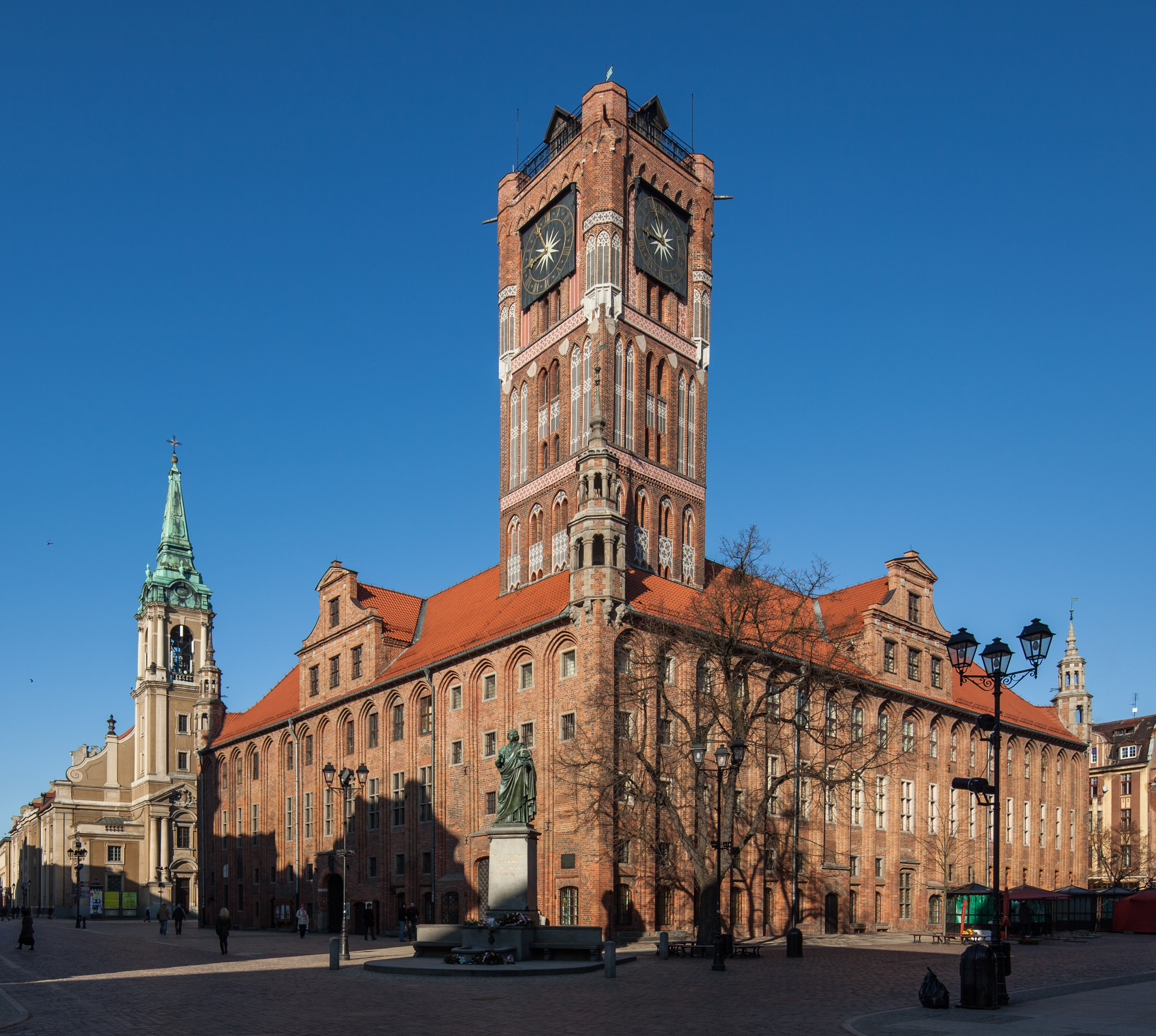
The Gothic Old Town Hall (Ratusz Staromiejski) dates back to the 13th century

In spring 1231 the Teutonic Knights along with Mazovian knights crossed the river Vistula near Nieszawa and established a fortress near today's village of Stary Toruń. On 28 December 1233, Teutonic Knights Hermann von Salza and Hermann Balk signed the city charters for Toruń (Thorn) and Chełmno (Kulm). The original document was lost in 1244. The set of rights in general is known as Kulm law. The municipal law was modeled on Silesian precedents, and the original inhabitants of both towns likewise came predominantly from Silesia.

In 1236, due to frequent flooding, it was relocated to the present site of the Old Town. In 1239 Franciscan friars settled in the city, followed in 1263 by Dominicans. In 1264 the adjacent New Town was founded, predominantly to house Torun's growing population of craftsmen and artisans, who predominantly came from German-speaking lands. In 1280, the city (or as it was then, both cities) joined the mercantile Hanseatic League, and thus became an important medieval trade centre.

In the 14th century, papal verdicts ordered the restoration of the area to Poland; however, the Teutonic Knights did not comply and continued to occupy the region. The city was recaptured by Poland in 1410 during the Polish–Lithuanian–Teutonic War. During the war, the city council maintained contact and cooperated with Polish King Władysław II Jagiełło; however, after the First Peace of Thorn was signed in the city in February 1411, the city fell back to the Teutonic Order. In 1411, the city left the Hanseatic League. In the 1420s, Polish King Władysław II Jagiełło built the Dybów Castle, located in present-day left-bank Toruń, which he visited numerous times. During the next big Polish–Teutonic War, Dybów Castle was occupied by the Teutonic Knights from 1431 to 1435. The city refused to pay taxes to the Teutonic Knights, not wanting to finance their war against Poland.

In 1440, the gentry of Toruń co-founded the Prussian Confederation to further oppose the Knights' policies. From 1452, talks between Polish King Casimir IV Jagiellon and the burghers of the Confederation were held at Dybów Castle. The Confederation rose against the Monastic state of the Teutonic Knights in 1454 and its delegation submitted a petition to Polish King Casimir IV Jagiellon asking him to regain power over the region as its rightful ruler. An act of incorporation was signed in Kraków 6 March 1454, recognizing the region (including Toruń), as part of the Polish Kingdom.

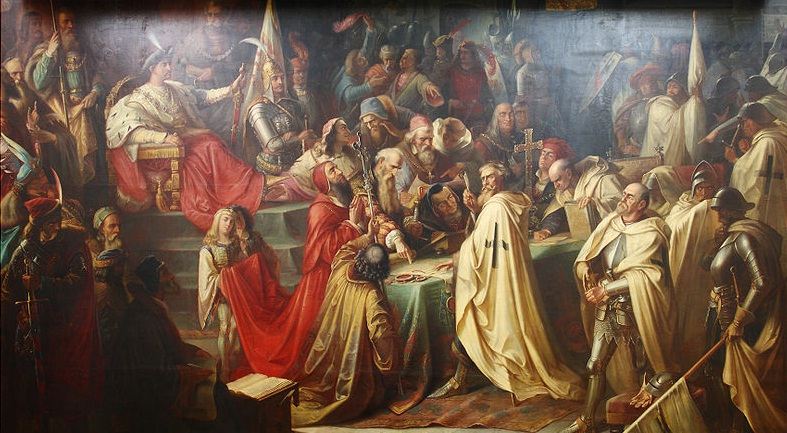
Second Peace of Toruń, 19th-century painting by Toruń-born painter Marian Jaroczyński, exhibited in the local District Museum

These events led to the Thirteen Years' War. The citizens of the city, enraged by the Order's ruthless exploitation, conquered the Teutonic castle, and dismantled the fortifications brick by brick, except for the Gdanisko tower which was used until the 18th century to store gunpowder. The local mayor pledged allegiance to the Polish king during the incorporation in March 1454 in Kraków, and then in May 1454, an official ceremony was held in Toruń, in which the nobility, knights, landowners, mayors, and local officials from Chełmno Land, including Toruń, again solemnly swore allegiance to the Polish king and the Kingdom of Poland. Since 1454, the city has been authorized by King Casimir IV to mint Polish coins. During the war, Casimir IV often stayed at the Dybów Castle and Toruń financially supported the Polish Army. The New Town and the Old Town amalgamated in March 1454.

The Thirteen Years' War ended in 1466, with the Second Peace of Thorn, in which the Teutonic Order renounced any claims to the city and recognised it as part of Poland. The Polish king granted the town great privileges, similar to those of Gdańsk. Also in 1454 at Dybów Castle, the King issued the famous Statutes of Nieszawa, covering a set of privileges for the Polish nobility; an event that is regarded as the birth of the noble democracy in Poland, which lasted until the country's demise in 1795.

=== Early modern period ===
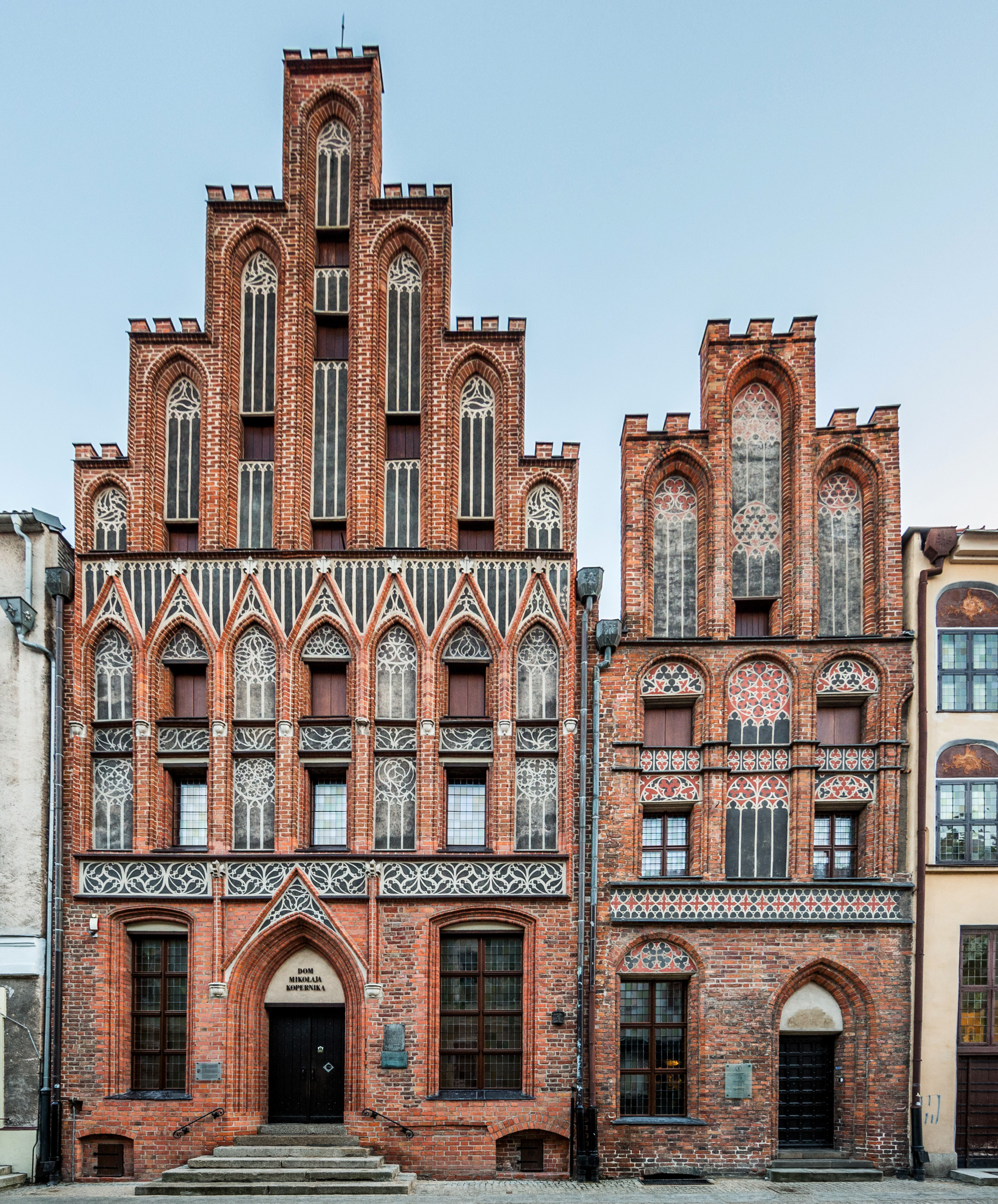
Copernicus' House, currently a museum

In 1473, Nicolaus Copernicus was born, and in 1501 Polish king John I Albert died in Toruń; his heart was buried in St. John's Cathedral. In 1500, the Tuba Dei, the largest church bell in Poland at the time, was installed at Toruń Cathedral, and a bridge across the Vistula was built, the country's longest wooden bridge at the time. In 1506, Toruń became a royal city of Poland. In 1528, the royal mint started operating in Toruń. In 1568, a gymnasium was founded, which after 1594 became one of the leading schools of northern Poland for centuries to come. Also in 1594, Toruń's first museum (Musaeum) was established at the school, beginning the city's museal traditions. A city of great wealth and influence, it enjoyed voting rights during the royal election period. Sejms of the Polish–Lithuanian Commonwealth were held in Toruń in 1576 and 1626.

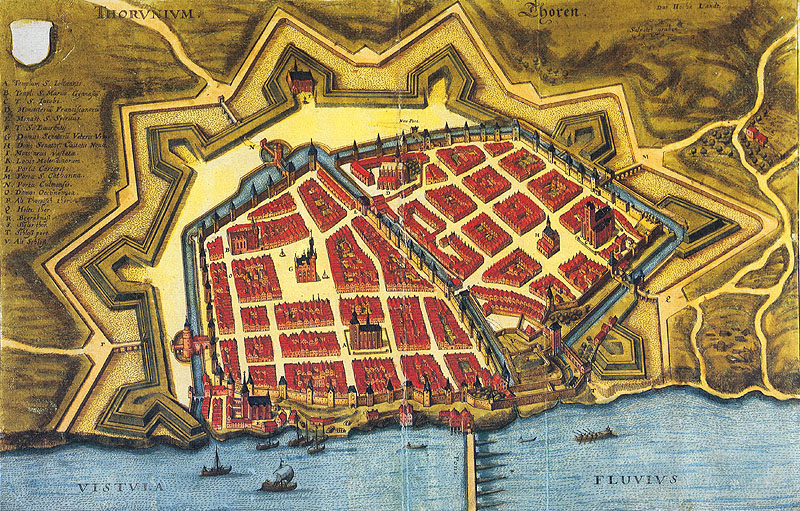
Toruń in 1641

In 1557, during the Protestant Reformation, the city adopted Protestantism. Under Mayor Heinrich Stroband (1586–1609), the city became centralized. Administrative power passed into the hands of the city council. In 1595, Jesuits arrived to promote the Counter-Reformation, taking control of St John's Church. Protestant city officials tried to limit the influx of Catholics into the city, as Catholics (Jesuits and Dominican friars) already controlled most of the churches, leaving only St Mary's for Protestant citizens. In 1645, at a time when religious conflicts occurred in many other European countries and the disastrous Thirty Years' War was fought west of Poland, in Toruń, on the initiative of King Władysław IV Vasa, a three-month congress of European Catholics, Lutherans, and Calvinists was held, known as Colloquium Charitativum; an important event in the history of interreligious dialogue.

During the Great Northern War (1700–21), the city was besieged by Swedish troops. The restoration of Augustus II the Strong as King of Poland was prepared in the city in the Treaty of Thorn (1709) by the Russian tsar Peter the Great. In the second half of the 17th century, tensions between Catholics and Protestants grew. In the early 18th century about 50 percent of the populace, especially the gentry and middle class, were German-speaking Protestants, while the other 50 percent were Polish-speaking Roman Catholics. Protestant influence was subsequently pushed back after the Tumult of Thorn of 1724.

=== Late modern period (from 1793) ===
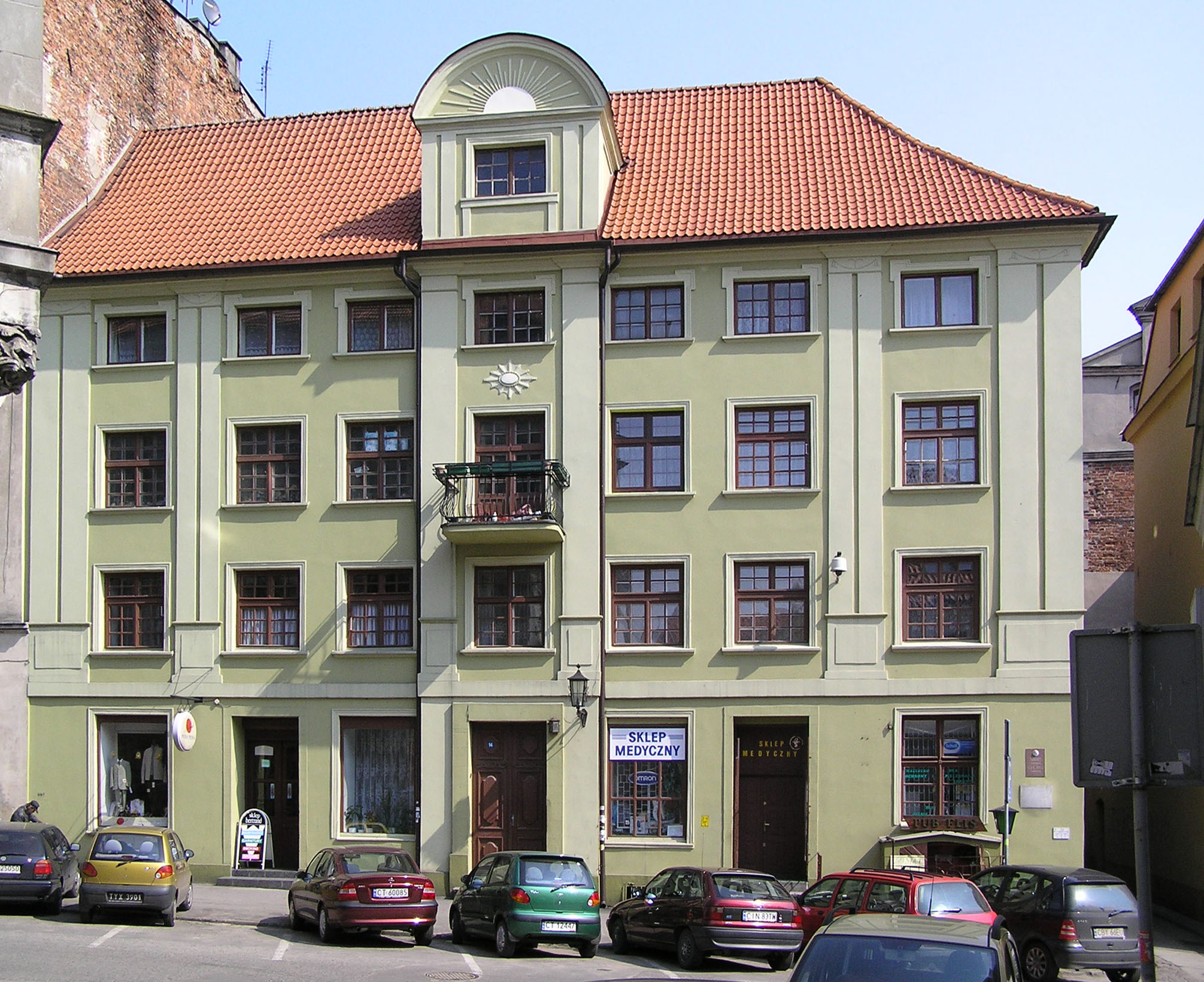
Birthplace and house of Polish economist and writer Fryderyk Skarbek, residence of his godson Fryderyk Chopin in 1825

After the Second Partition of Poland in 1793, the city was annexed by Prussia. It was briefly regained by Poles as part of the Duchy of Warsaw in 1807–1815, even serving as the temporary capital in April and May 1809. During these years the city began to attract a growing Jewish community. In 1809, Toruń was successfully defended by the Poles against the Austrians. After being re-annexed by Prussia in 1815, Toruń was subjected to Germanisation and became a strong center of Polish resistance against such policies. The city's first synagogue was inaugurated in 1847. New Polish institutions were established, such as Towarzystwo Naukowe w Toruniu (Toruń Scientific Society), a major Polish institution in the Prussian Partition of Poland, founded in 1875. After World War I, Poland declared independence and regained control over the city. In interwar Poland, Toruń was the capital of the Pomeranian Voivodeship.

=== World War II ===
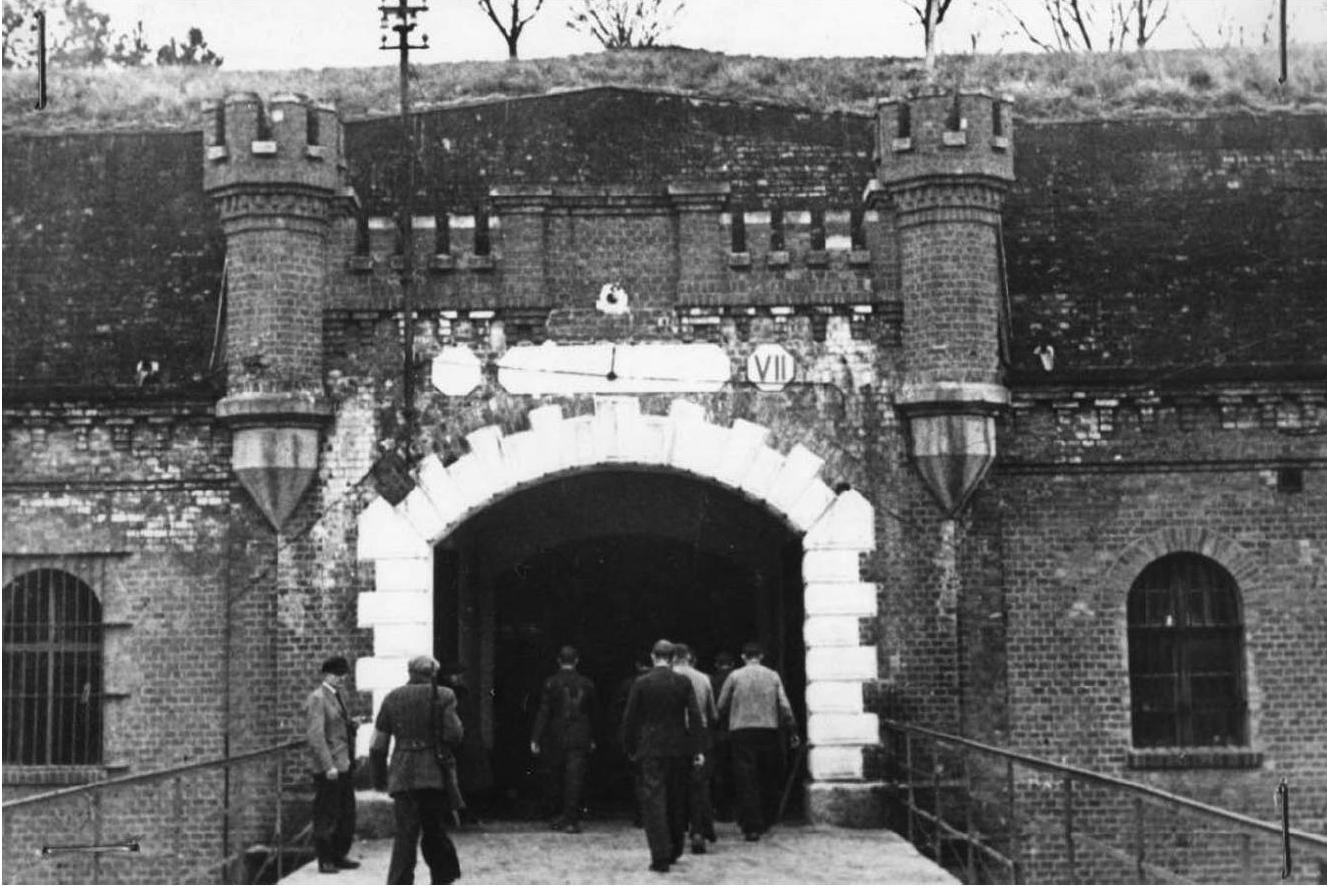
Arrested Poles and German guards at the gate of Fort VII in 1939

During World War II, Germany occupied the city from 7 September 1939 to 1 February 1945. Einsatzkommando 16 entered the city to commit various crimes against Poles. Under German occupation, local people were subjected to arrests, expulsions, slave labor, deportations to concentration camps and executions, especially the Polish elites as part of the Intelligenzaktion.

A group of Polish railwaymen and policemen from Toruń were murdered by the German gendarmerie and Wehrmacht in Gąbin on 19–21 September 1939. Local Poles, including activists, teachers and priests, arrested in Toruń and Toruń County beginning in September 1939, were initially held in the pre-war prison, and after it became overcrowded in October 1939, the Germans imprisoned Poles in Fort VII of the Toruń Fortress. On 17–19 October 1939 alone, the German police and the Selbstschutz arrested 1,200 Poles in Toruń and Toruń County. In early November 1939, the Germans carried out further mass arrests of Polish teachers, farmers and priests in Toruń and the county, who were then imprisoned in Fort VII. Imprisoned Poles were then either deported to concentration camps or murdered onsite.

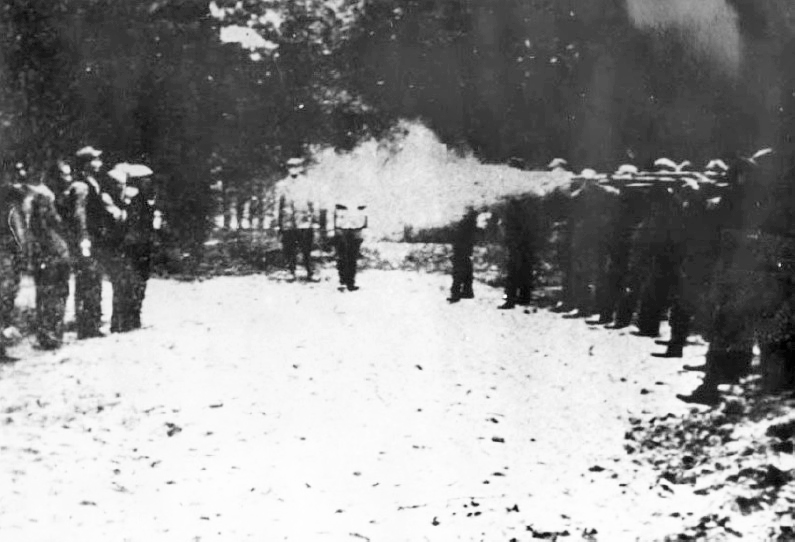
1939 Barbarka massacre

Large massacres of over 1,100 Poles from the city and region, including teachers, school principals, local officials, restaurateurs, shop owners, merchants, farmers, railwaymen, policemen, craftsmen, students, priests, workers, doctors, were carried out in the present-day district of Barbarka. Six mass graves were discovered after the war, in five of which the bodies of the victims were burned, as the Germans had tried to cover up the crime. Local teachers were also among Polish teachers murdered in the Sachsenhausen-Oranienburg, Mauthausen and Dachau concentration camps. Nonetheless, the Polish resistance movement was active in the city, and Toruń was the seat of one of the six main commands of the Union of Armed Struggle in occupied Poland (alongside Warsaw, Kraków, Poznań, Białystok and Lwów).

During the occupation, Germany established and operated Stalag XX-A prisoner-of-war camp in the city, with multiple forced labour subcamps in the region, in which Polish, British, French, Australian and Soviet POWs were held. From 1940 to 1943, in the northern part of the city the German transit camp Umsiedlungslager Thorn for Poles expelled from Toruń and the surrounding area, became infamous for inhuman sanitary conditions. Over 12,000 Poles passed through the camp, and around 1,000 died there, including about 400 children. From 1941 to 1945, a German forced labour camp was located in the city. In the spring of 1942, the Germans murdered 30 Polish scouts aged 13–16 in Fort VII.

While the city's population suffered many atrocities, as described, there were no battles or bombings that damaged its buildings. Thus, the city avoided damage during both World Wars, and retained its historic architecture, ranging from Gothic through Renaissance and Baroque to 19th and 20th century styles.

== Sights ==
Listed on the UNESCO list of World Heritage Sites since 1997, Toruń has many monuments of architecture dating back to the Middle Ages. The city is famous for having preserved almost intact its medieval spatial layout and many Gothic buildings, all built from brick, including monumental churches, the Town Hall and many burgher houses.

=== Gothic architecture ===
Gothic sights of Toruń (examples)

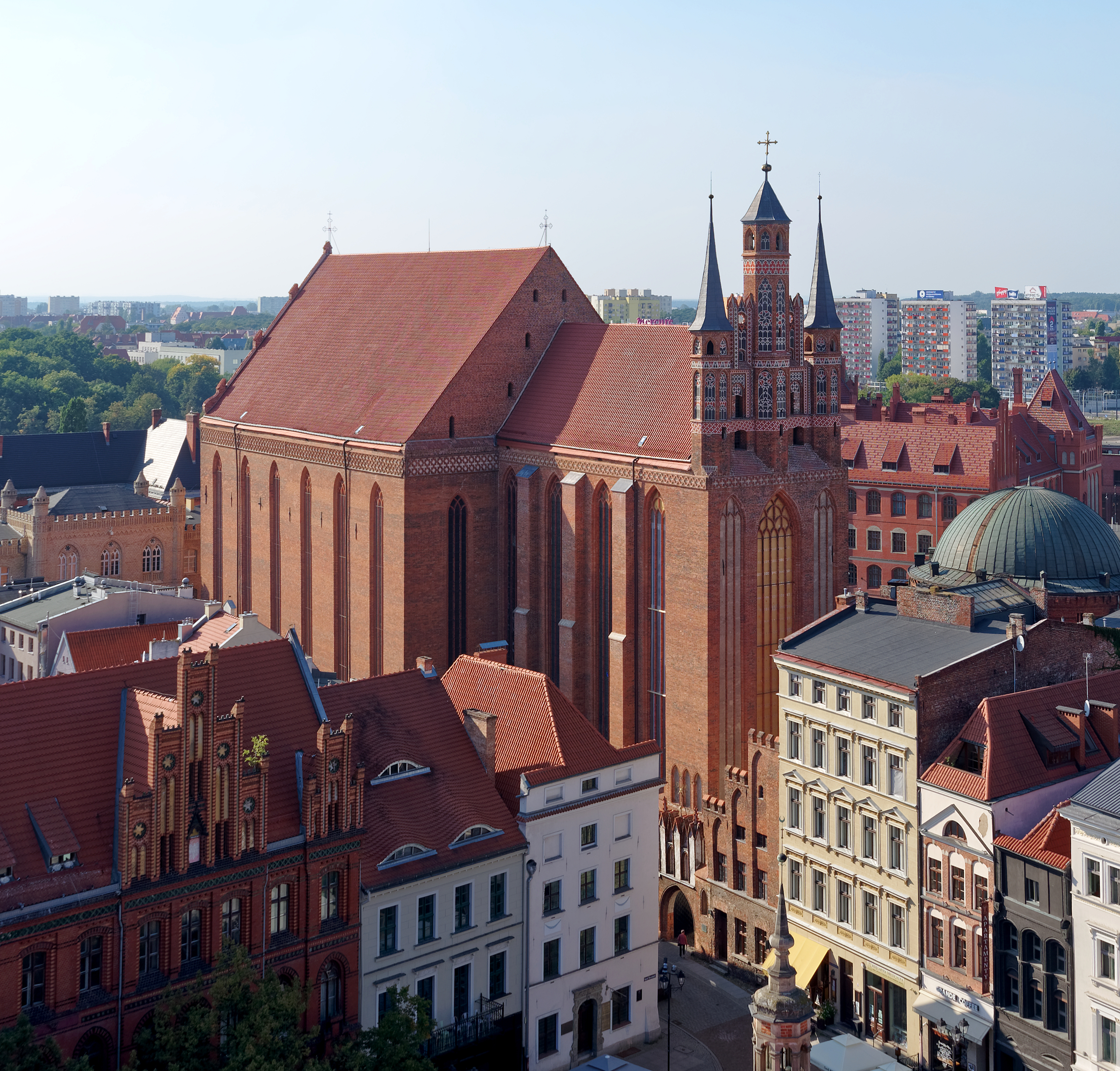
Assumption of Mary church

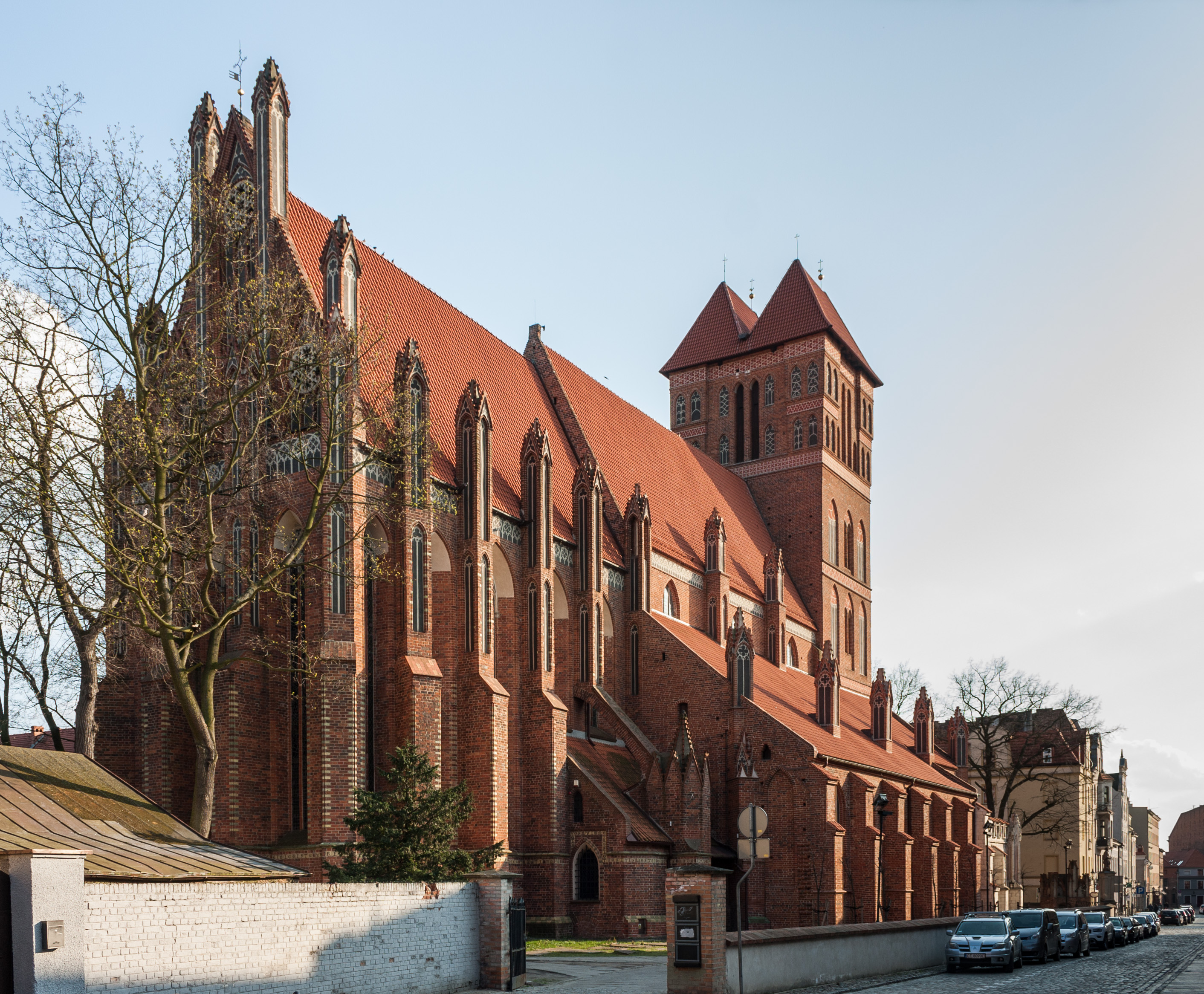
St. James the Greater Church

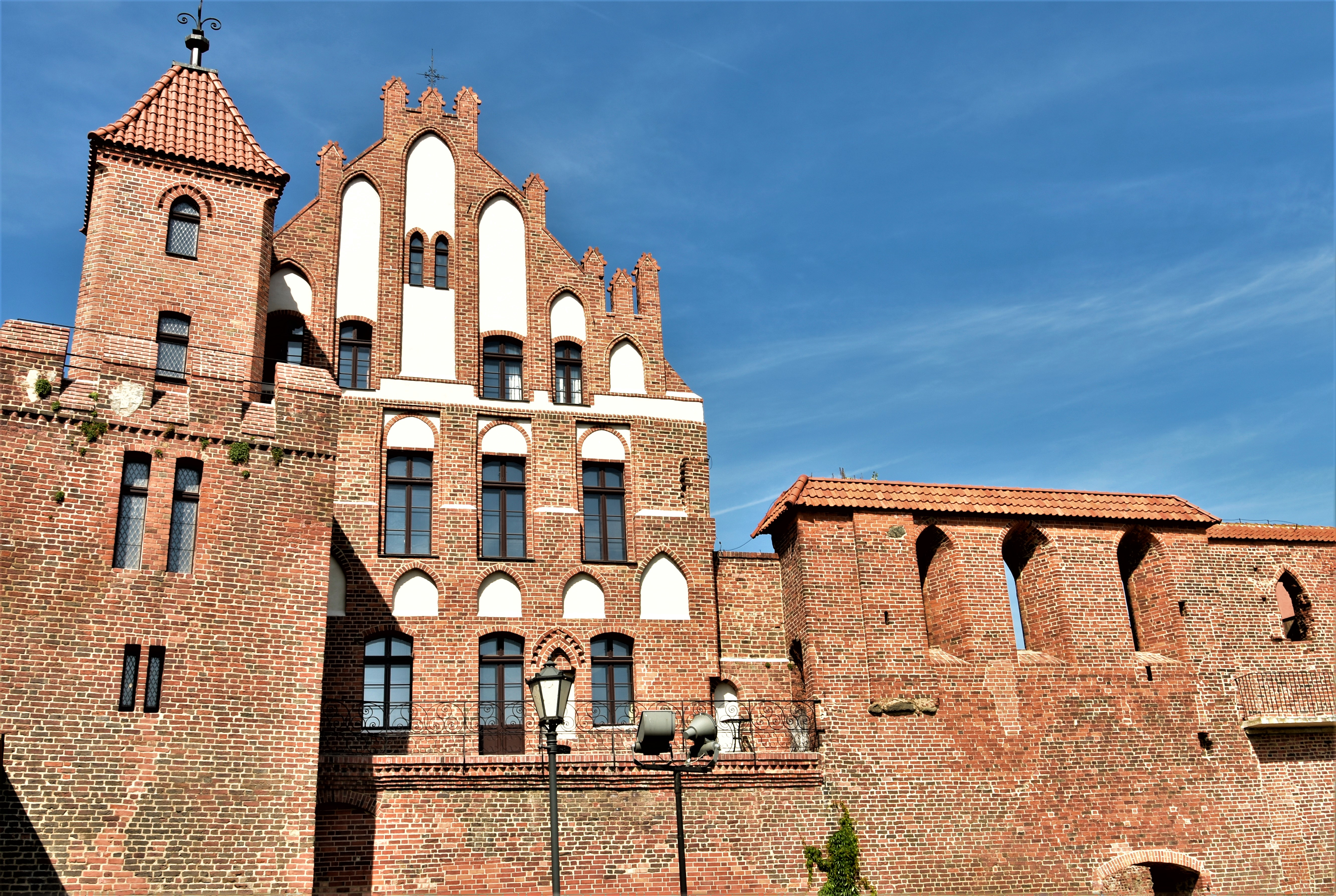
St. George Guildhall

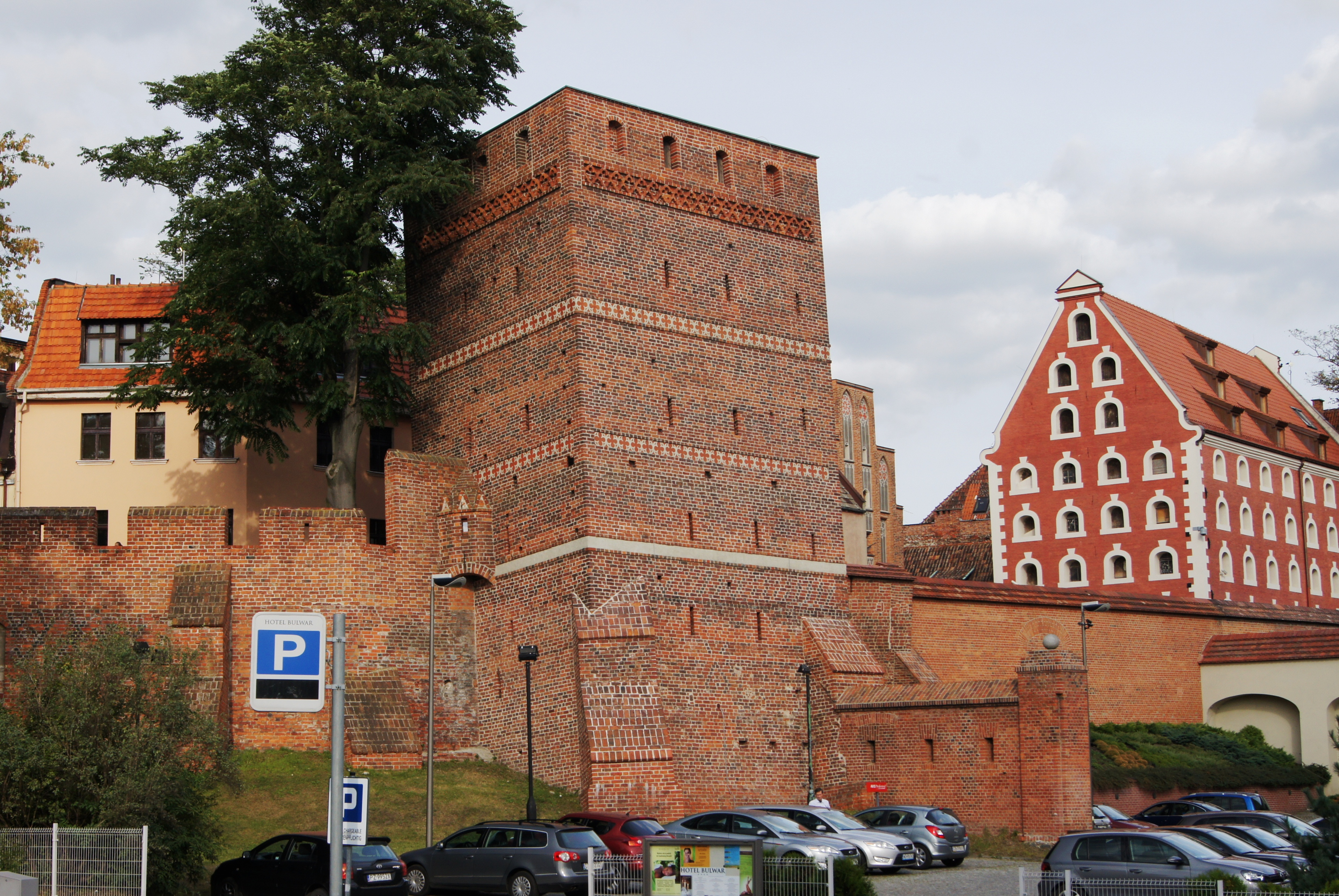
City walls and the Leaning Tower

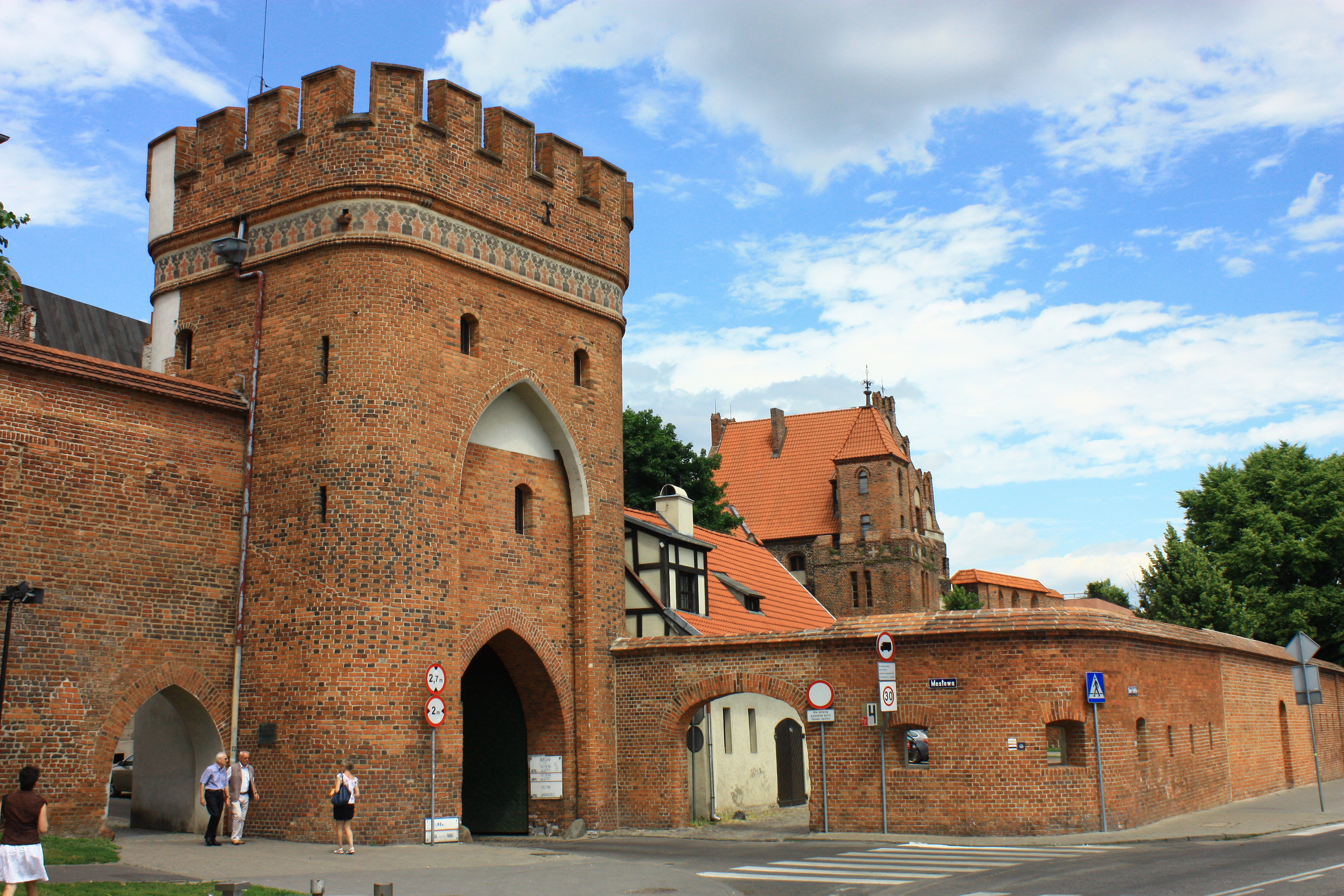
Brama Mostowa (Bridge Gate)

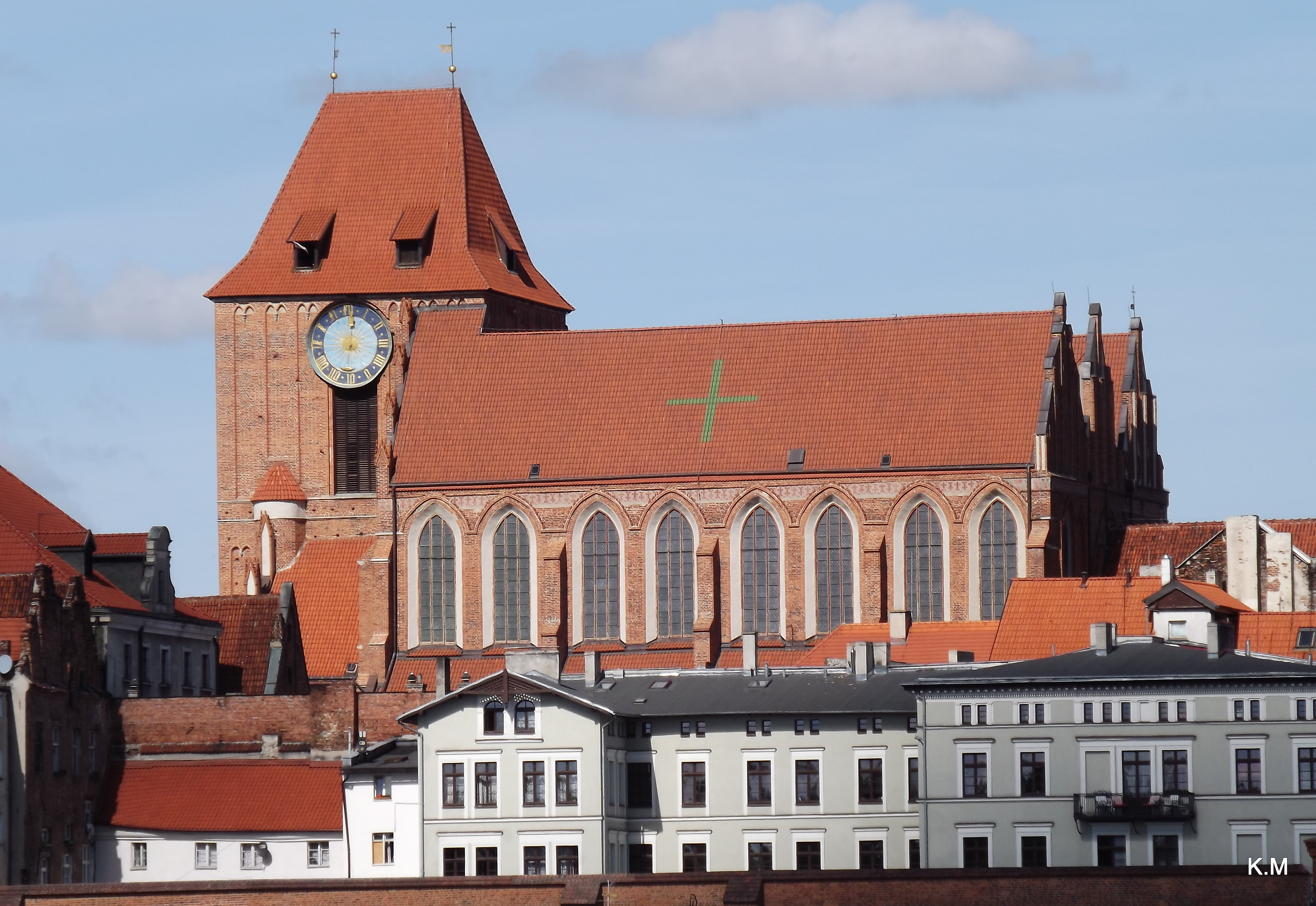
Toruń Cathedral

Toruń has the largest number of preserved Gothic houses in Poland, many with Gothic wall paintings or wood-beam ceilings from the 16th to the 18th centuries.

- The Cathedral of SS. John the Evangelist and John the Baptist, an aisled hall church built in the 14th century and extended in the 15th century; outstanding Gothic sculptures and paintings inside (Moses, St. Mary Magdalene, gravestone of Johann von Soest), Renaissance and Baroque epitaphs and altars (among them the epitaph of Copernicus from 1580), as well as the Tuba Dei, the largest medieval church bell in Poland and one of the largest in Europe
- St. Mary's church, a formerly Franciscan aisled hall built in the 14th century
- St. James the Greater's church (often mistakenly called St Jacob's), a basilica from the 14th century, with monumental wall paintings and Gothic stalls
- The Old Town Hall was inaugurated in 1274, then extended and rebuilt between 1391 and 1399, and extended again at the end of the 16th century; considered one of the most monumental town halls in Central Europe (Toruń Regional Museum or Muzeum Okręgowe in Polish)
- City fortifications, begun in the 13th century, extended between the 14th and 15th centuries, mostly demolished in the 19th century, but partially preserved with a few city gates and watchtowers (among them the so-called Leaning Tower) from the Vistula side. See also: Toruń Fortress
- A 15th-century Gothic house (now a museum) where Copernicus was reputedly born
- Ruins of 13th-century Teutonic Knights' castle
- House at the sign of the Star (Polish: Kamienica Pod Gwiazdą, the East Asian Museum, previously Gothic, briefly owned by Filip Callimachus, then rebuilt in the 16th century and in 1697, with a richly decorated stucco façade and wooden spiral stairs.
- Monastery Gate, a medieval gate that has survived to the present day

Toruń, unlike many other historic cities in Poland, escaped substantial destruction in World War II. Particularly left intact was the Old Town, all of whose important architectural monuments are originals, not reconstructions.

Major renovation projects have been undertaken in recent years to improve the condition and external presentation of the Old Town. Besides the renovation of various buildings, projects such as the reconstruction of the pavement of the streets and squares (reversing them to their historical appearance), and the introduction of new plants, trees and objects of 'small architecture', are underway.

Numerous buildings and other constructions, including the city walls along the boulevard, are illuminated at night, creating an impressive effect – probably unique among Polish cities with respect to the size of Toruń's Old Town and the scale of the illumination project itself.

Toruń is also home to the Zoo and Botanical Garden opened in 1965 and 1797 respectively and is one of the city's popular tourist attractions.

== Districts ==
Districts of Toruń

Toruń is divided into 24 administrative districts (dzielnica) or boroughs, each with a degree of autonomy within its own municipal government. The Districts include: Barbarka, Bielany, Bielawy, Bydgoskie Przedmieście, Chełmińskie Przedmieście, Czerniewice, Glinki, Grębocin nad Strugą, Jakubskie Przedmieście, Kaszczorek, Katarzynka, Koniuchy, Mokre, Na Skarpie, Piaski, Podgórz, Rubinkowo, Rudak, Rybaki, Stare Miasto (Old Town), Starotoruńskie Przedmieście, Stawki, Winnica, Wrzosy.

== Symbols ==
The colors of Toruń are white and blue in the horizontal arrangement, white top, blue bottom, equal in size. The flag of the city of Toruń is a bipartite sheet. The upper field is white, the lower field is blue. If the flag is hung vertically, the upper edge of the flag must be on the left.

The flag with the coat of arms is also in use. The ratio of the height of the coat of arms to the width of the flag is 1:2.

== Climate ==
The climate can be described as humid continental (Köppen: Dfb) if the isotherm of 0 °C (32 °F) is used or an oceanic climate (Cfb) if the −3 °C (27 °F) isotherm is adopted. Back in 1930s, the city passed close to the original boundary and dividing line of climates C and D groups in the north–south direction proposed by climatologist Wladimir Köppen. Toruń is in the transition between the milder climates of the west and north of the Poland and the more extreme ones like the south (warmer summer) and the east (colder winter). It is not much different from the climates of more southerly Kraków and easterly Warsaw, though it has slightly milder winters and more moderate summers.

Being close to definitely continental climates, it has a high variability caused by the contact of eastern continental air masses and western oceanic ones. This is influenced by the geographical location of the city – the Toruń Basin to the south, and the Vistula Valley to the north.

Climate data for Toruń (St. Joseph), elevation: 69 m, 1991–2020 normals, extremes 1951–present
Month	Jan	Feb	Mar	Apr	May	Jun	Jul	Aug	Sep	Oct	Nov	Dec	Year
Record high °C (°F)	12.8 (55.0)	17.1 (62.8)	23.4 (74.1)	31.2 (88.2)	32.3 (90.1)	40.3 (104.5)	38.2 (100.8)	37.5 (99.5)	35.1 (95.2)	28.2 (82.8)	19.9 (67.8)	15.6 (60.1)	40.3 (104.5)
Mean daily maximum °C (°F)	1.4 (34.5)	3.2 (37.8)	7.6 (45.7)	14.6 (58.3)	19.8 (67.6)	23.0 (73.4)	25.1 (77.2)	24.9 (76.8)	19.3 (66.7)	13.1 (55.6)	6.6 (43.9)	2.7 (36.9)	13.4 (56.1)
Daily mean °C (°F)	−1.1 (30.0)	−0.1 (31.8)	3.2 (37.8)	8.8 (47.8)	13.8 (56.8)	17.1 (62.8)	19.3 (66.7)	18.9 (66.0)	13.9 (57.0)	8.7 (47.7)	4.0 (39.2)	0.4 (32.7)	8.9 (48.0)
Mean daily minimum °C (°F)	−3.8 (25.2)	−3.1 (26.4)	−0.9 (30.4)	3.1 (37.6)	7.8 (46.0)	11.3 (52.3)	13.6 (56.5)	13.2 (55.8)	9.1 (48.4)	5.0 (41.0)	1.5 (34.7)	−2.1 (28.2)	4.6 (40.3)
Record low °C (°F)	−32.4 (−26.3)	−29.3 (−20.7)	−26.5 (−15.7)	−8.6 (16.5)	−7.2 (19.0)	−1.4 (29.5)	3.1 (37.6)	1.4 (34.5)	−3.7 (25.3)	−10.1 (13.8)	−22.8 (−9.0)	−24.5 (−12.1)	−32.4 (−26.3)
Average precipitation mm (inches)	32.7 (1.29)	27.3 (1.07)	32.2 (1.27)	29.6 (1.17)	51.2 (2.02)	55.7 (2.19)	90.6 (3.57)	63.9 (2.52)	55.8 (2.20)	37.9 (1.49)	33.5 (1.32)	38.5 (1.52)	548.8 (21.61)
Average extreme snow depth cm (inches)	6.1 (2.4)	5.7 (2.2)	3.0 (1.2)	1.1 (0.4)	0.0 (0.0)	0.0 (0.0)	0.0 (0.0)	0.0 (0.0)	0.0 (0.0)	0.0 (0.0)	1.5 (0.6)	4.2 (1.7)	6.1 (2.4)
Average precipitation days (≥ 0.1 mm)	16.07	13.30	13.33	10.73	12.83	13.47	13.63	12.53	11.63	12.73	14.27	16.27	160.80
Average snowy days (≥ 0 cm)	14.8	12.1	5.4	0.5	0.0	0.0	0.0	0.0	0.0	0.0	2.3	9.1	44.2
Average relative humidity (%)	87.1	83.2	76.7	68.3	67.8	68.9	70.2	70.7	77.8	83.1	89.0	88.9	77.6
Mean monthly sunshine hours	44.7	68.2	124.0	196.1	244.0	237.4	239.2	233.5	157.3	106.7	44.2	34.9	1,730.1
Source 1: Institute of Meteorology and Water Management
Source 2: Meteomodel.pl (records, relative humidity 1991–2020)

== Demographics ==
Historical population
Year	Pop.	±%
1950	75,734	—
1960	104,800	+38.4%
1970	129,400	+23.5%
1978	165,294	+27.7%
1988	199,527	+20.7%
2002	211,243	+5.9%
2011	204,954	−3.0%
2021	198,273	−3.3%

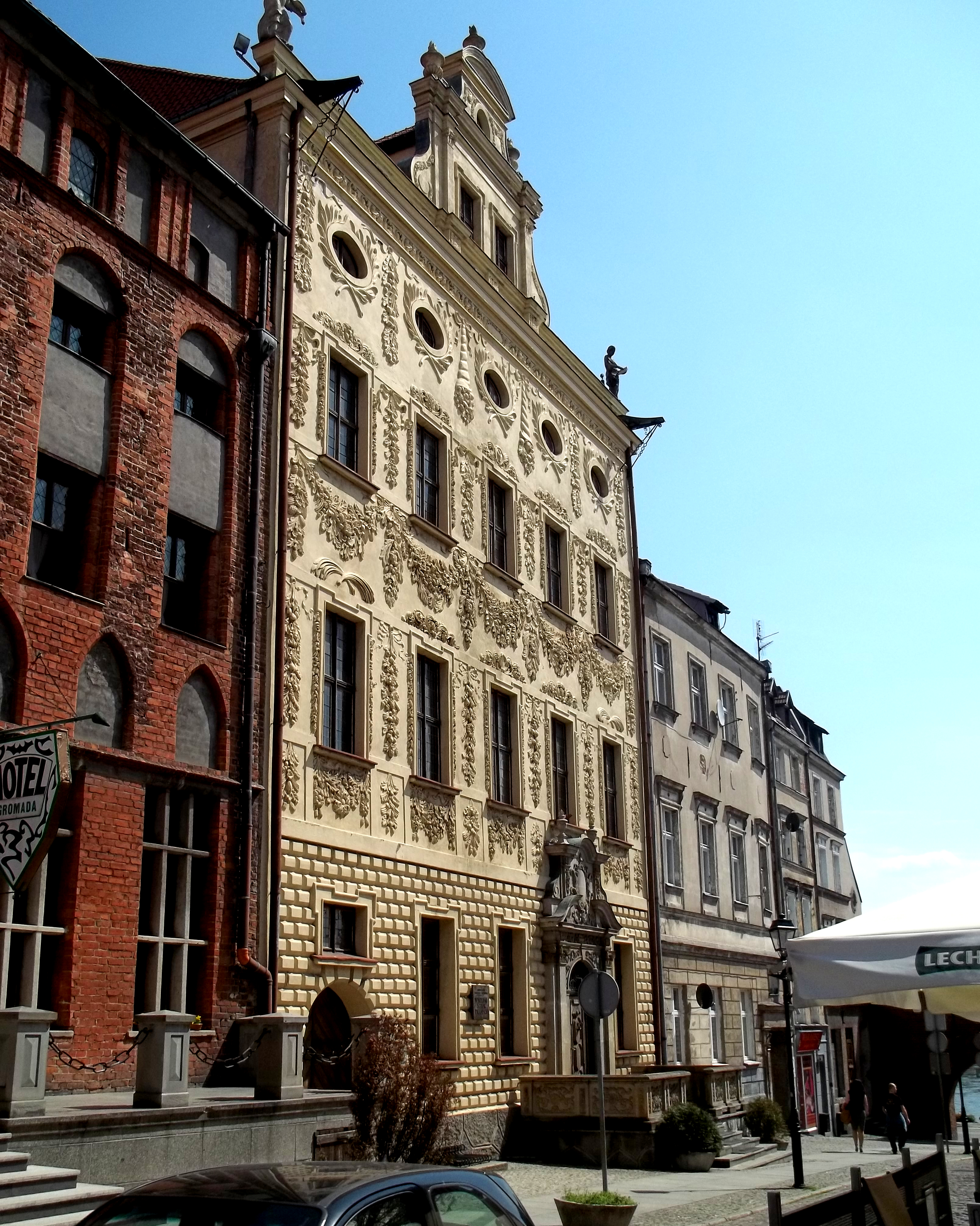
Dąmbski Palace – a baroque residence located on Żeglarska Street

The most recent statistics show a decrease in the population of the city, from 211,169 in 2001 (highest) to 202,562 in 2018. Among the demographic trends influencing this decline, are: suburbanisation, migration to larger urban centres, and wider trends observed in the whole of Poland such as general population decline, slowed down by immigration in 2017. The birth rate in the city in 2017 was 0.75. Low birth rates have been consistent in the city for the first two decades of the 21st century.

The official forecasts from Statistics Poland state that by 2050 the city population will have declined to 157,949.

Inside the city itself, most of the population is concentrated on the right (northern) bank of the Vistula river. Two of the most densely populated areas are Rubinkowo and Na Skarpie, housing projects built mostly in the 1970s and 1980s, located between the central and easternmost districts; their total population is about 70,000.

The Bydgoszcz–Toruń metro area of Toruń and Bydgoszcz, their counties, and a number of smaller towns, may in total have a population of as much as 800,000. Thus the area contains about one third of the population of the Kuyavia-Pomerania region (which has about 2.1 million inhabitants).

== Transport ==
The transport network in the city has undergone major development in recent years. The partial completion of ring road (East and South), the completion of the second bridge (2013) and various road, and cycling lane improvements, including construction of Trasa Średnicowa, have decidedly improved the traffic in the city. However, noise barriers that have been erected along the new or refurbished roads have been criticised as not conducive to a beautiful urban landscape. The extensive roadworks have also drawn attention to the declining population numbers, casting doubt that the city might over-deliver for the future number of road users, as the demographic trends forecast from Statistics Poland predicts a reduction of population by almost 1/4 by year 2050.

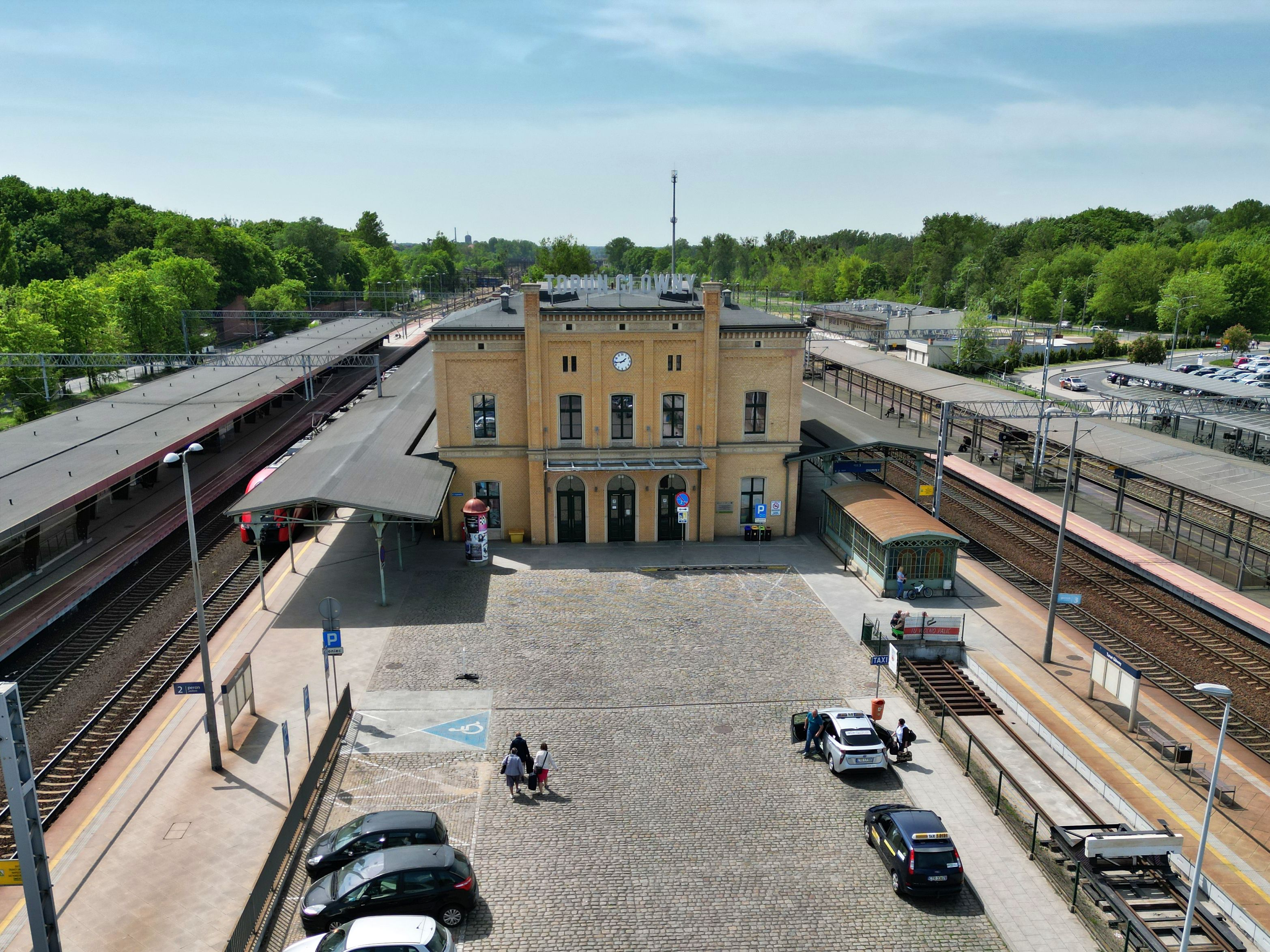
Toruń Główny railway station (main railway station)

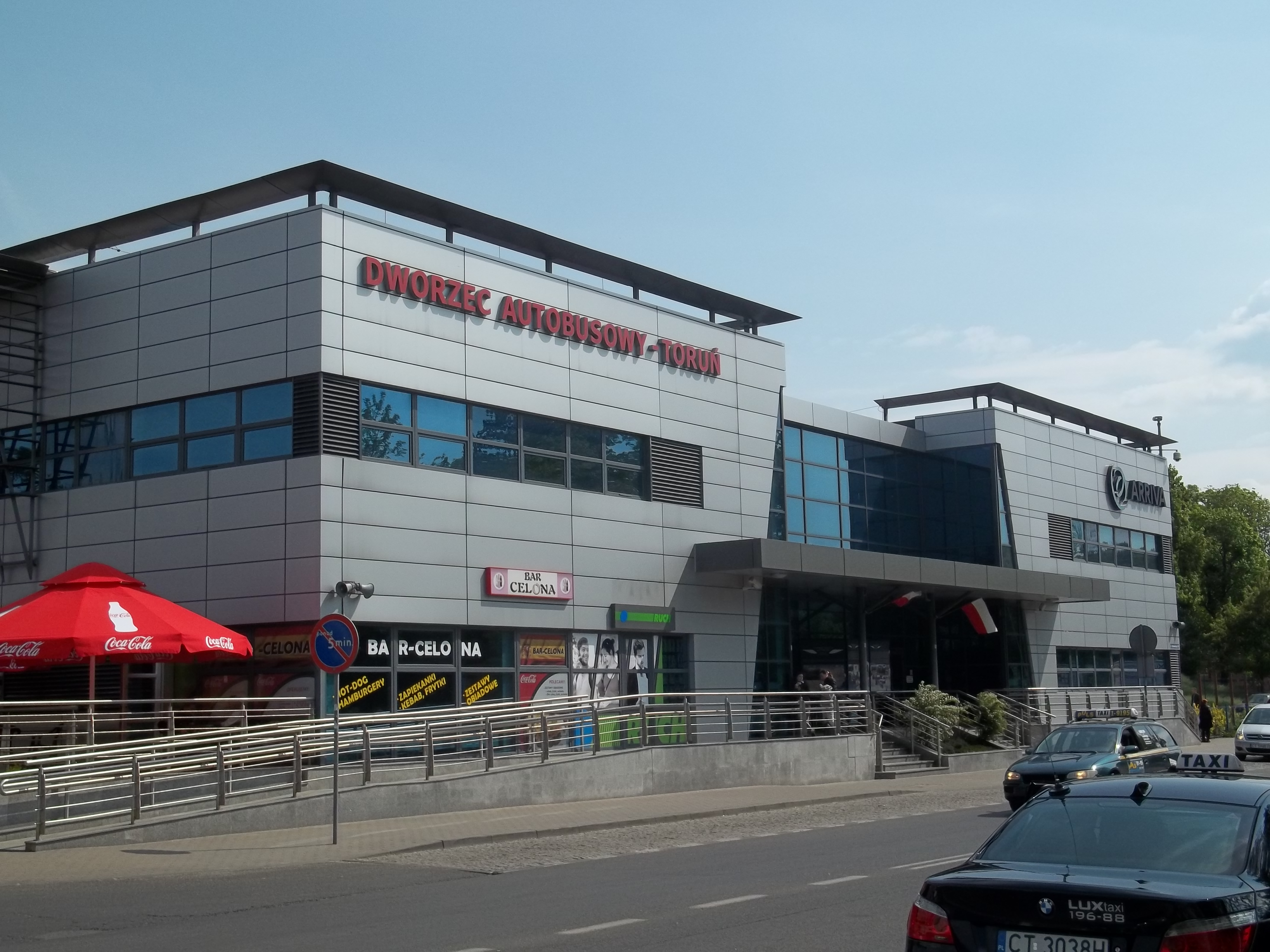
Main Bus Station

The city's public transport system consists of an extensive tram network with seven lines. The Tram network operates exclusively on the northern bank of the Vistula river.

In addition to the tram network, the city runs 40 day time bus routes and six night time bus routes, covering the city and some of the neighboring communities including the southern side of the city.

Toruń is situated at a major road junction, one of the most important in Poland. The A1 highway reaches Toruń, and a southern beltway surrounds the city. Besides these, the European route E75 and a number of domestic roads (numbered 10, 15, and 80) run through the city.

With three main railway stations (Toruń Główny, Toruń Miasto and Toruń Wschodni), the city is a major rail junction, with two important lines crossing there (Warsaw–Bydgoszcz and Wrocław–Olsztyn). Two other lines stem from Toruń, toward Malbork and Sierpc.

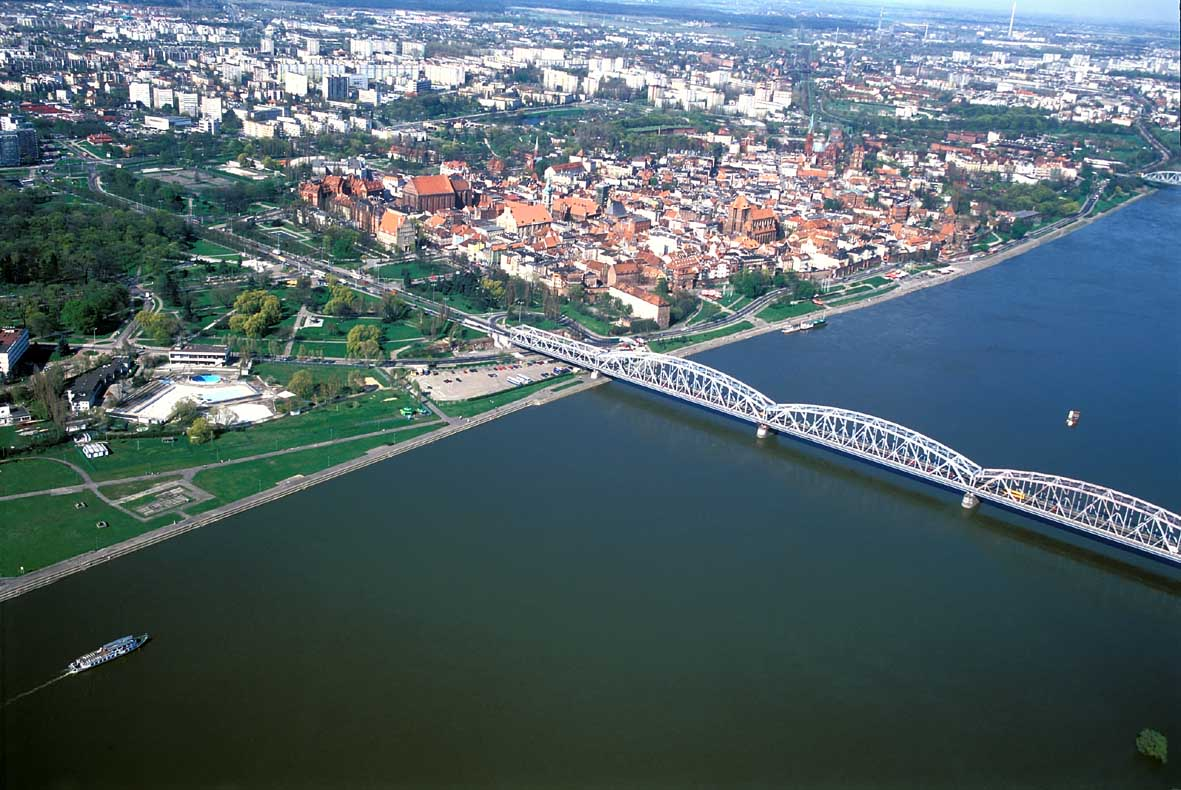
Józef Piłsudski Bridge over the Vistula river, the older of the two road bridges in Toruń

The rail connection with Bydgoszcz is run under a name "BiT City" as a "metropolitan rail". Its main purpose is to allow traveling between and within these cities using one ticket. A joint venture of Toruń, Bydgoszcz, Solec Kujawski and the voivodeship, it is considered as important in integrating Bydgoszcz-Toruń metropolitan area. A major modernization of BiT City railroute, as well as a purchase of completely new vehicles to serve the line, is planned for 2008 and 2009. Technically, it will allow to travel between Toruń-East and Bydgoszcz-Airport stations at a speed of 120 km/h (75 mph) in a time of approximately half an hour. In a few years' time "BiT City" will be integrated with local transportation systems of Toruń and Bydgoszcz, thus creating a uniform metropolitan transportation network – with all necessary funds having been secured in 2008.

Since September 2008, the "one-ticket" solution has been introduced also as regards a rail connection with Włocławek, as a "regional ticket". The same is planned for connection with Grudziądz.

Two bus depots serve to connect the city with other towns and cities in Poland.

As of 2008, a small sport airfield exists in Toruń; however, a modernization of the airport is seriously considered with a number of investors interested in it. Independently of this, Bydgoszcz Ignacy Jan Paderewski Airport, located about 50 kilometres (31 miles) from Toruń city centre, serves the whole Bydgoszcz-Toruń metropolitan area, with a number of regular flights to European cities.

== Economy ==
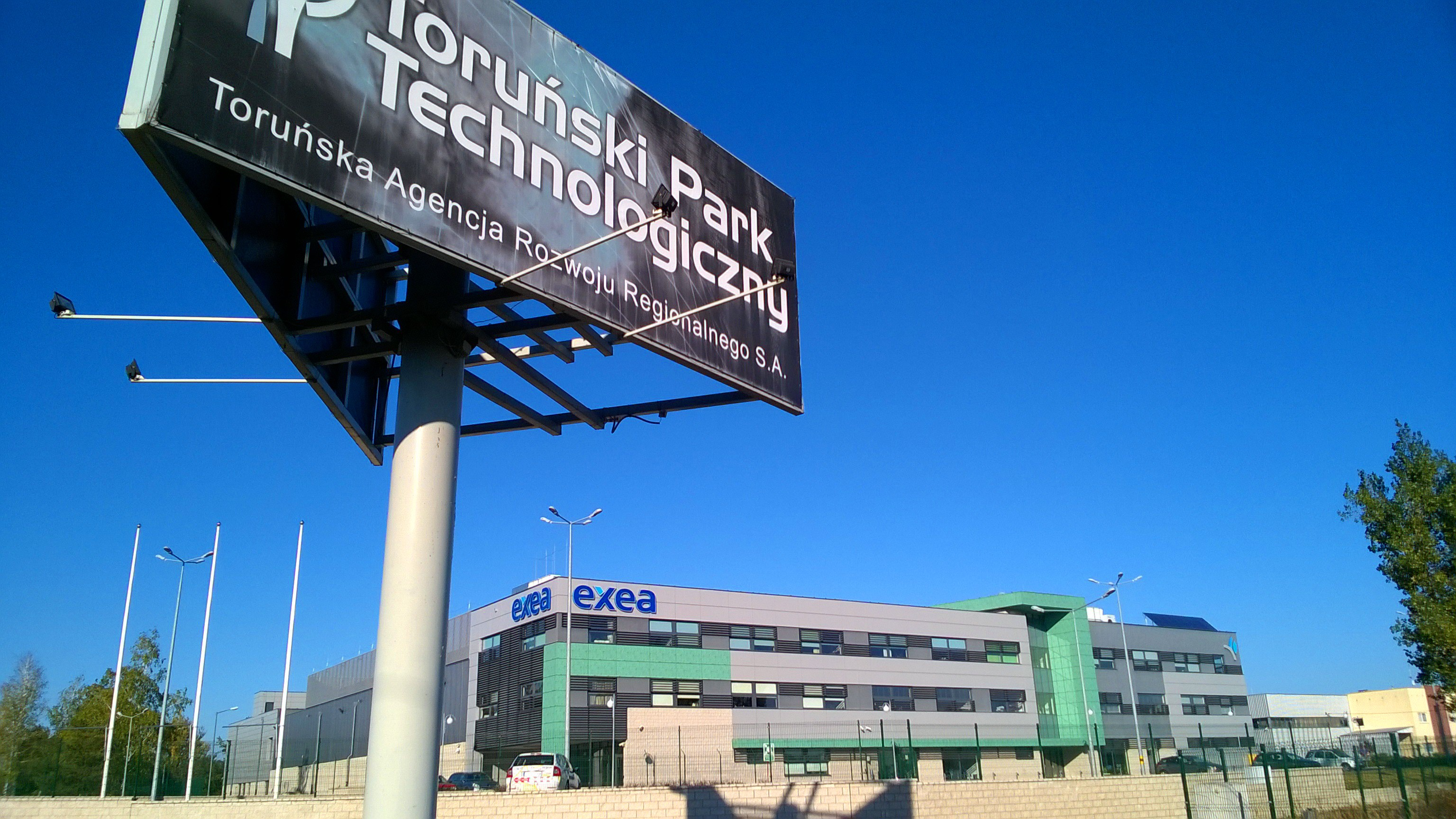
Toruń's Technology Park

Although a medium-sized city, Toruń is the site of the headquarters of some of the largest companies in Poland, or at least of their subsidiaries. The official unemployment rate, as of September 2008, is 5.4%.

In 2006, construction of new plants owned by Sharp Corporation and other companies of mainly Japanese origin has started in the neighboring community of Łysomice – about 10 kilometres (6 miles) from city centre. The facilities under construction are located in a newly created special economic zone. As a result of cooperation of the companies mentioned above, a vast high-tech complex is to be constructed in the next few years, providing as many as 10,000 jobs (a prediction for) at the cost of about 450 million euros. As of 2008, the creation of another special economic zone is being considered, this time inside city limits.

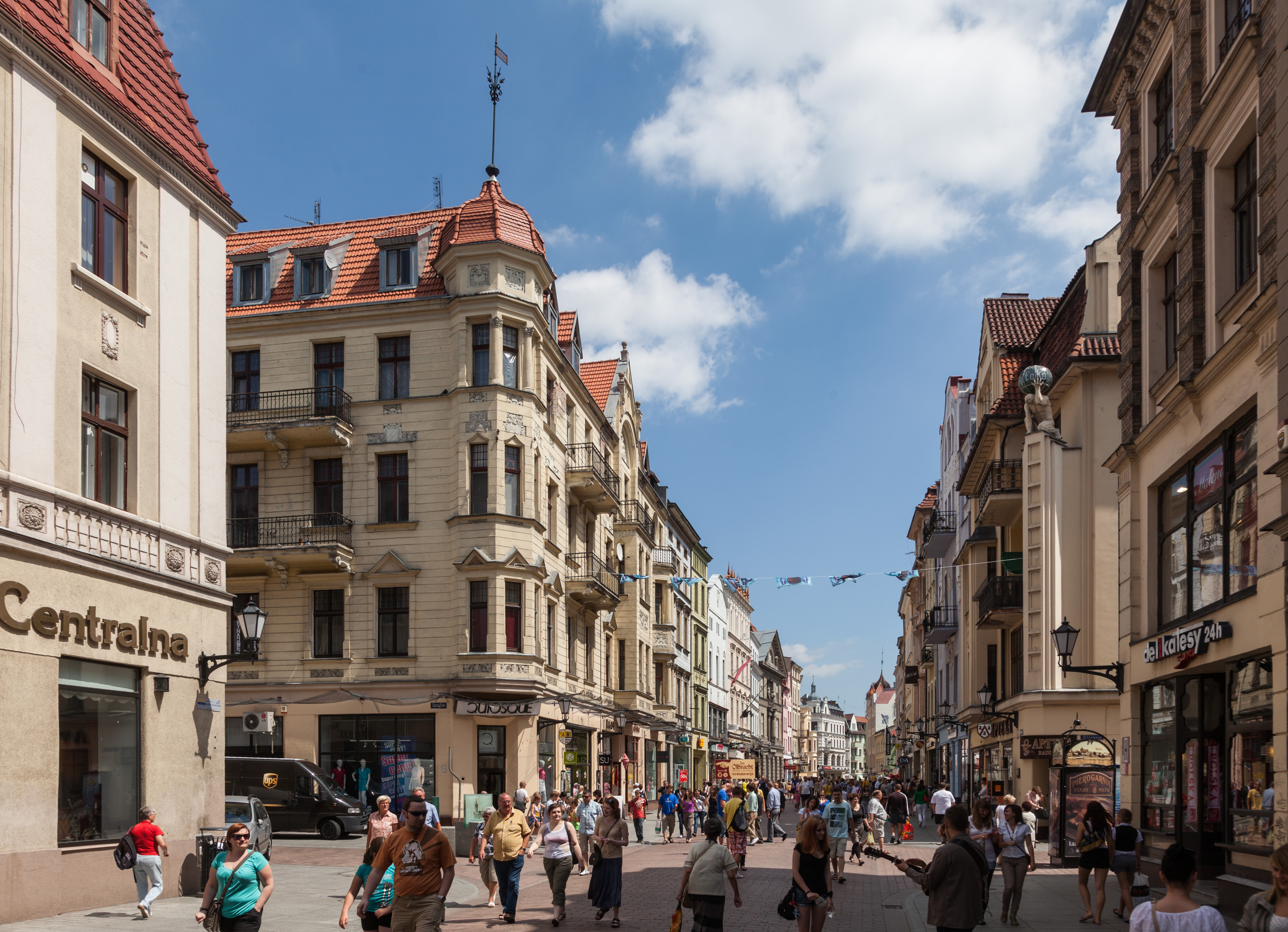
Toruń's city centre incorporates a large commercial district

Thanks to its architectural heritage Toruń is visited by more than 1.5 million tourists a year (1.6 million in 2007). This makes tourism an important branch of the local economy, although time spent in the city by individual tourists or the number of hotels, which can serve them, are still not considered satisfactory. Major investments in renovation of the city's monuments, building new hotels (including high-standard ones), improvement in promotion, as well as launching new cultural and scientific events and facilities, give very good prospects for Toruń's tourism.

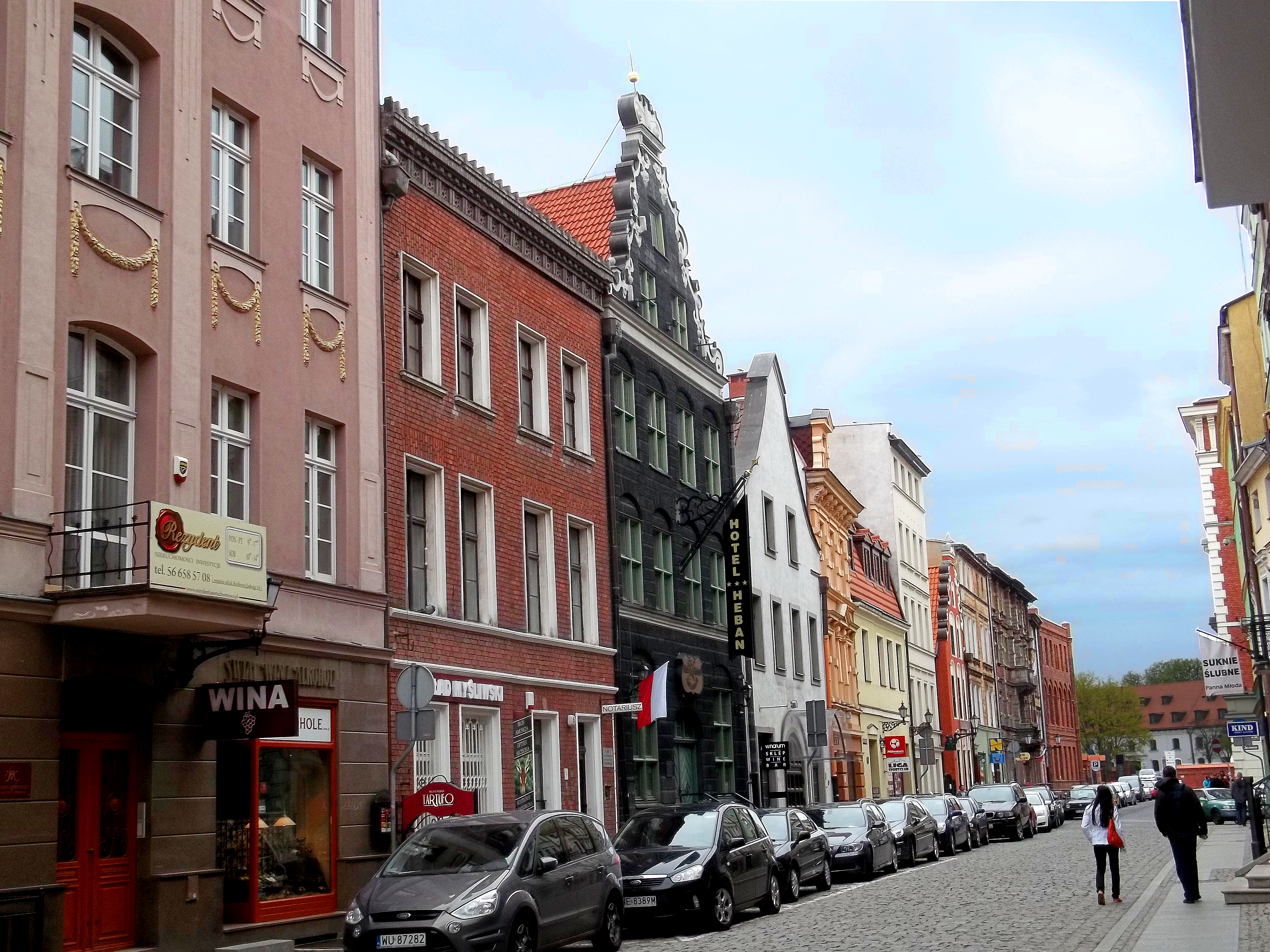
Małe Garbary, a typical street in the Old Town of Toruń

In recent years Toruń has been a site of intense building construction investments, mainly residential and in its transportation network. The latter has been possible partly due to the use of European Union funds assigned for new member states. Toruń city county generates by far the highest number of new dwellings built each year among all Kuyavian-Pomeranian counties, both relative to its population as well as in absolute values. It has led to almost complete rebuilding of some districts. As of 2008, many major constructions are either under development or are to be launched soon – the value of some of them exceeding 100 million euros. They include a new speedway stadium, major shopping and entertainment centres, a commercial complex popularly called a "New Centre of Toruń", a music theater, a centre of contemporary art, hotels, office buildings, facilities for the Nicolaus Copernicus University, roads and tram routes, sewage and fresh water delivery systems, residential projects, the possibility of a new bridge over the Vistula, and more. Construction of the A1 motorway and the BiT City fast metropolitan railway also directly affects the city. About 25,000 local firms are registered in Toruń.

== Culture ==
The internationally renowned film festival Camerimage was founded in Toruń in 1993, and has been held annually in the city since 2019. In 2024, with Australian actress Cate Blanchett as jury president, the 32nd International Film Festival of the Art of Cinematography Camerimage screened Steve McQueen's historical war drama Blitz, the first half of Jon M. Chu's two-part musical fantasy film Wicked, and the world premiere of Joel Souza's western film Rust.

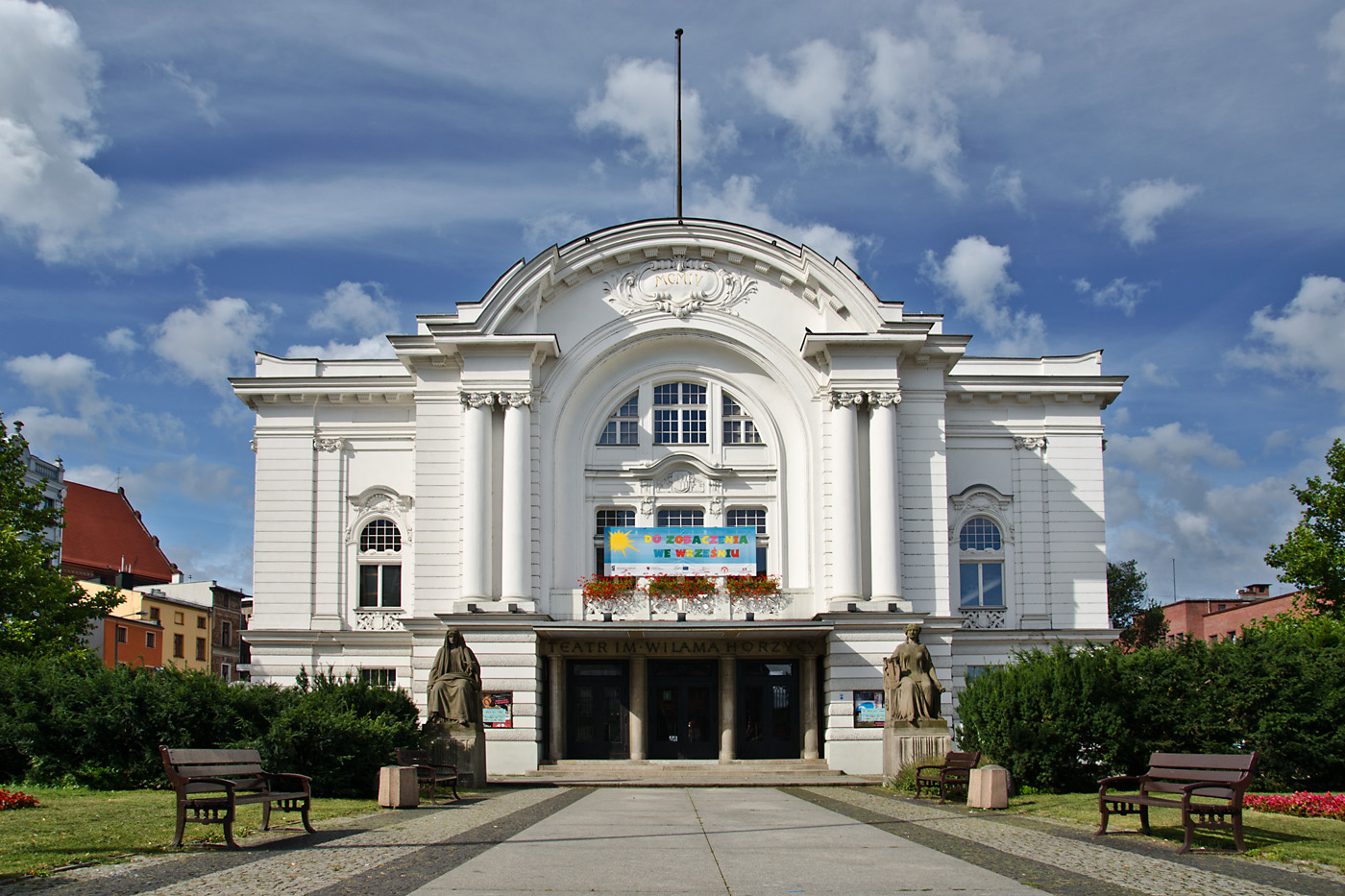
Toruń's main stage, the Wilam Horzyca Theatre

Toruń has two drama theatres (Teatr im. Wilama Horzycy with three stages and Teatr Wiczy), two children's theatres (Baj Pomorski and Zaczarowany Świat), two music theatres (Mała Rewia, Studencki Teatr Tańca), and numerous other theatre groups. The city hosts, among others events, the international theatre festival, "Kontakt", annually in May.

A building called Baj Pomorski has recently been completely reconstructed. It is now one of the most modern cultural facilities in the city, with its front elevation in the shape of a gigantic chest of drawers. It is located at the south-east edge of the Old Town. Toruń has two cinemas including a Cinema City, which has over 2,000 seats.

Over ten major museums document the history of Toruń and the region. Among others, the "House of Kopernik" and the accompanying museum commemorate Nicolaus Copernicus and his revolutionary work, the university museum reveals the history of the city's academic past.

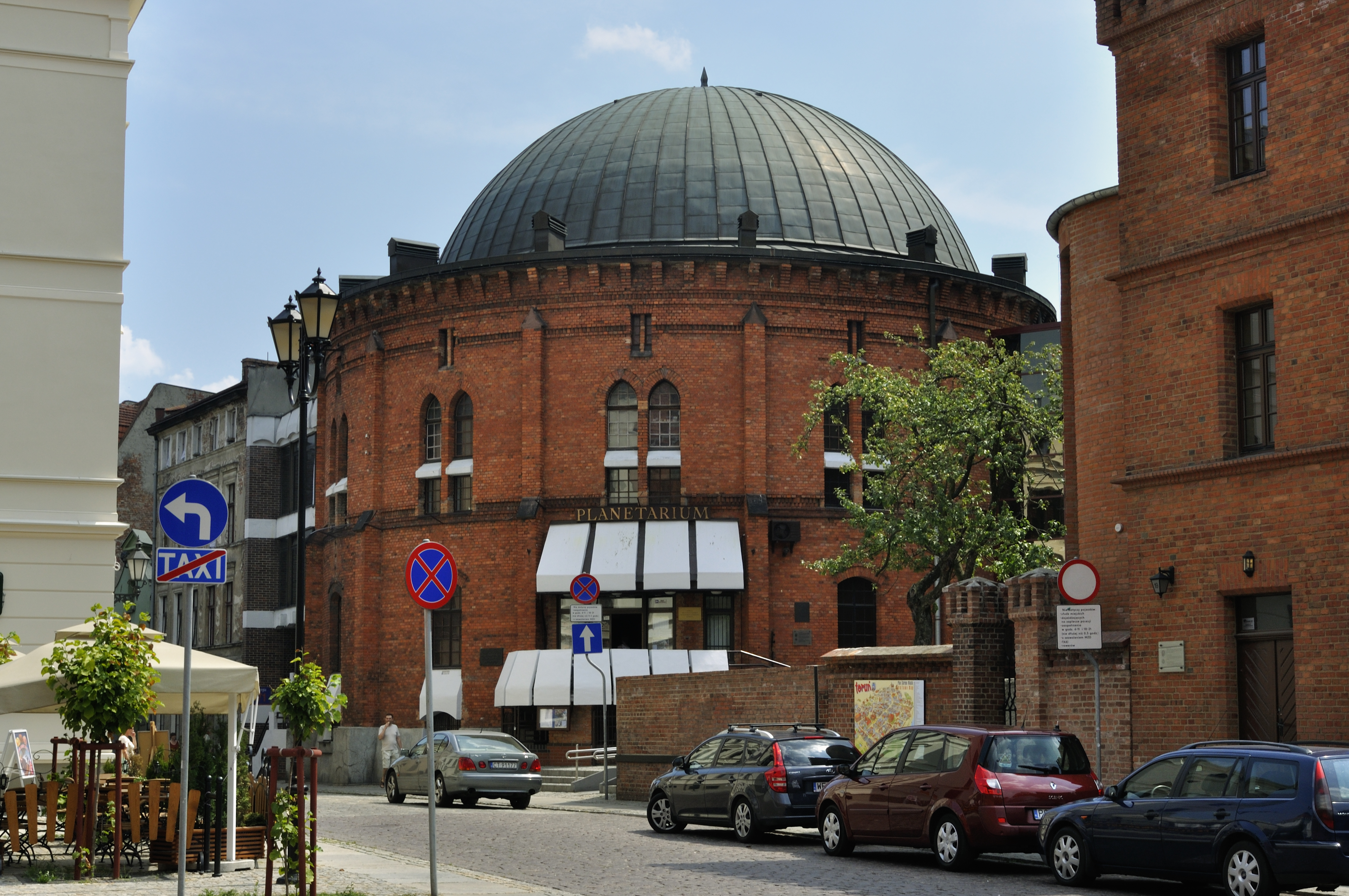
Toruń planetarium

The Tony Halik Travelers' Museum (Muzeum Podróżników im. Tony Halika) was established in 2003 after Elżbieta Dzikowska donated to citizens of Toruń a collection of objects from various countries and cultures following the death of her husband, famous explorer and writer, Toruń native, Tony Halik. It is managed by the District Museum in Toruń.

The Centre of Contemporary Art (Centrum Sztuki Współczesnej – CSW) opened in June 2008 and is one of the most important cultural facilities of this kind in Poland. The modern building is located in the very centre of the city, adjacent to the Old Town. The Toruń Symphonic Orchestra (formerly the Toruń Chamber Orchestra) is well-rooted in the Toruń cultural landscape.

Toruń is home to a planetarium (located downtown) and an astronomical observatory (located in nearby village of Piwnice). The latter boasts the largest radio telescope in Central Europe with a diameter of 32 m (104.99 ft), second only to the Effelsberg 100 m (328.08 ft) radio telescope.

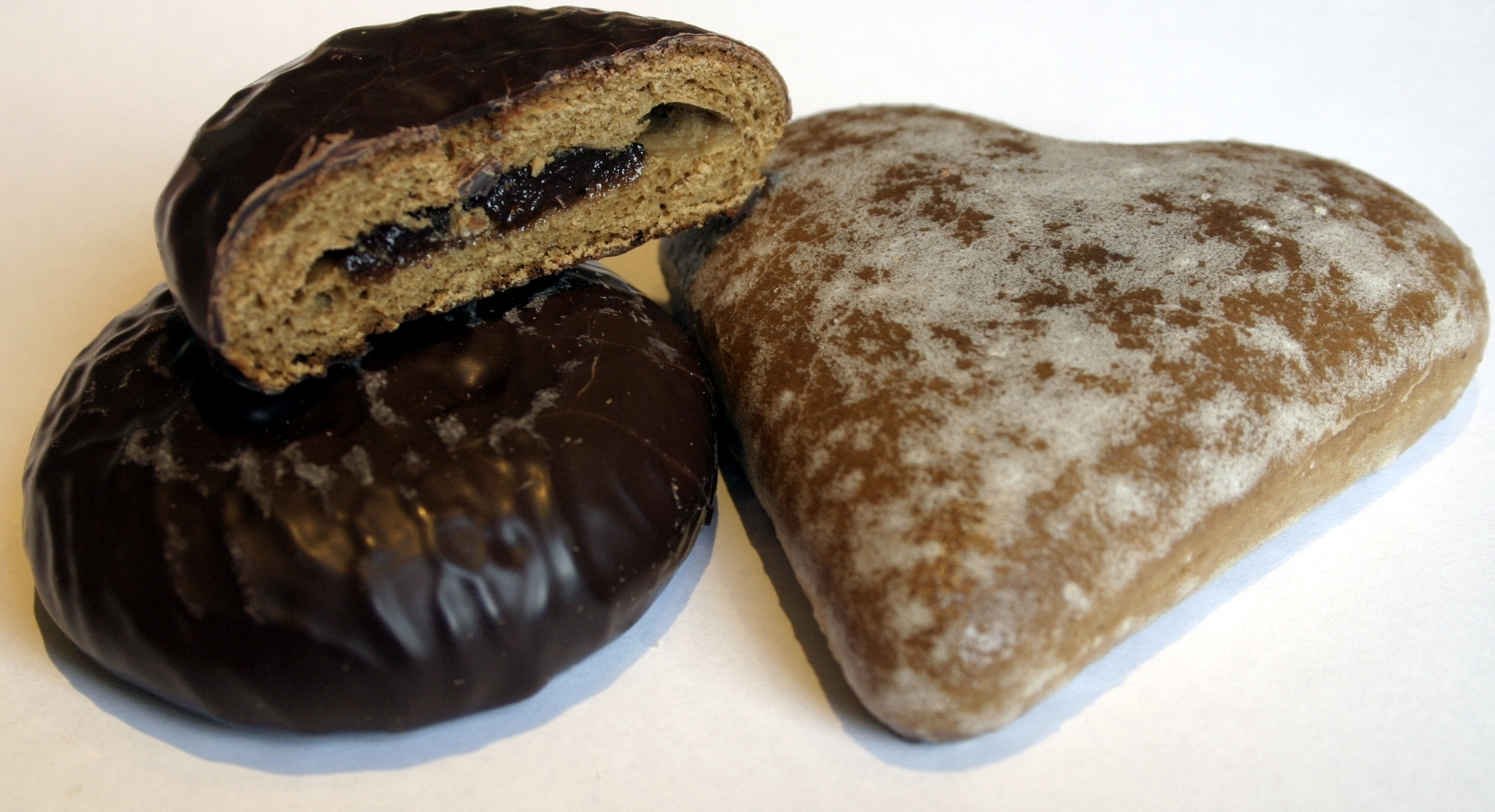
Toruń gingerbread

Toruń is well known for gingerbread, a type of piernik often made in elaborate molds. Museum of Toruń Gingerbread is a large museum dedicated to it. There are also several gingerbread workshops in the town that offer hands-on experiences for tourists, including the popular Living Museum of Gingerbread. The 15-year-old composer Fryderyk Chopin was smitten with Toruń gingerbread when he visited his godfather, Fryderyk Skarbek, there in the summer of 1825.

Toruń is a center of conservative Roman Catholic culture. Redemptorist Tadeusz Rydzyk set up Radio Maryja and Telewizja Trwam, a college where students can contribute to Radio Maryja. Now a museum is being constructed.

The 12999 Toruń asteroid is named after the city.

== Education ==
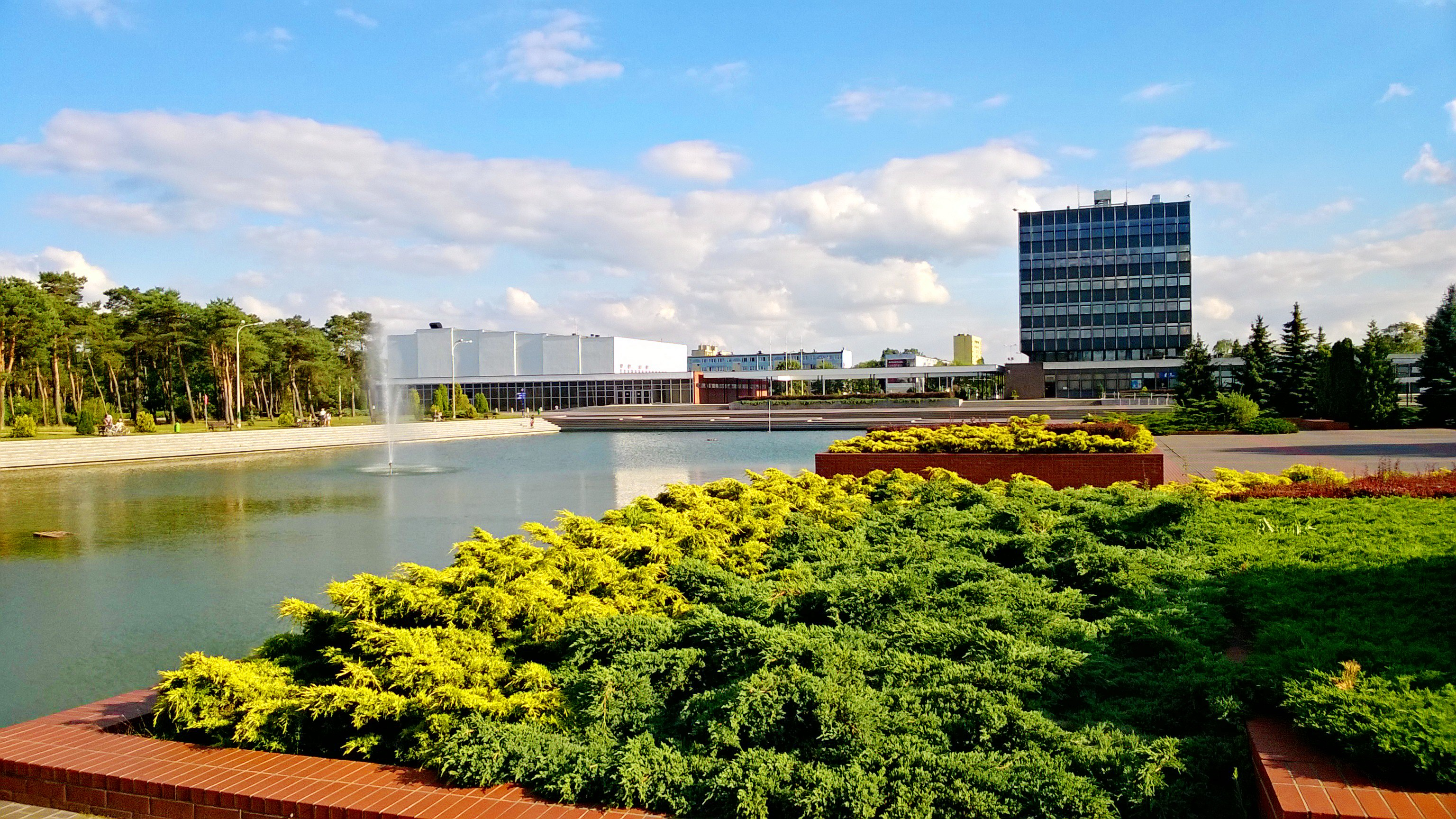
Miasteczko uniwersyteckie (University City)

Over 30 elementary and primary schools and over ten high schools make up the educational base of Toruń. Besides these, students can also attend a handful of private schools.

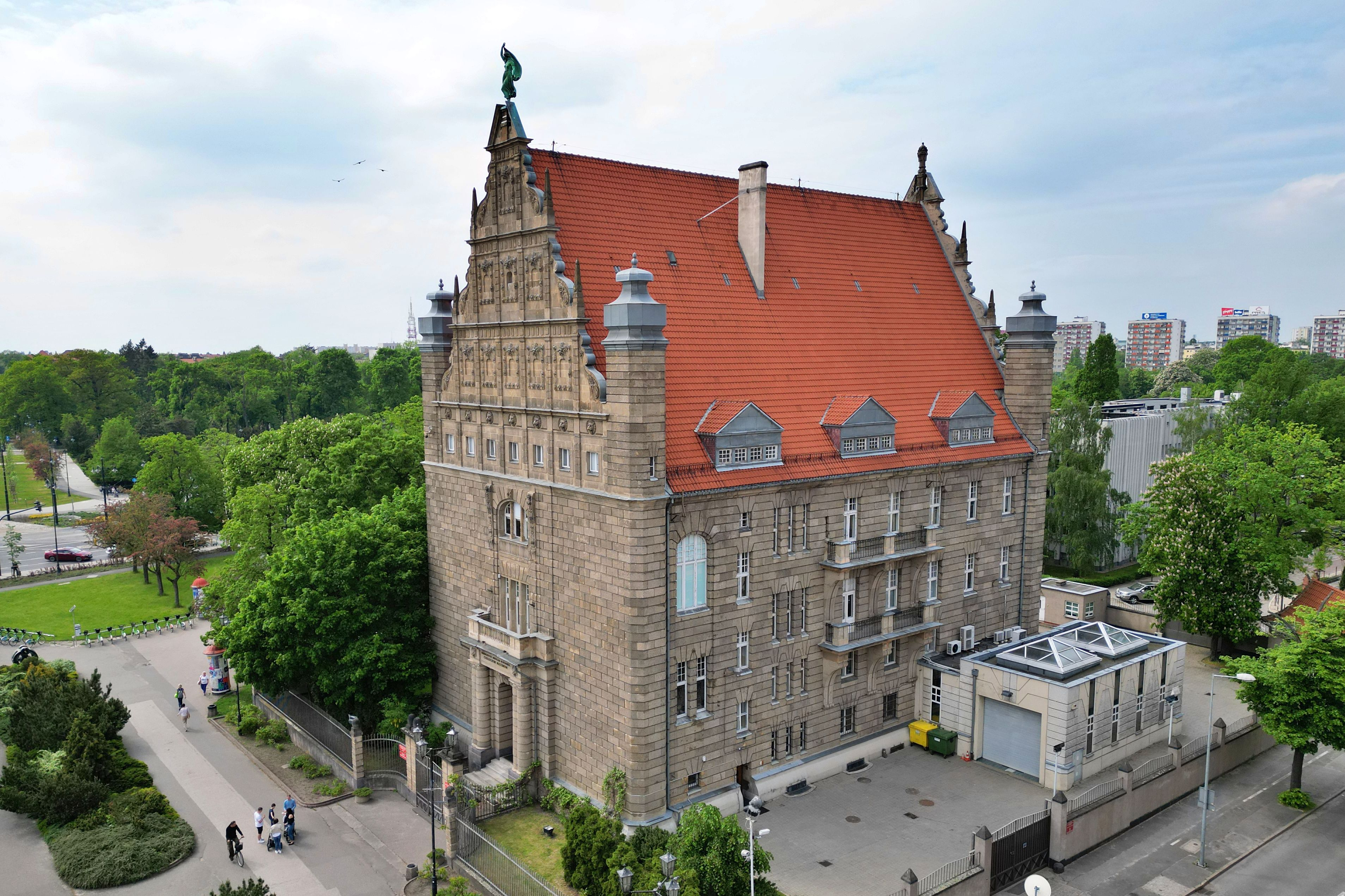
Collegium Maximum of the Nicolaus Copernicus University in Toruń

The largest institution of higher education in Toruń, Nicolaus Copernicus University in Toruń, serves over 20,000 students and was founded in 1945, based on the Toruń Scientific Society, Stefan Batory University in Wilno, and Jan Kazimierz University in Lwów. The existence of a high-ranked and high-profiled university with many students plays a role the city's position and importance in general, as well as in creating an image of Toruń's streets and clubs filled with crowds of young people. It also has a serious influence on local economy.

Other public institutions of higher education:

- Wyższe Seminarium Duchowne (a section of the Theological Faculty of the Nicolaus Copernicus University)
- The Teacher Training College – Nauczycielskie Kolegium Języków Obcych (affiliated to the Nicolaus Copernicus University)
- College of Fashion (Kolegium Mody)
- University of Warmia and Mazury in Olsztyn – Faculty of Geodesy and Land Management Department in Toruń
- College of Social Work – Kolegium Pracowników Służb Społecznych
- University of Gdańsk – College of Language

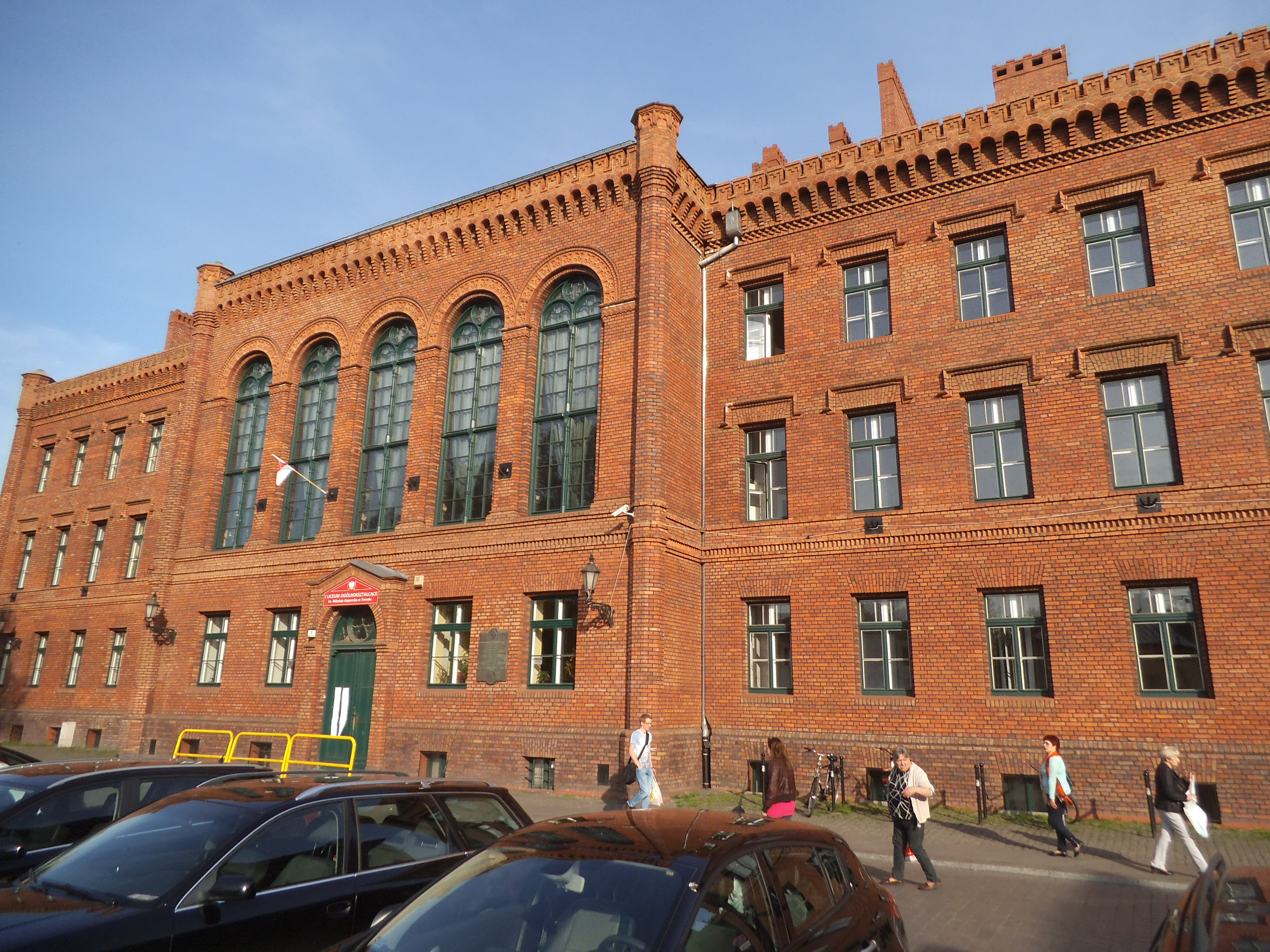
I Liceum Ogólnokształcące, one of the oldest high schools in Poland

There are also a number of private higher education facilities:

- WSB Merito Universities – WSB Merito University in Toruń
- The University of Social & Medial Culture in Toruń – Wyższa Szkoła Kultury Społecznej i Medialnej (affiliate to the Radio Maryja)
- Toruńska Szkoła Wyższa
- Wyższa Szkoła Filologii Hebrajskiej (Higher School of Hebrew Philology)
- Toruń School of Entrepreneurship – Toruńska Wyższa Szkoła Przedsiębiorczości

Also located in Toruń is one of the oldest high schools in Poland, I Liceum Ogólnokształcące im. Mikołaja Kopernika, which dates back to a gymnasium founded in 1568.

== Healthcare ==
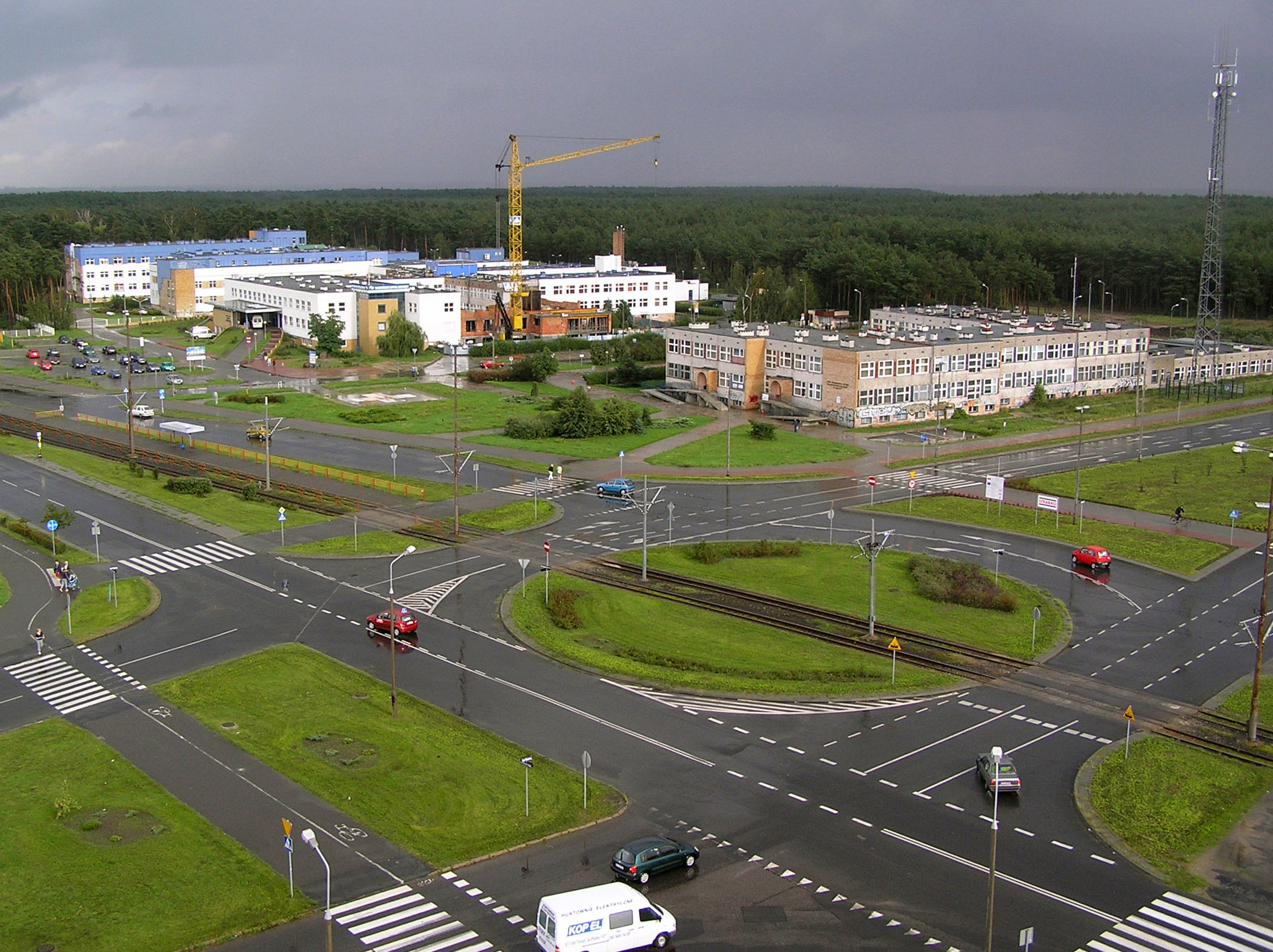
Municipal children's hospital

Six hospitals of various specializations provide medical service for Toruń itself, its surrounding area, and to the region in general. The largest hospital in Toruń is the Ludwik Rydygier hospital, which consists of multiple units located across the city. In addition, there are a number of other healthcare facilities in the city.

== Media ==
- Press
  - Daily newspapers: Nasz Dziennik, Rzeczpospolita, Gazeta Wyborcza Toruń, Gazeta Pomorska, Nowości, Metro
  - Weekly magazines: Niedziela, City Toruń, Teraz Toruń
  - Other: Undergrunt, Immuniet, Ilustrator, Poza Toruń
- Radio stations:
  - Polskie Radio Pomorza i Kujaw,
  - Radio ESKA – which plays international hits, along with Polish music
  - Radio GRA
  - Radio ZET Gold
  - Radio Sfera
  - Radio WAWA
  - RMF FM
  - Radio Maryja – a radio station that broadcasts religious observances such as mass and prayer in Polish
- TV stations:
  - TVN/TVN24 – regional office
  - TVP Info – Oddział w Bydgoszczy, Redakcja Terenowa w Toruniu,
  - Telewizja Trwam
  - Podróże TV
  - Telewizja Kablowa Toruń
  - Telewizja TAT Studio Region
  - Telewizja Petrus

== Sports ==
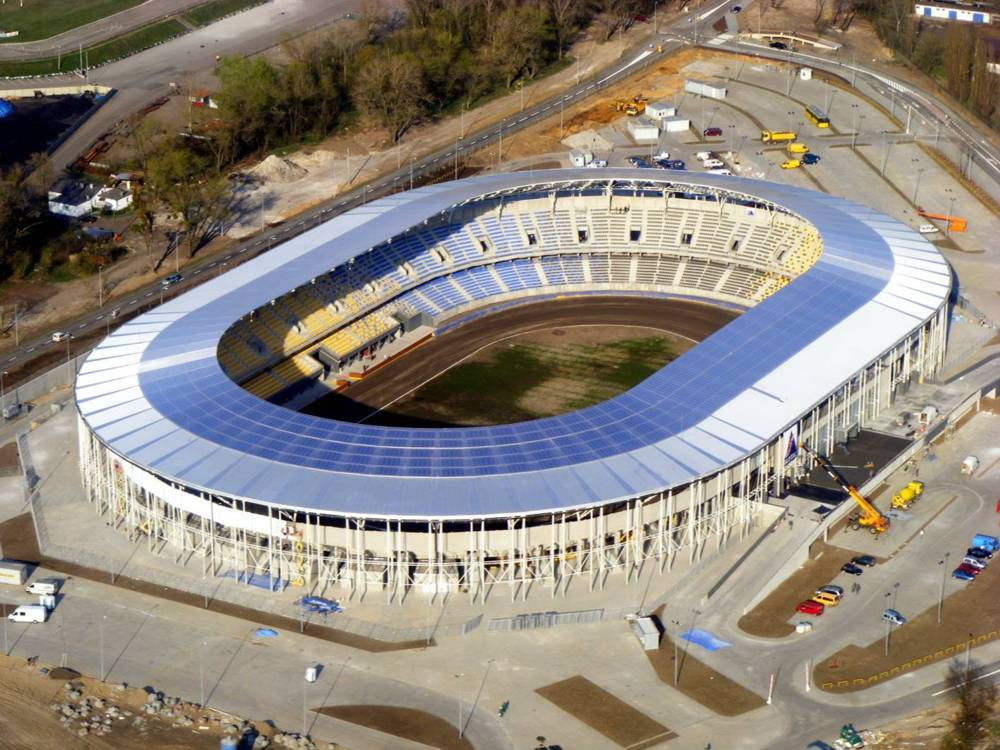
Toruń's MotoArena is one of world's newest speedway stadia and the host of the Speedway Grand Prix of Poland

Professional sports teams
Club	Sport	League	Trophies
KS Toruń	Speedway	Ekstraliga	4 Polish Championships
KS Toruń HSA	Ice hockey	Polska Hokej Liga	1 Polish Cup (2005)
Twarde Pierniki Toruń	Men's basketball	Polish Basketball League	1 Polish Cup (2018)
Katarzynki Toruń	Women's basketball	Basket Liga Kobiet	0
Pomorzanin Toruń	Men's field hockey	Superliga	3 Polish Championships
Anioły Toruń	Men's volleyball	II liga	0
Elana Toruń	Men's football	III liga	0
Pomorzanin Toruń	Men's football	IV liga	0
FC Toruń	Men's futsal	Ekstraklasa	0

Other clubs:

- Angels Toruń – American football – Polish American Football League First Division
- Nestle-Pacyfic – cycling
- Toruński Klub Bowlingowy – bowling
- Budowlani Toruń – volleyball (women premier league in Poland), whose home ground is the Arena Toruń
- UKS Budowlanka Toruń – volleyball
- Toruński KS – defunct Polish football club, co-founders of the Polish football league
- The E11 European long distance path for hikers passes through Toruń

== Notable people ==
Notable residents of Toruń include:

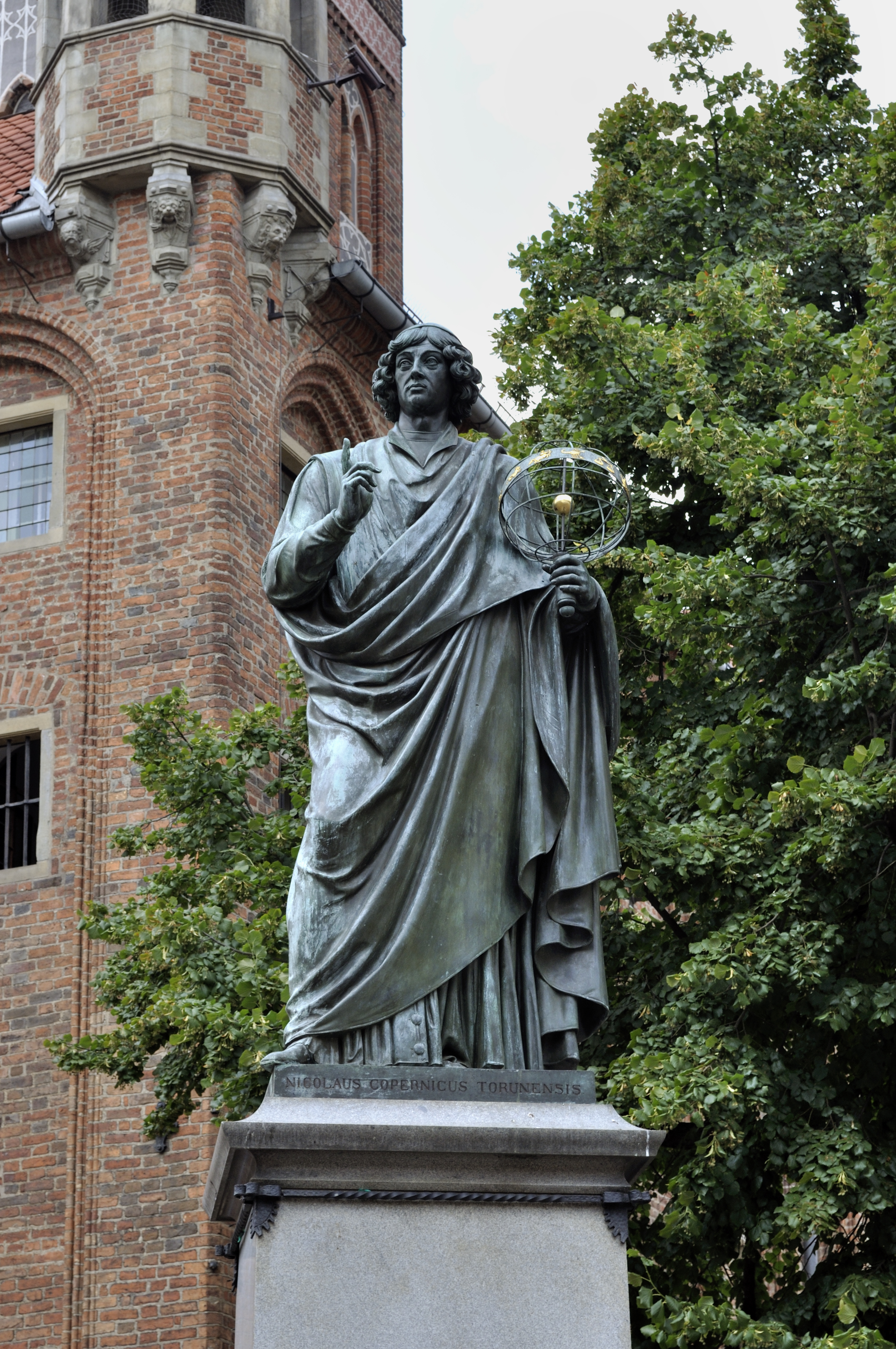
Nicolaus Copernicus Monument at the Old Market Square (Rynek Staromiejski)

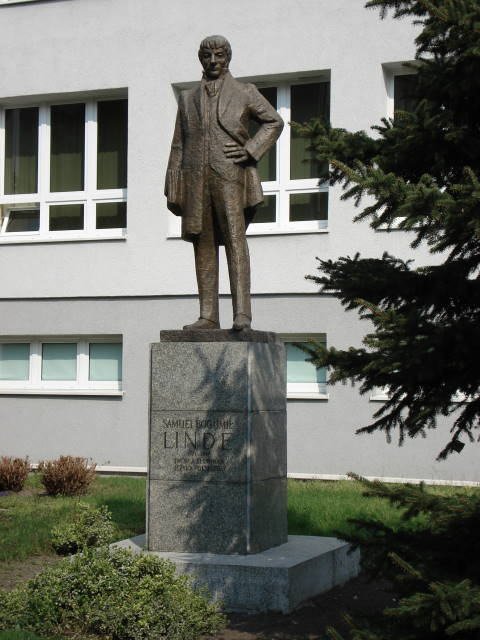
Samuel Linde Monument

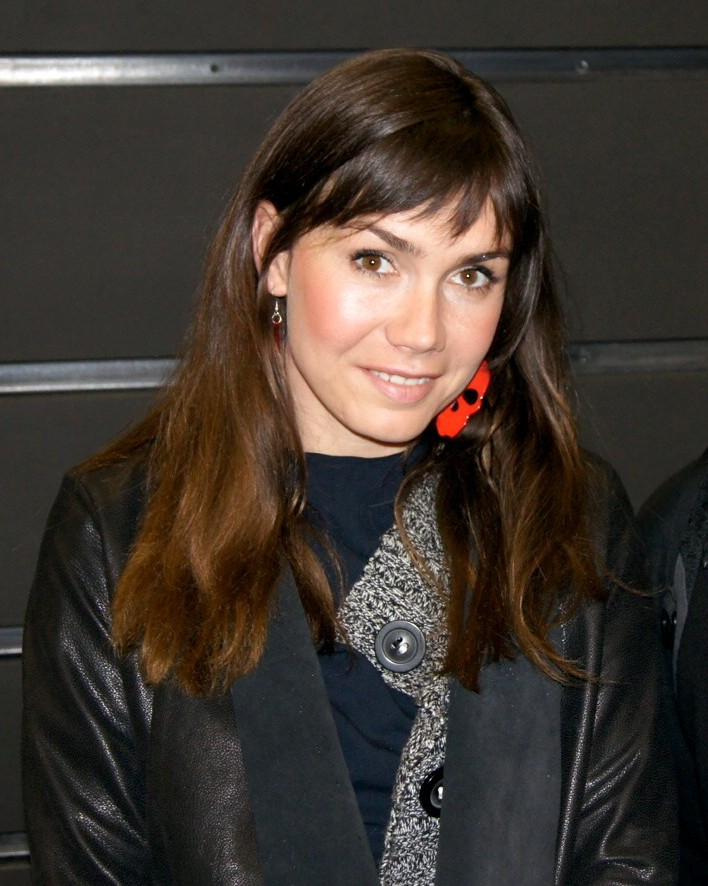
Olga Bołądź

- Filippo Buonaccorsi (1437–1496), Italian humanist, writer, and diplomat
- Nicolaus Copernicus (1473–1543), Renaissance polymath and astronomer
- Anna Vasa of Sweden (1568–1625), Polish and Swedish princess
- Bartholomeus Strobel (1591–1650), Baroque painter
- Samuel Thomas von Sömmerring (1755–1830), German physician and anatomist
- Samuel Linde (1771–1847), linguist, librarian, and lexicographer of the Polish language
- Fryderyk Skarbek (1792–1866), economist, novelist, historian, social activist, administrator, politician, and penologist
- Zvi Hirsch Kalischer (1795–1874), rabbi
- Frédéric Chopin (1810–1849), composer and virtuoso pianist of the Romantic period
- Agathe Plitt (1831-1902), composer
- Salomon Kalischer (1845–1924), German composer, pianist, and physicist
- Hartwig Hirschfeld (1854–1934), British Orientalist, bibliographer, and educator
- Moritz Baerwald (1860–1919), German lawyer and politician
- Julie Wolfthorn (1864–1944), German painter, killed in the Theresienstadt concentration camp
- Berthold Oppenheim (1867–1942), rabbi murdered in the Treblinka extermination camp
- Władysław Dziewulski (1878–1962), astronomer and mathematician
- Henryk Kuna (c.1885–1945), sculptor
- Hermann Rauschning (1887–1982), German conservative reactionary politician and author
- Karl Böttcher (1889–1973), Nazi German general who received the Knight's Cross of the Iron Cross of Nazi Germany
- Paul Hinkler (1892–1945), prominent member of the Nazi Party, high-ranking Nazi police official
- Roman Ingarden (1893–1970), philosopher
- Kurt Chill (1895–1976), Nazi German general who received the Knight's Cross of the Iron Cross of Nazi Germany
- Lotte Jacobi (1896–1990), American portrait photographer and photojournalist
- Arthur Finger (1898–1945), Nazi German general who received the Knight's Cross of the Iron Cross of Nazi Germany
- Elżbieta Zawacka (1909–2009), university professor, scouting instructor, SOE agent, and a freedom fighter during World War II
- Hans Walter Zech‐Nenntwich (1916–after 1964), member of the SS at the Mauthausen concentration camp, convicted of mass killings of 5,200 Jews while with the SS Cavalry Brigade
- Rudy Sternberg, Baron Plurenden (1917–1978), British industrialist and farmer
- Tony Halik (1921–1998), film operator, documentary filmmaker, travel writer, traveller, explorer, and polyglot
- Kazimierz Serocki (1922–1981), composer
- Sigmund Sobolewski (1923–2017), Catholic Holocaust survivor, opponent of Holocaust denial
- Aleksander Wolszczan (born 1946), astronomer
- Bogusław Linda (born 1952), actor
- Michał Zaleski (born 1952), politician
- Jadwiga Rappé (born 1952), operatic contralto
- Waldemar Fydrych (born 1953), Polish activist, leader of the Orange Alternative movement
- Jerzy Wenderlich (born 1954), politician
- Joanna Scheuring-Wielgus (born 1972), politician
- Piotr Głowacki (born 1980), actor
- Tomasz Wasilewski (born 1980), film director and screenwriter
- Olga Bołądź (born 1984), actress
- Adrian Kubicki (born 1987), Consul General of the Republic of Poland in New York City
- Sławomir Mentzen (born 1986) Leader of Polish right wing political party Confederation Liberty and Independence

=== Sport ===
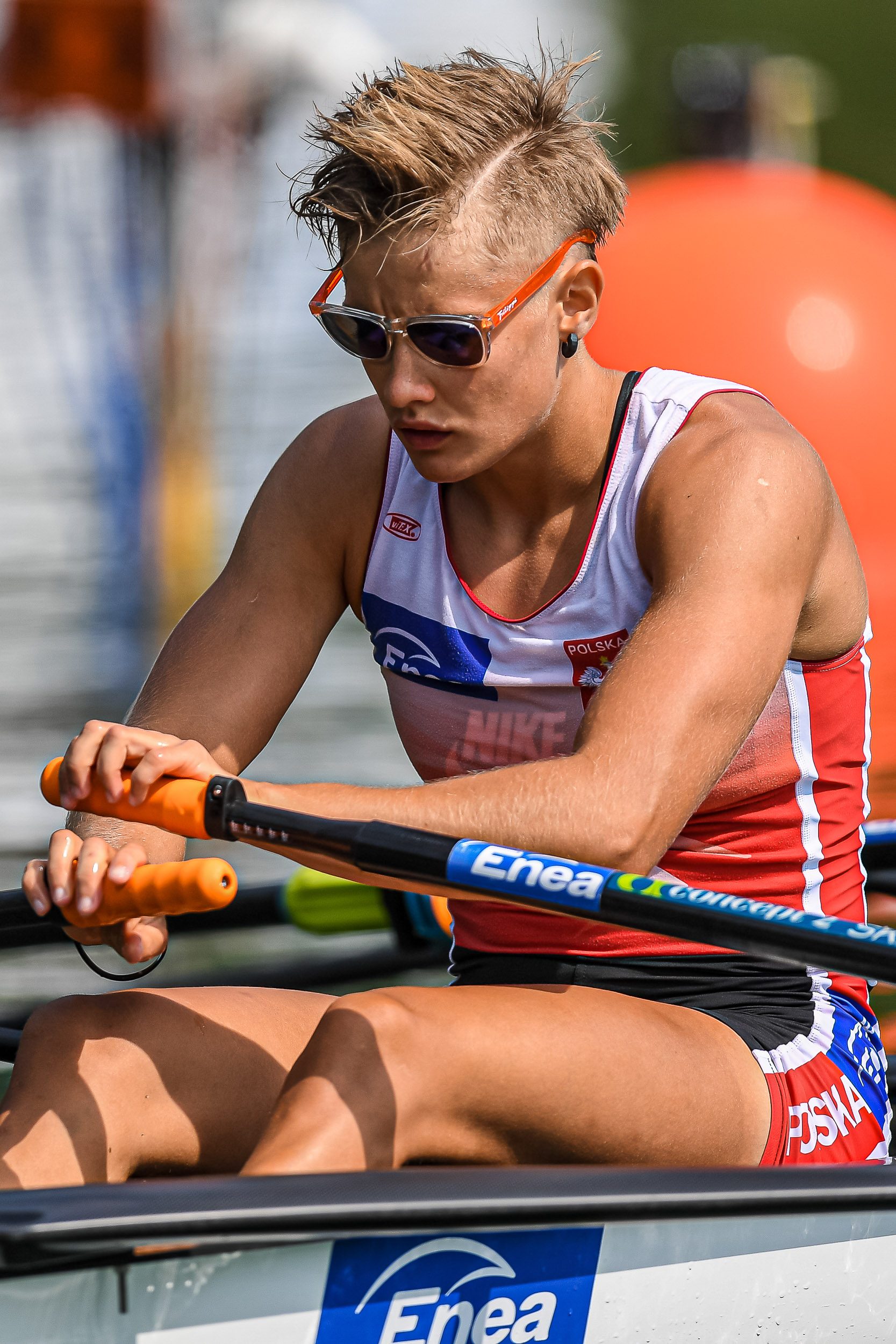
Katarzyna Zillmann

- Bodo Tümmler (born 1943), German Olympic middle-distance runner
- Piotr Bojanczyk (born 1946), Ice Dancer
- Teresa Weyna (born 1950), ice dancer
- Tomasz Warczachowski (born 1974), footballer
- Michał Gołaś (born 1984), road bicycle racer
- Adam Waczyński (born 1989), basketball player
- Michał Kwiatkowski (born 1990), road bicycle racer
- Hanna Łyczbińska (born 1990), Olympic fencer
- Martyna Jelińska (born 1992), Olympic fencer
- Katarzyna Zillmann (born 1995), Olympic rower
- Jakub Piotrowski (born 1997), footballer

== International relations ==
Honouring Toruń's sister relationship with Philadelphia, Pennsylvania, the Bulwar Filadelfijski (Philadelphia Boulevard), a 2 km (1.2 mi) long street running mostly between Vistula River and walls of the Old Town and the boulevard itself, bears its name. The Ślimak Getyński is one of the lanes connecting Piłsudski Bridge / John Paul II Avenue with Philadelphia Boulevard at their downtown interchange. It honours the relationship with Göttingen, its name derived from the street's half-circular shape (Polish word ślimak meaning "snail").

=== Twin towns – Sister cities ===
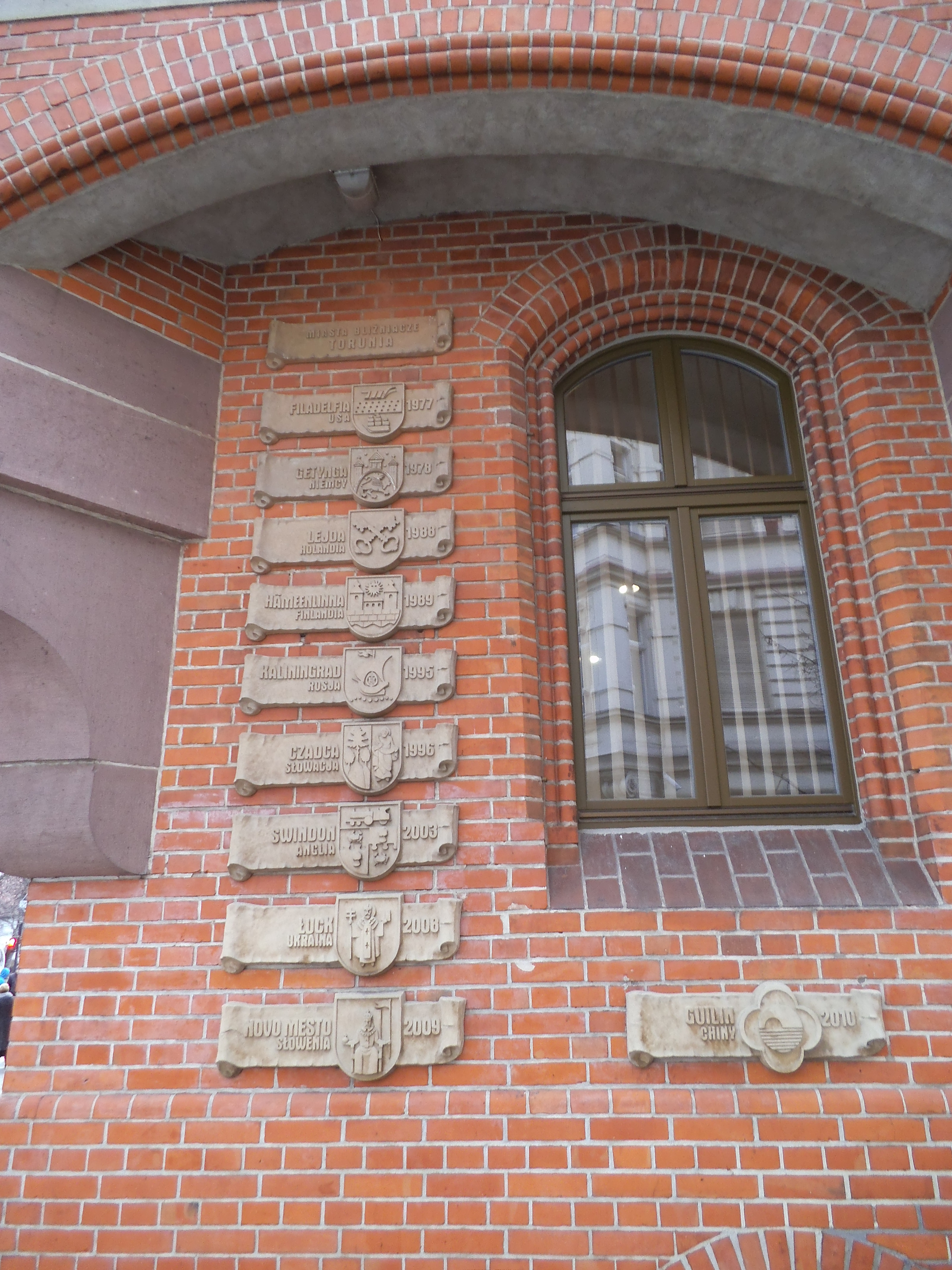
Toruń's twin cities

Toruń is twinned with:

Philadelphia, Pennsylvania, United States, since 1977; Göttingen, Lower Saxony, Germany, since 1978; Leiden, South Holland, Netherlands, since 1988; Hämeenlinna, Finland, since 1989	Čadca, Slovakia, since 1996; Swindon, Wiltshire, United Kingdom, since 2003; Novo Mesto, Slovenia, since 2005; Lutsk, Ukraine, since 2008; Guilin, China, since 2010

Former twin towns:

- Kaliningrad, Russia (since 1995 until 2022, terminated due to the Russian invasion of Ukraine)

== Gallery ==
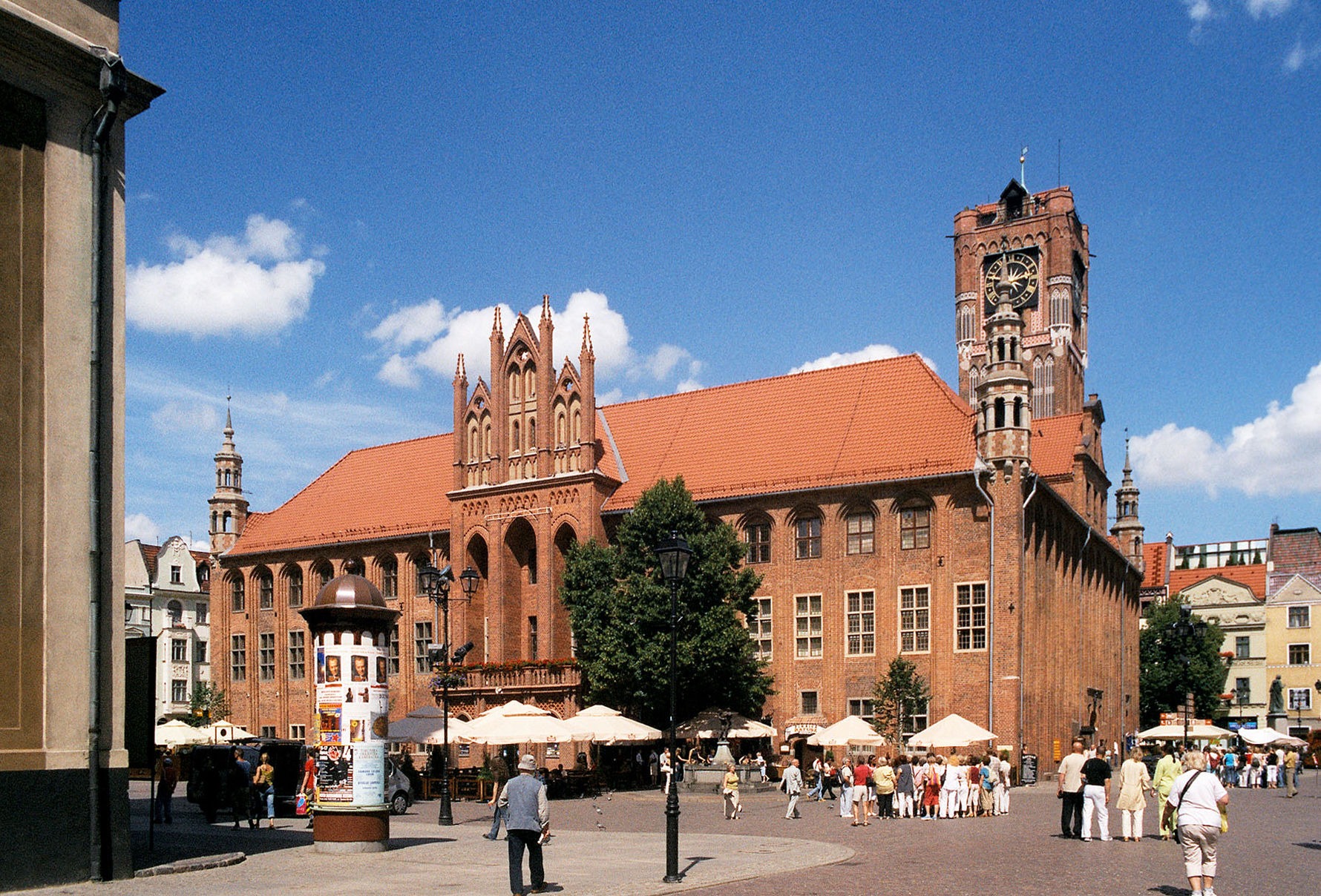
Old Town Hall

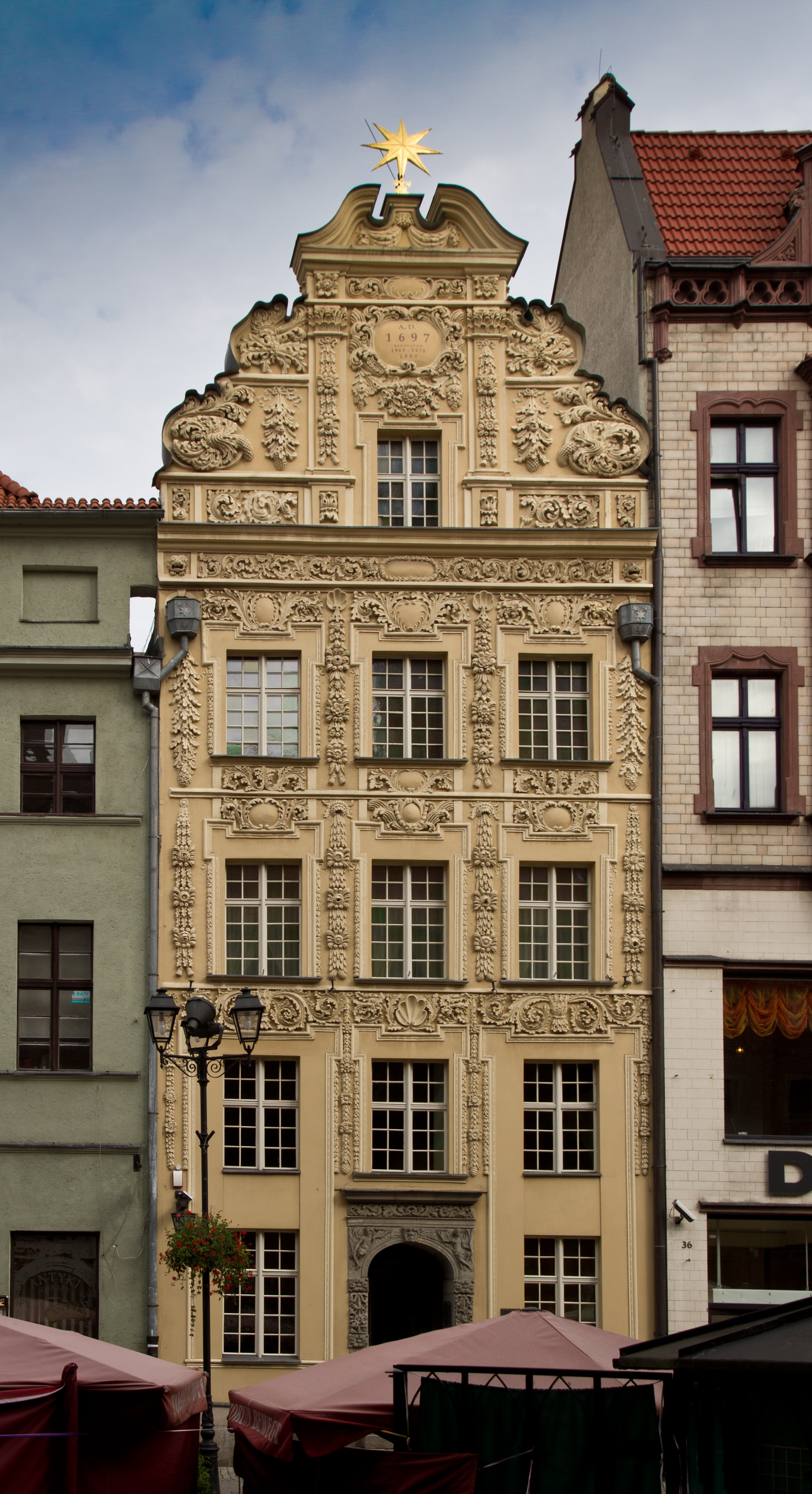
House Under the Star

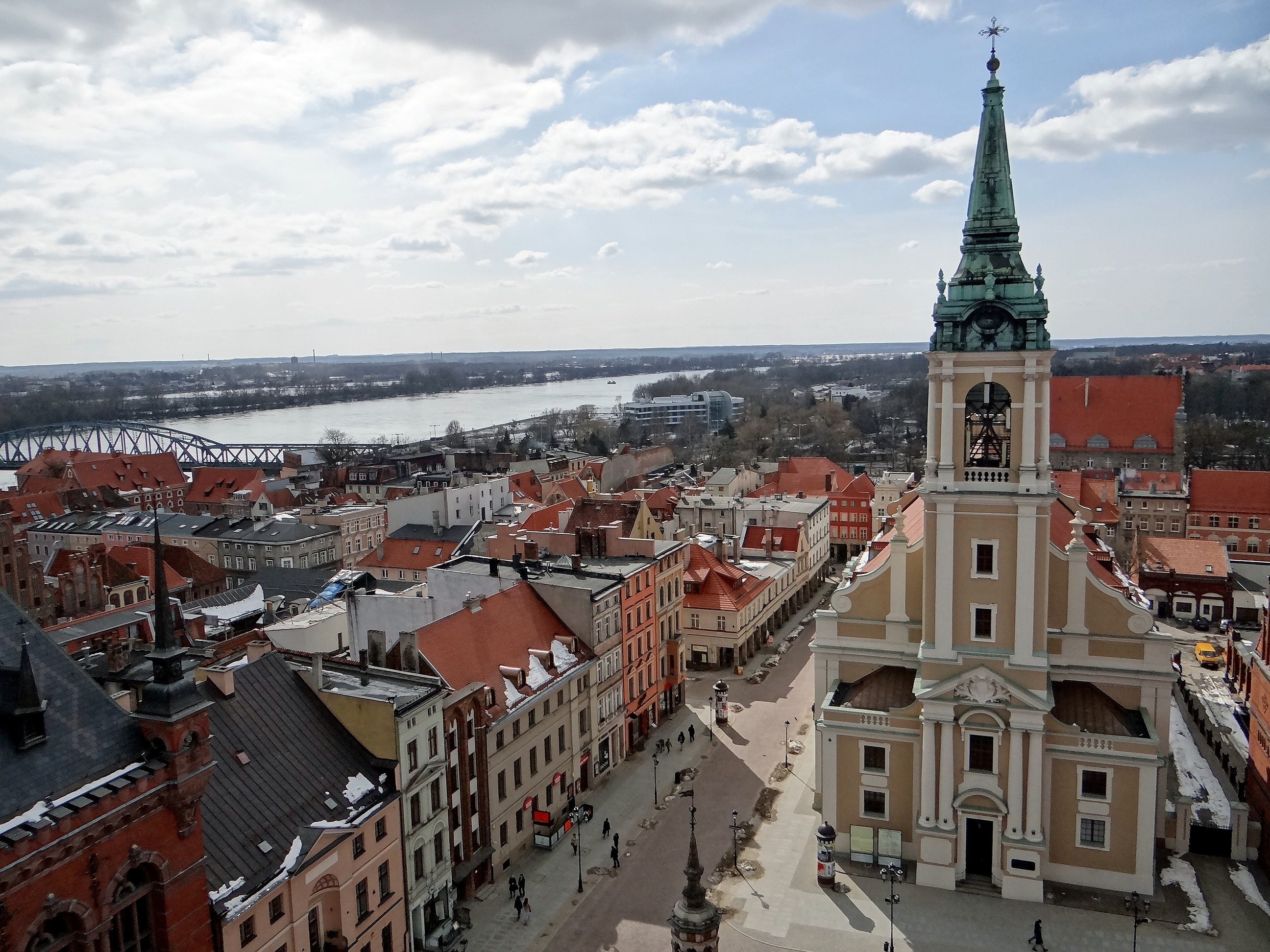
Holy Spirit Church

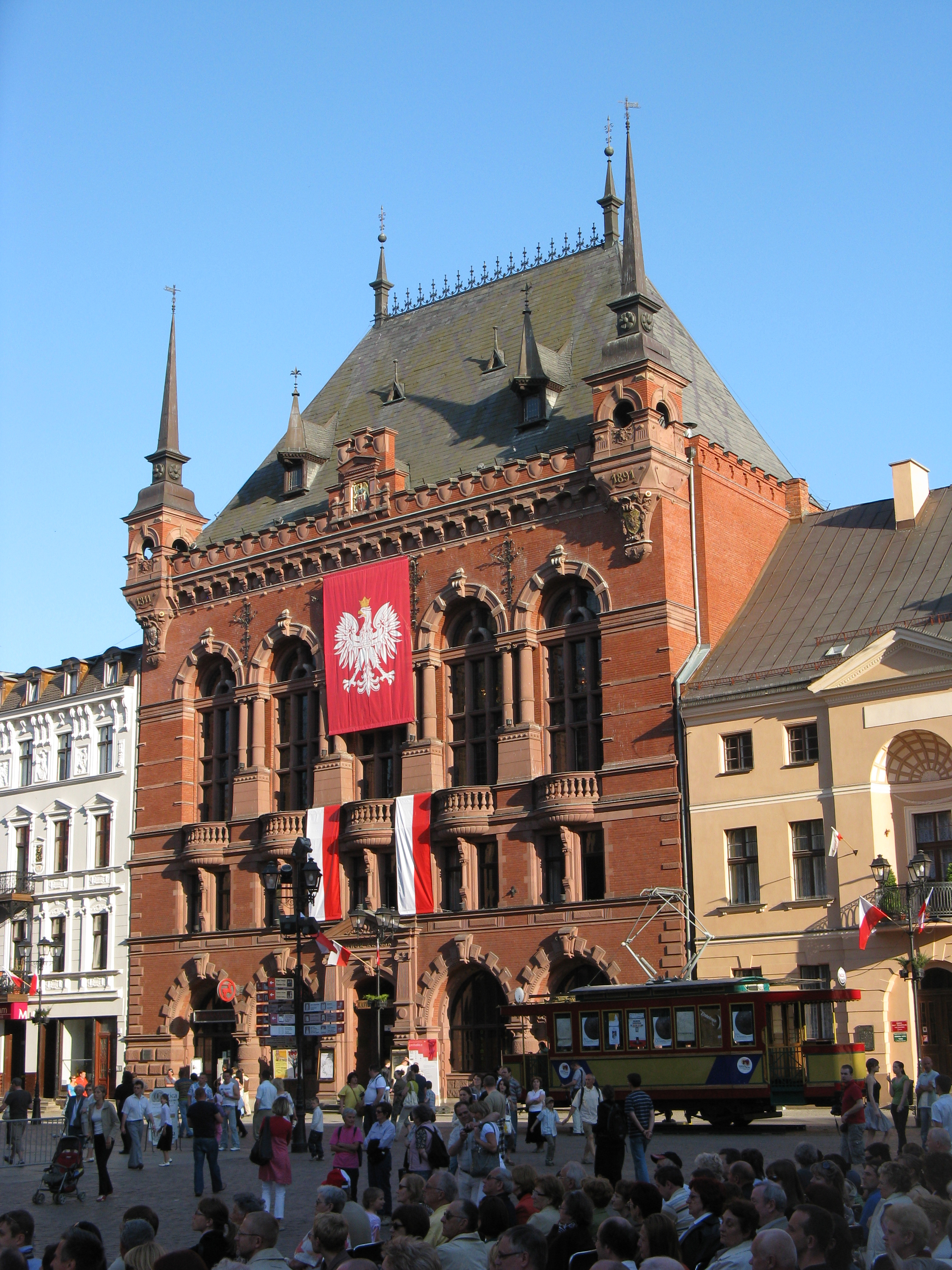
Artus Court

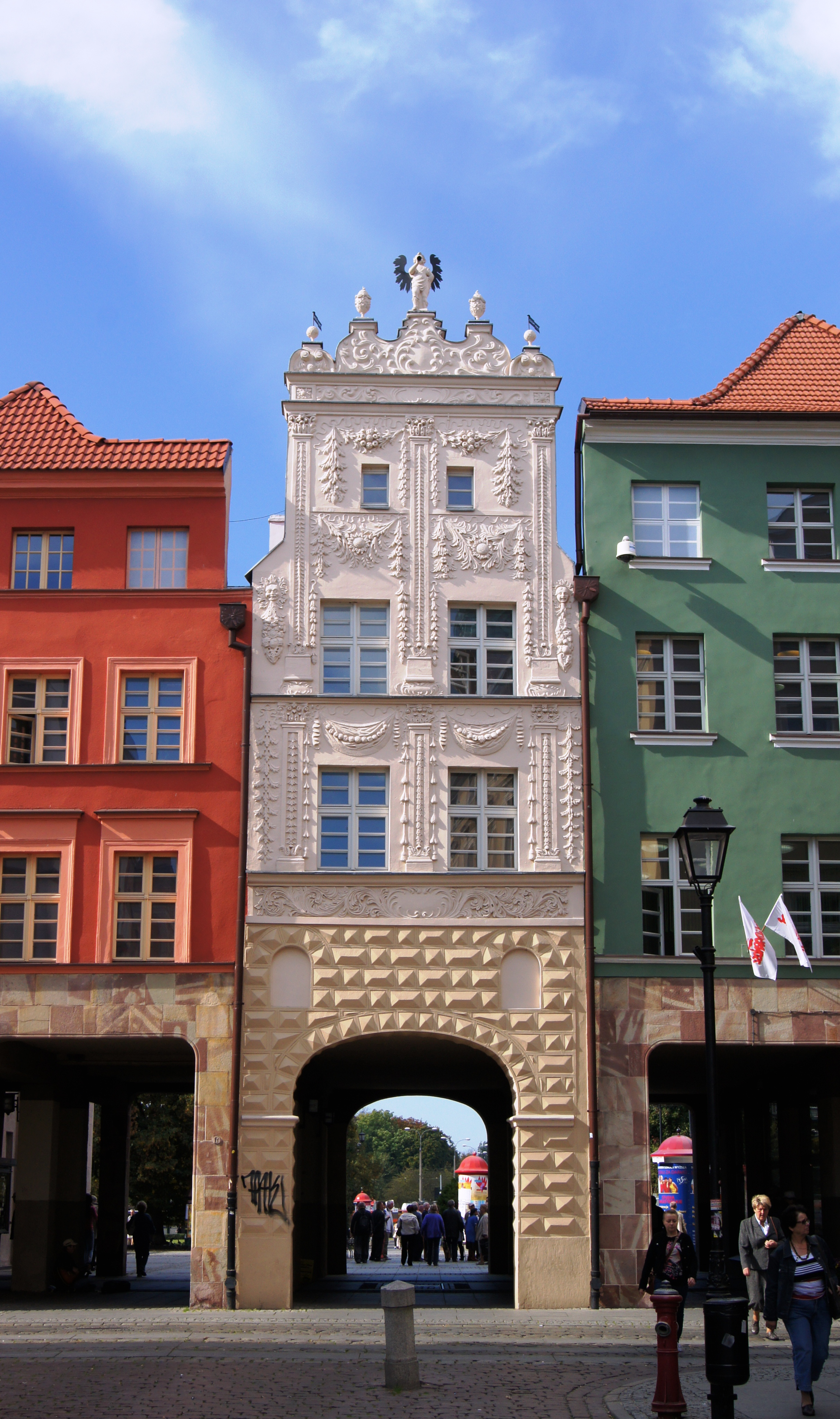
Caesar's Arch Tenement House

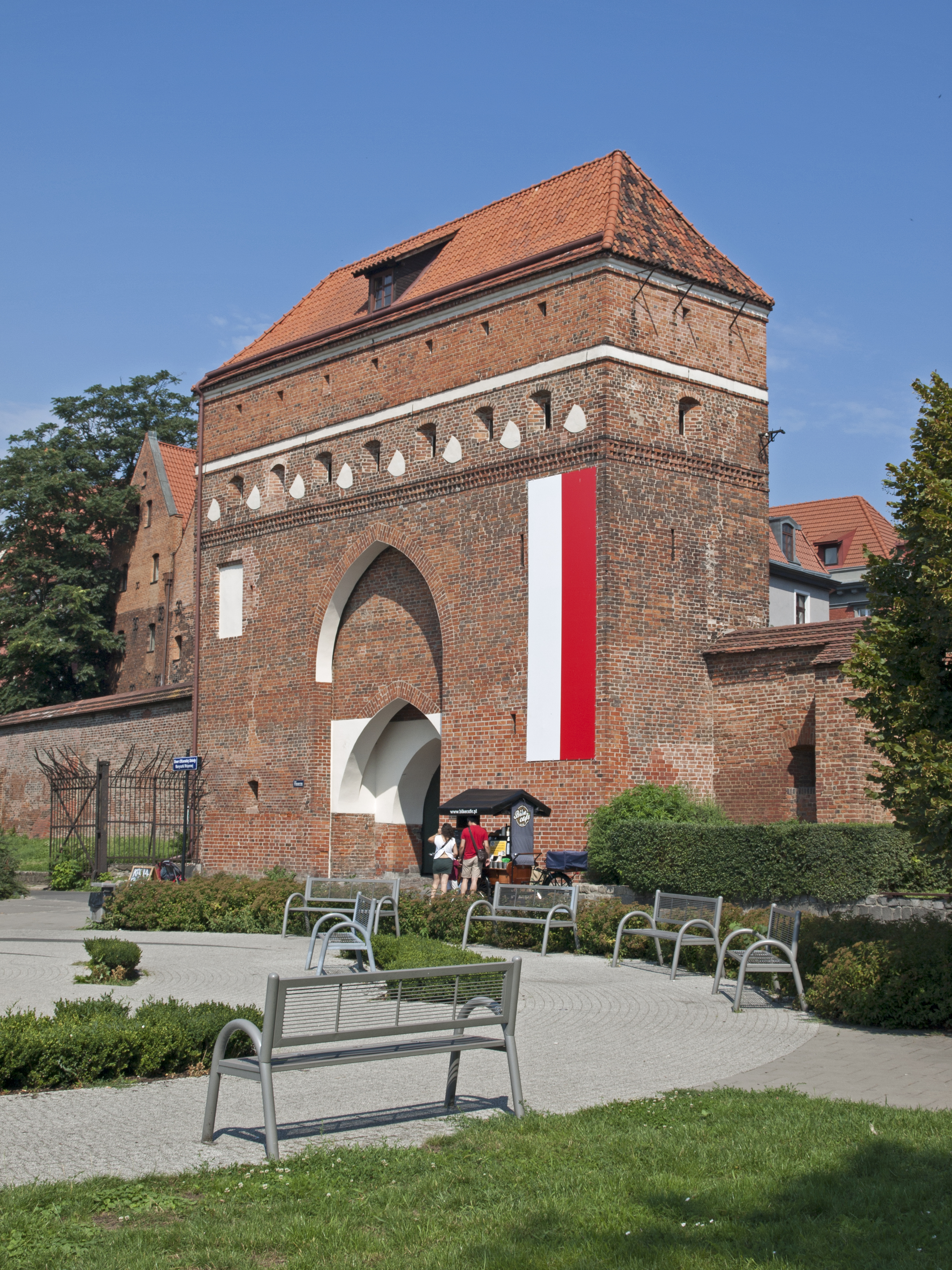
Brama Klasztorna (Convent Gate)

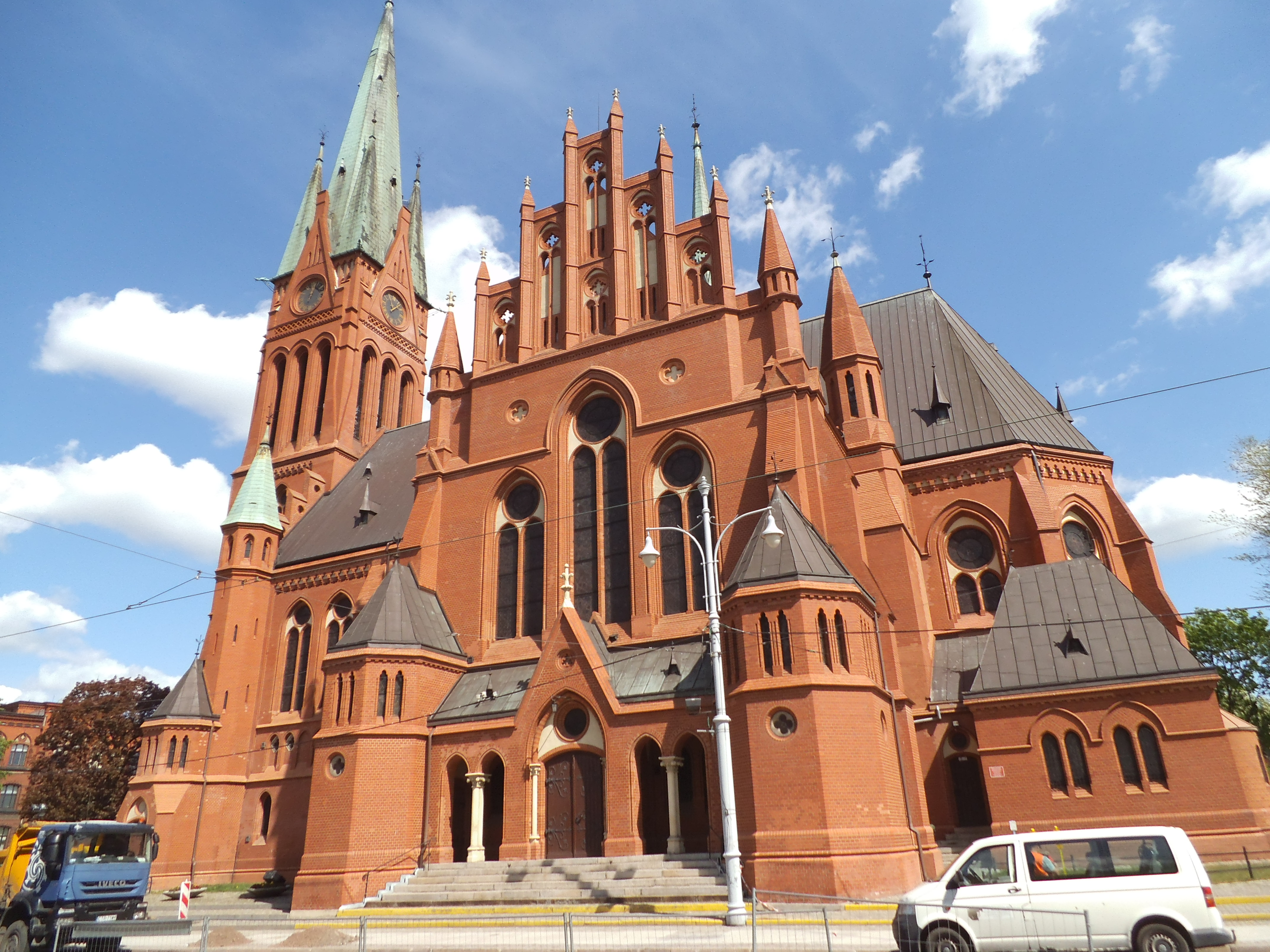
Saint Catherine of Alexandria church

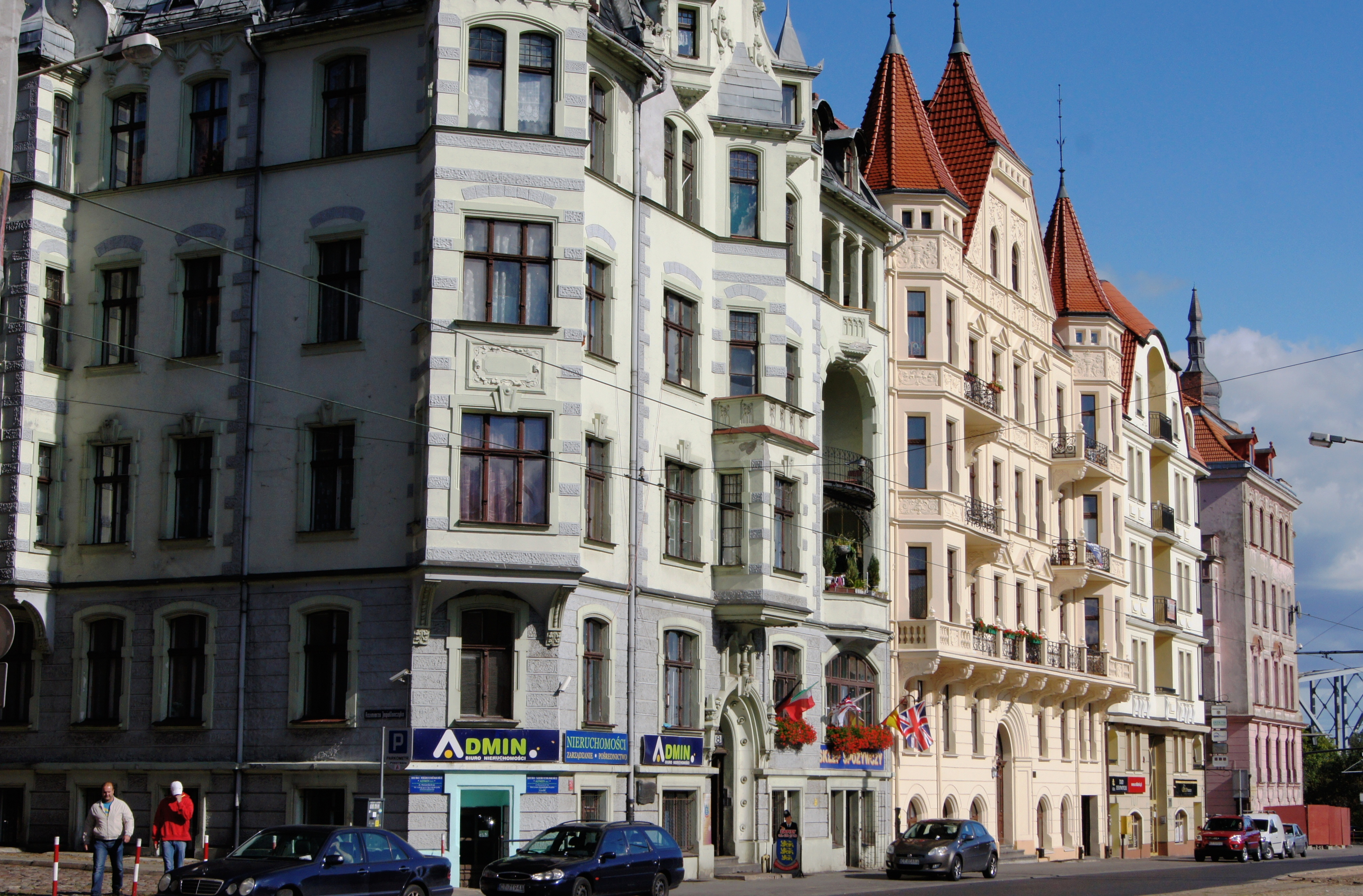
Historic tenement houses along Warszawska Street

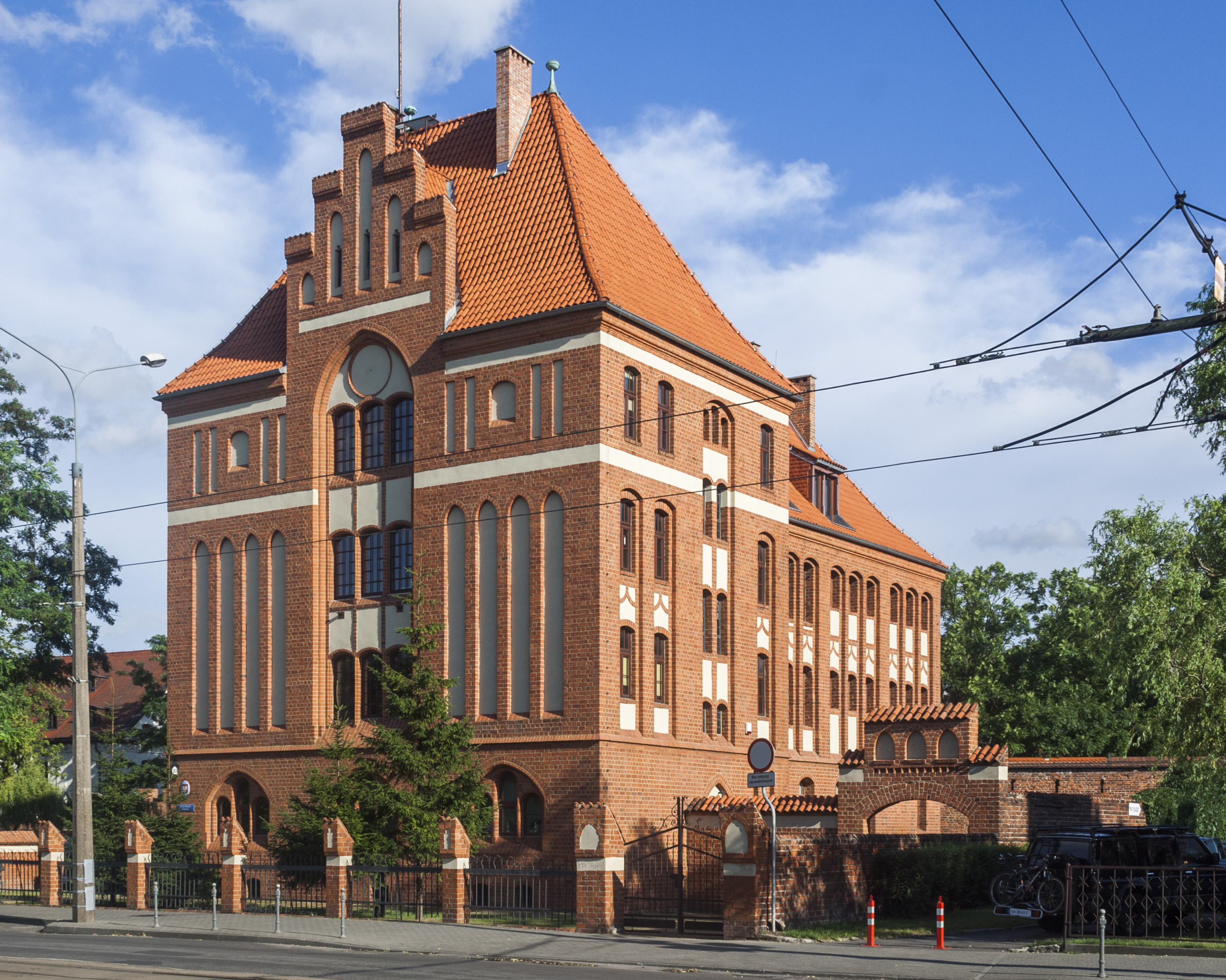
Former Police Station Building

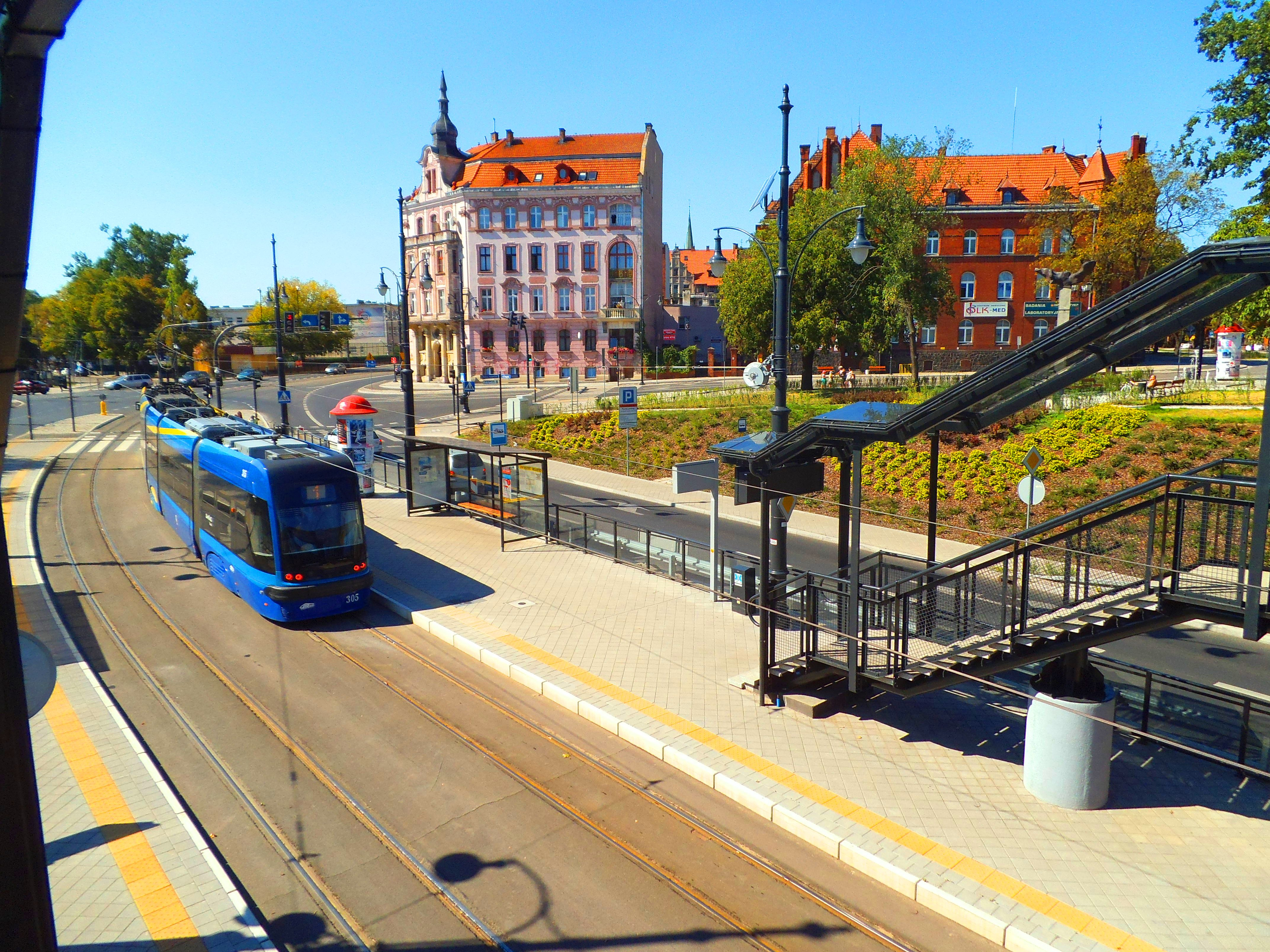
City tram line

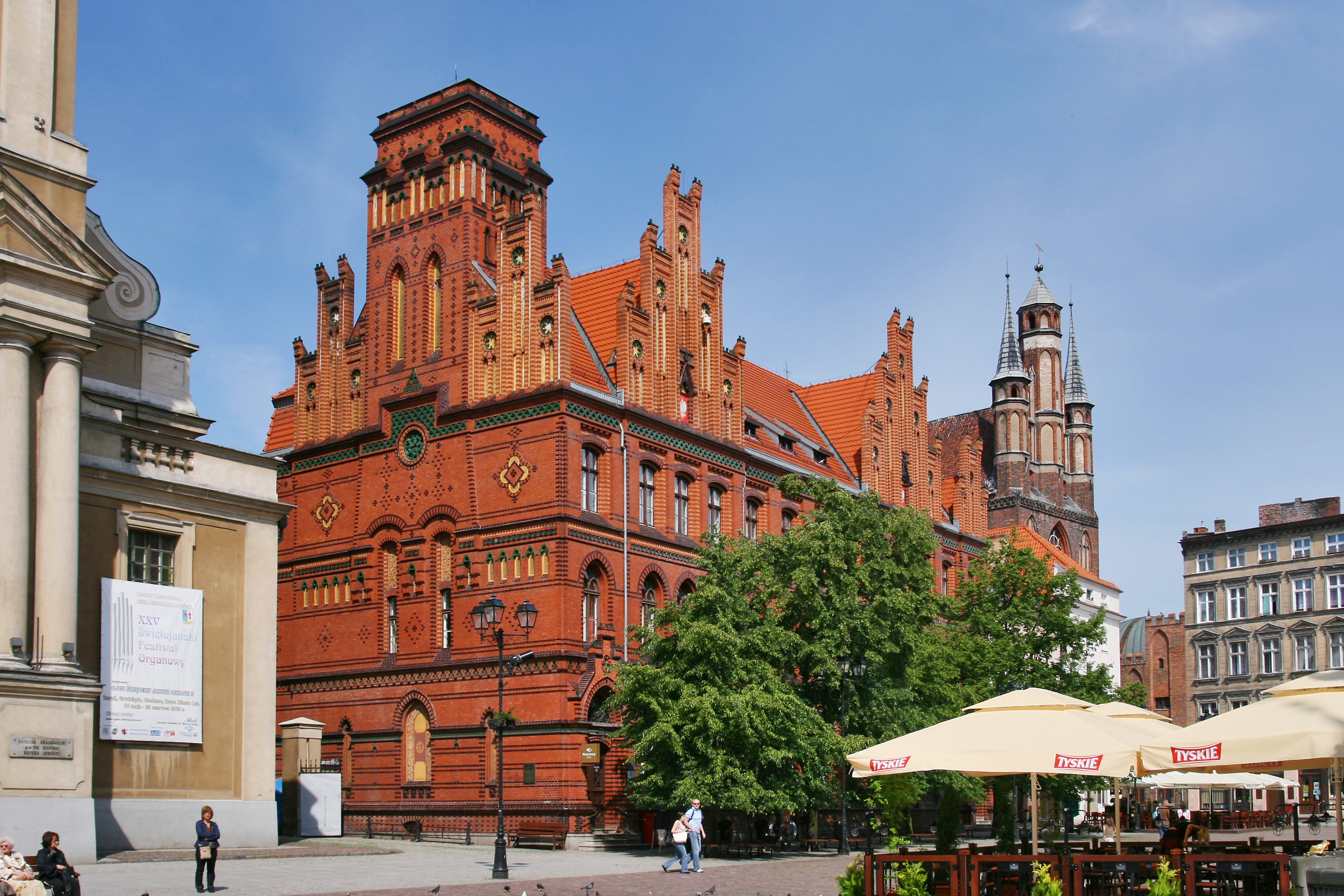
Main Post Office

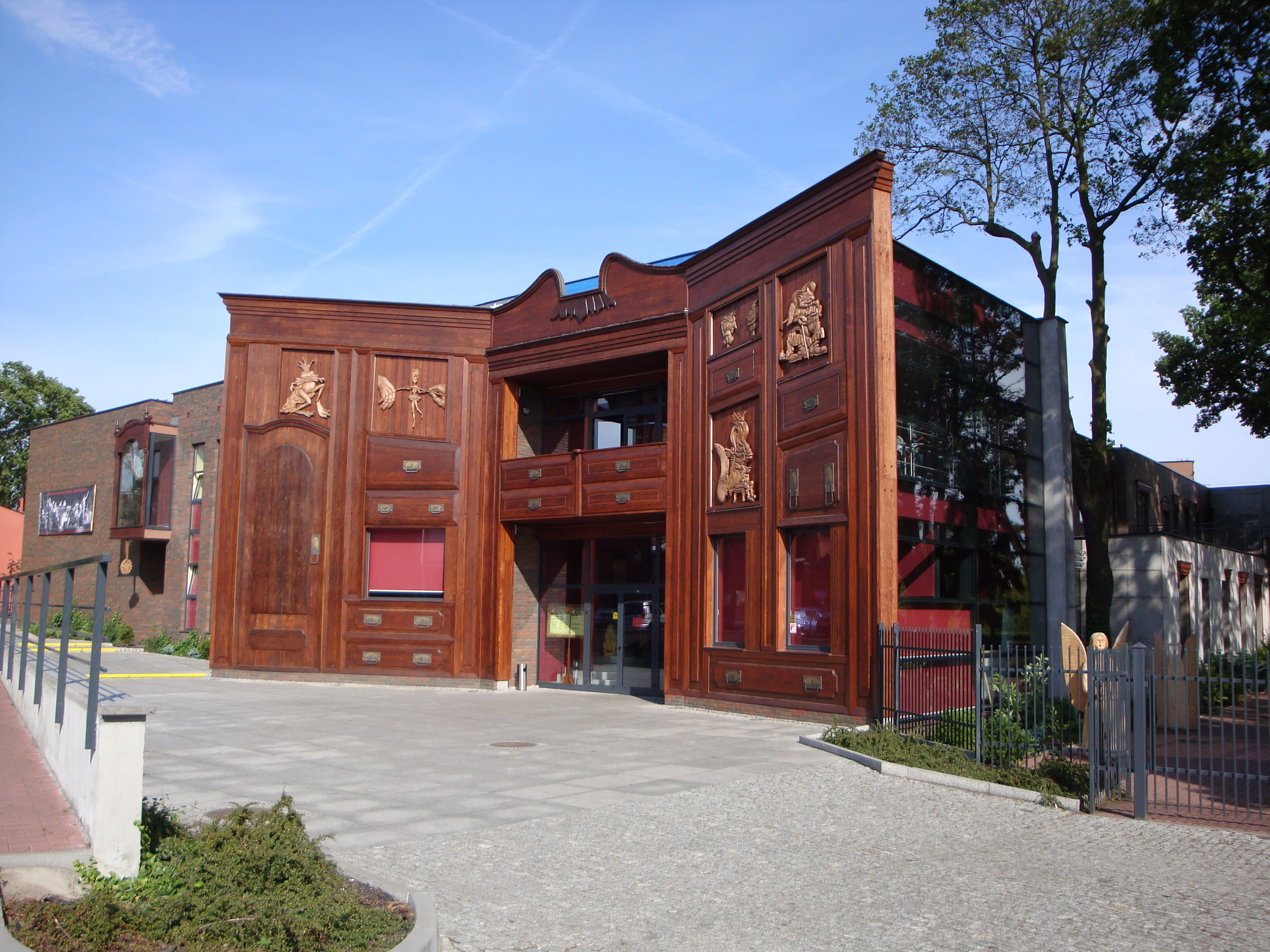
Baj Pomorski Theatre

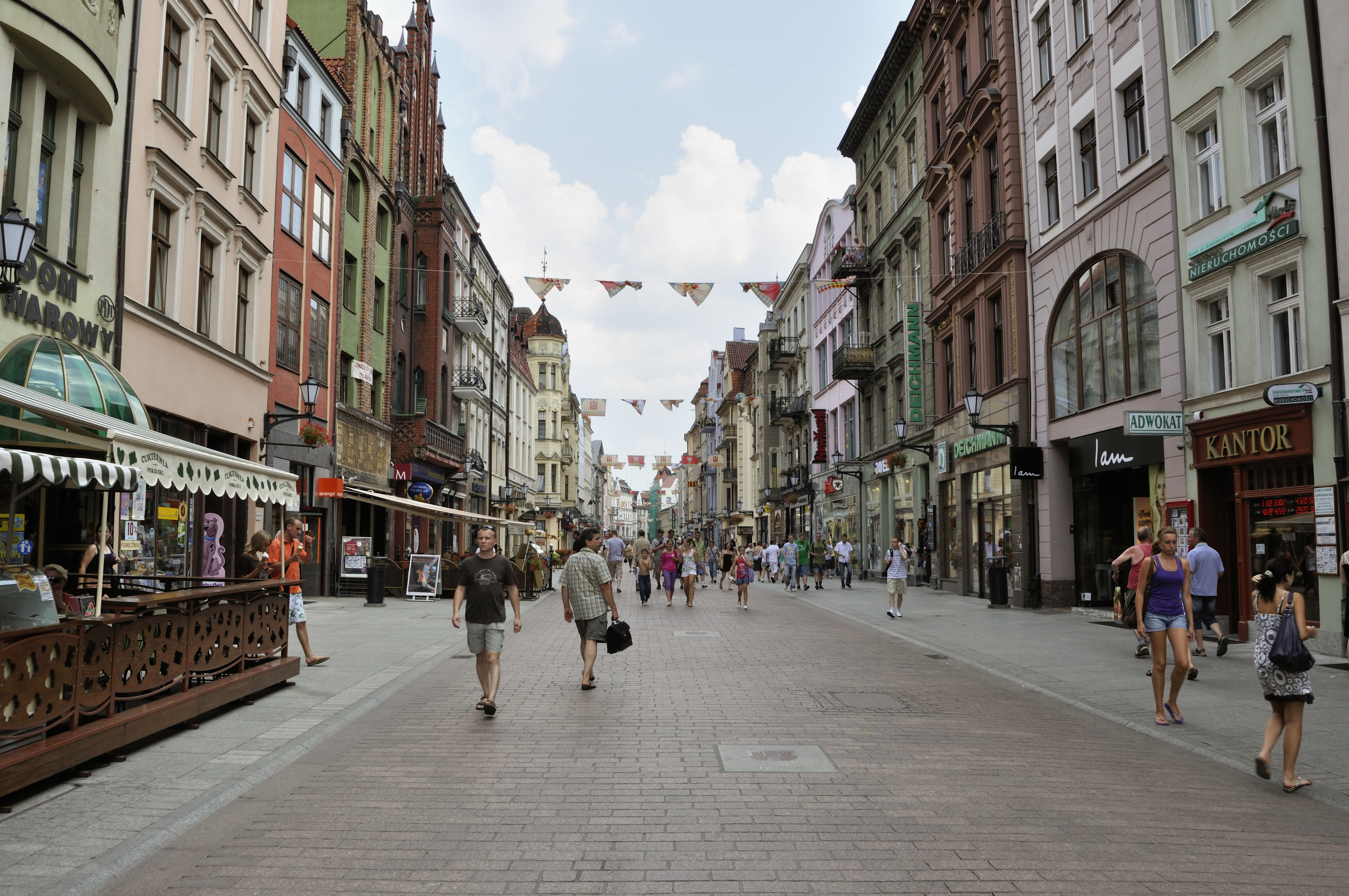
Szeroka Street

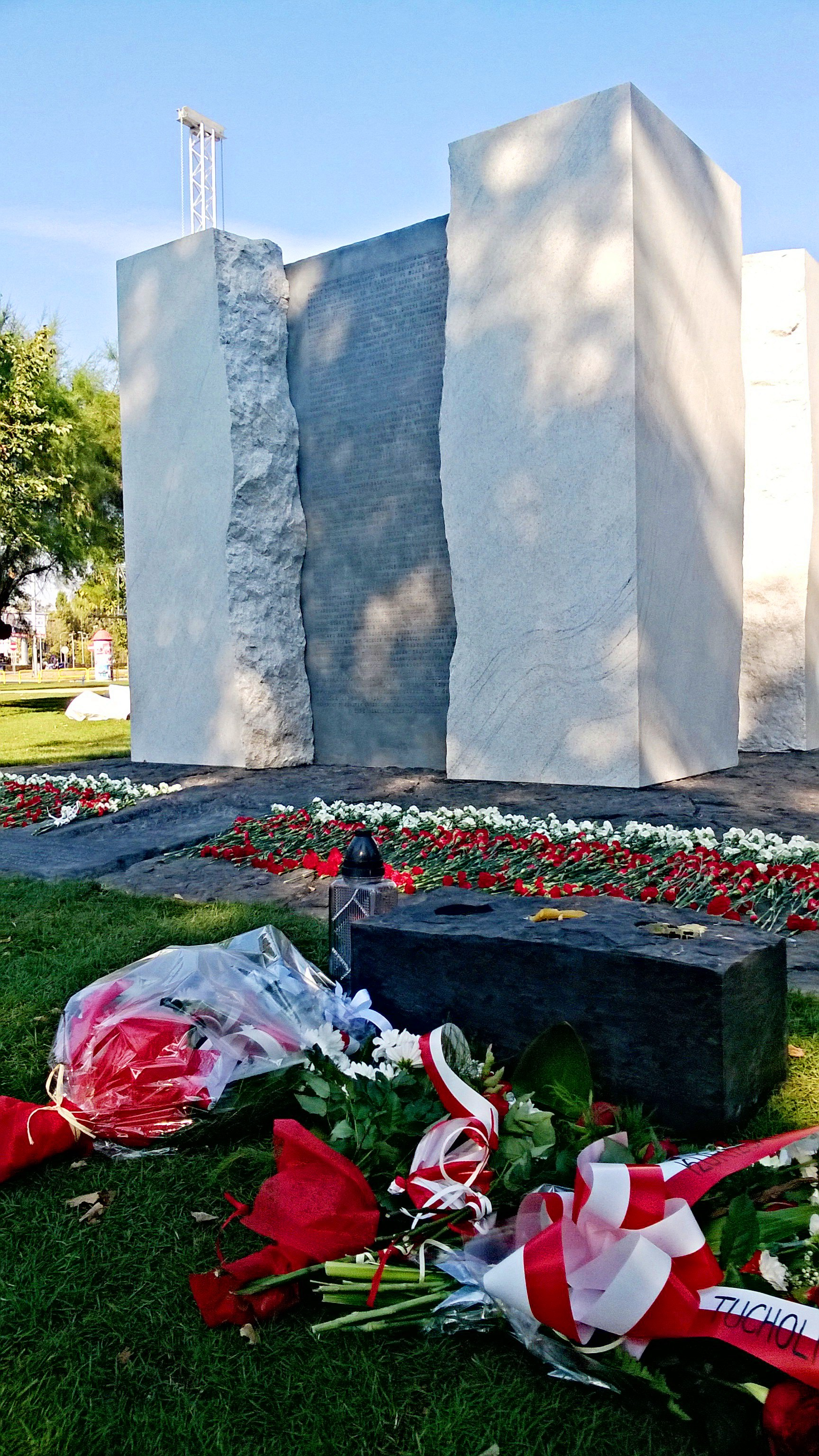
Memorial to the victims of Intelligenzaktion Pommern

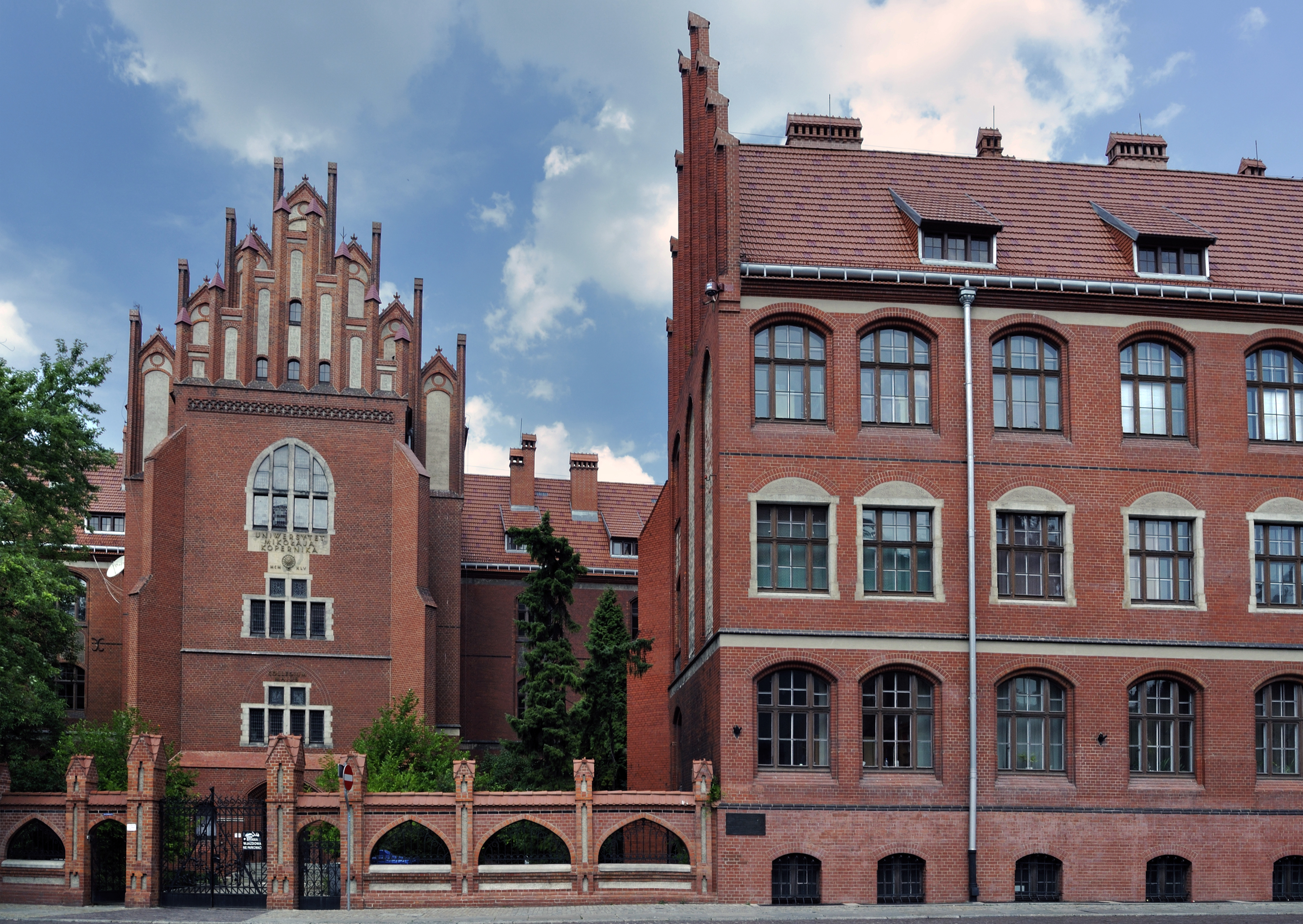
Collegium Maius of the Nicolaus Copernicus University

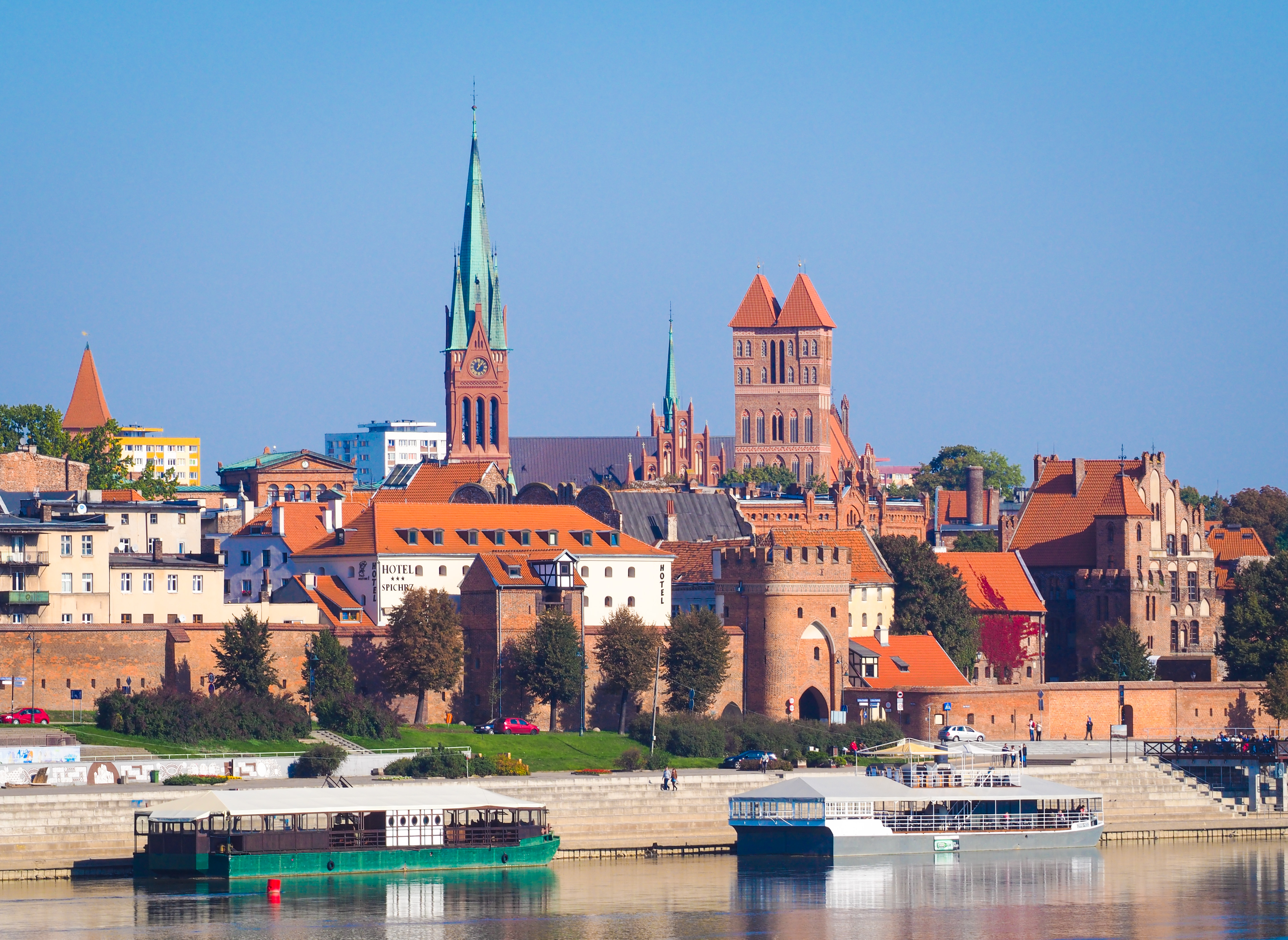
City panorama

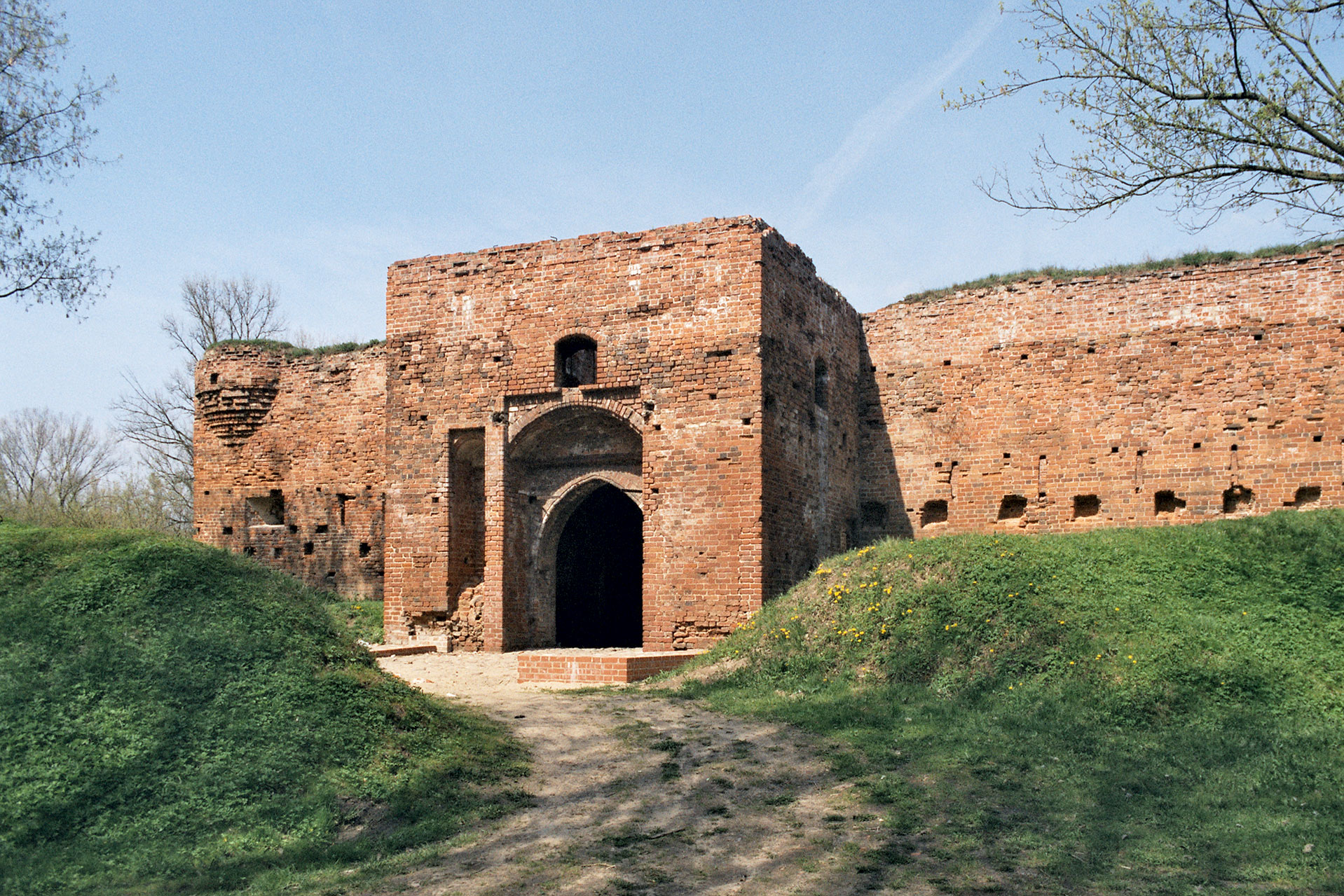
Dybów Castle

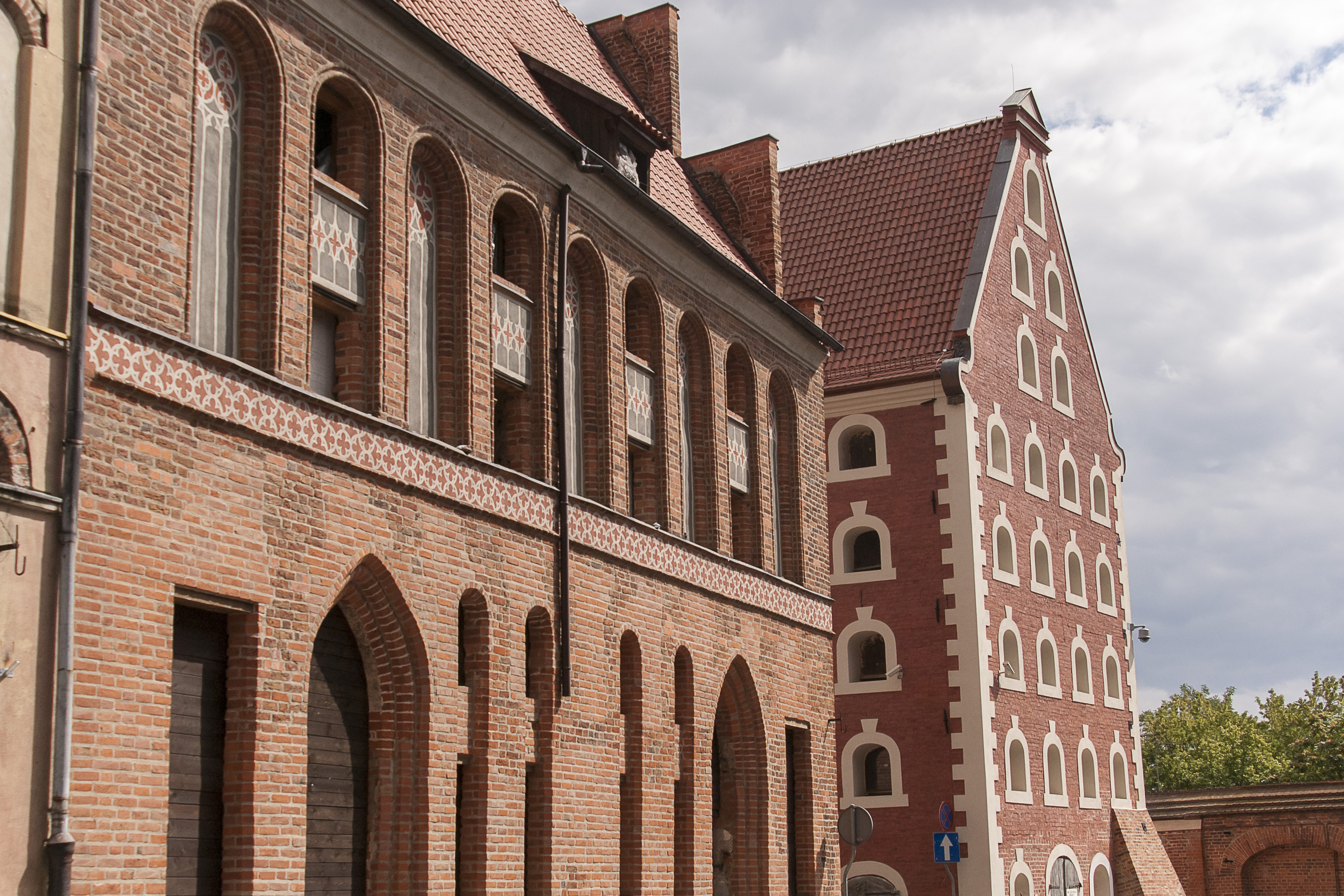
Old granaries in the Old Town

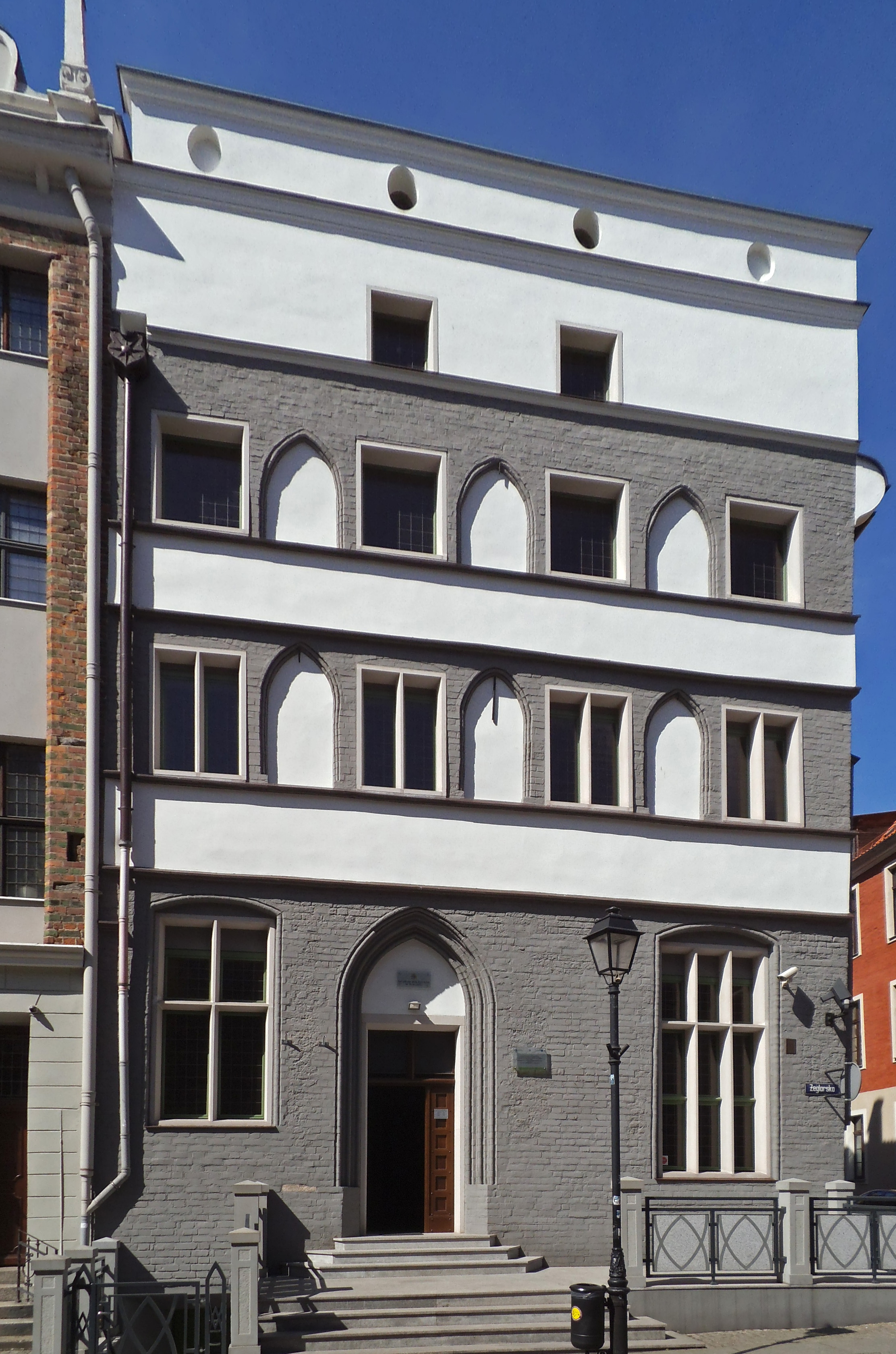
Diocesan Museum

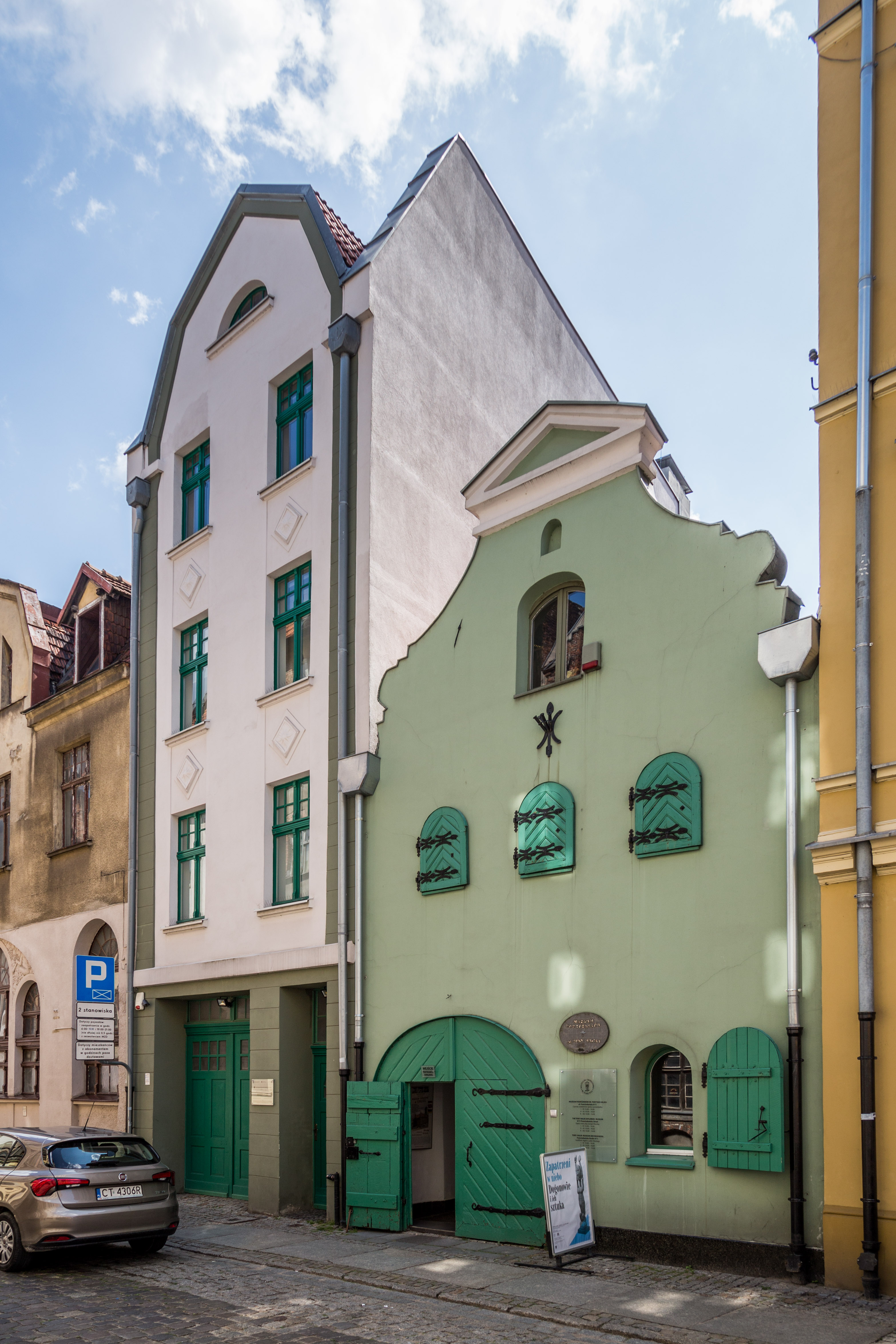
Tony Halik Travelers' Museum

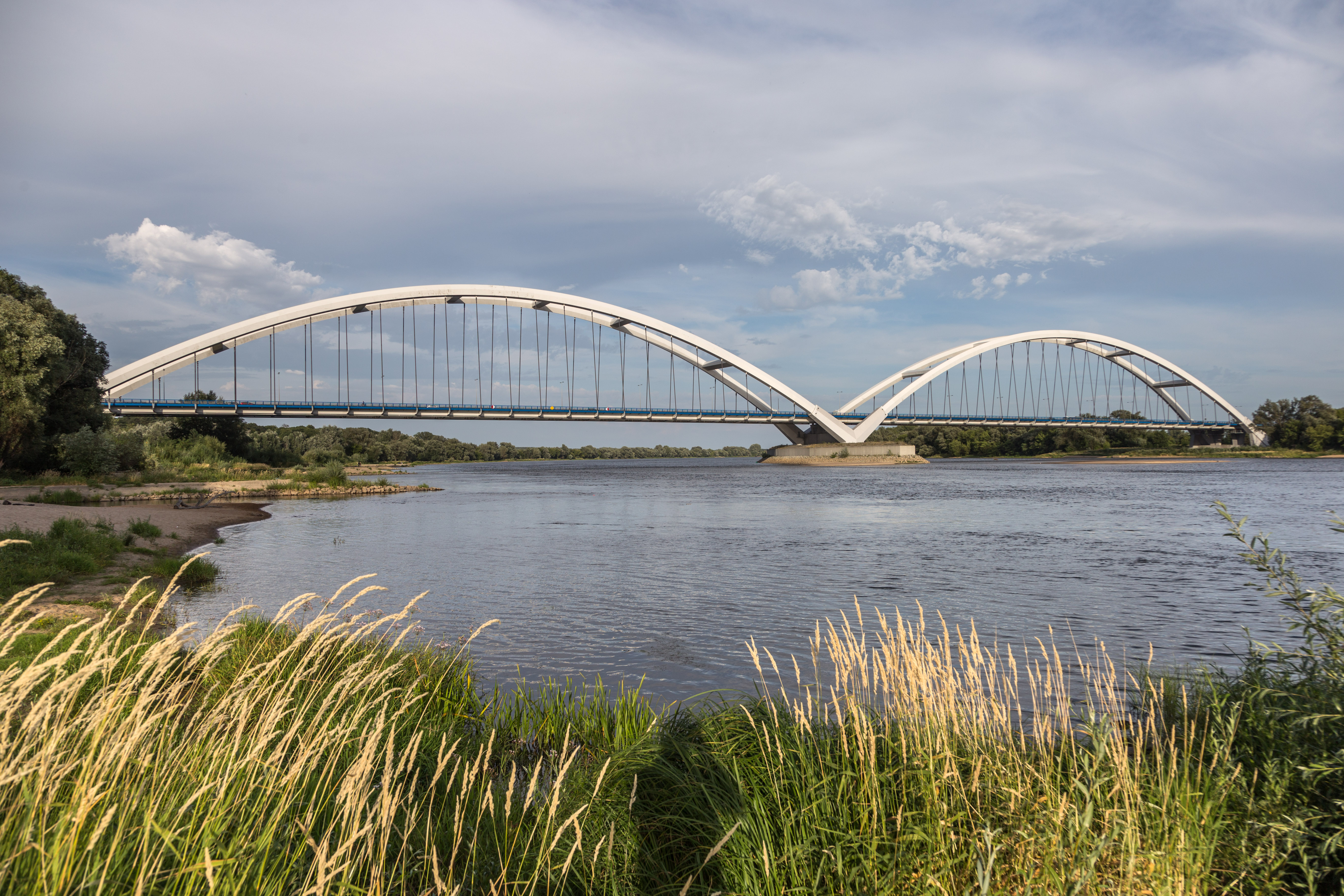
Gen. Elżbieta Zawacka Bridge

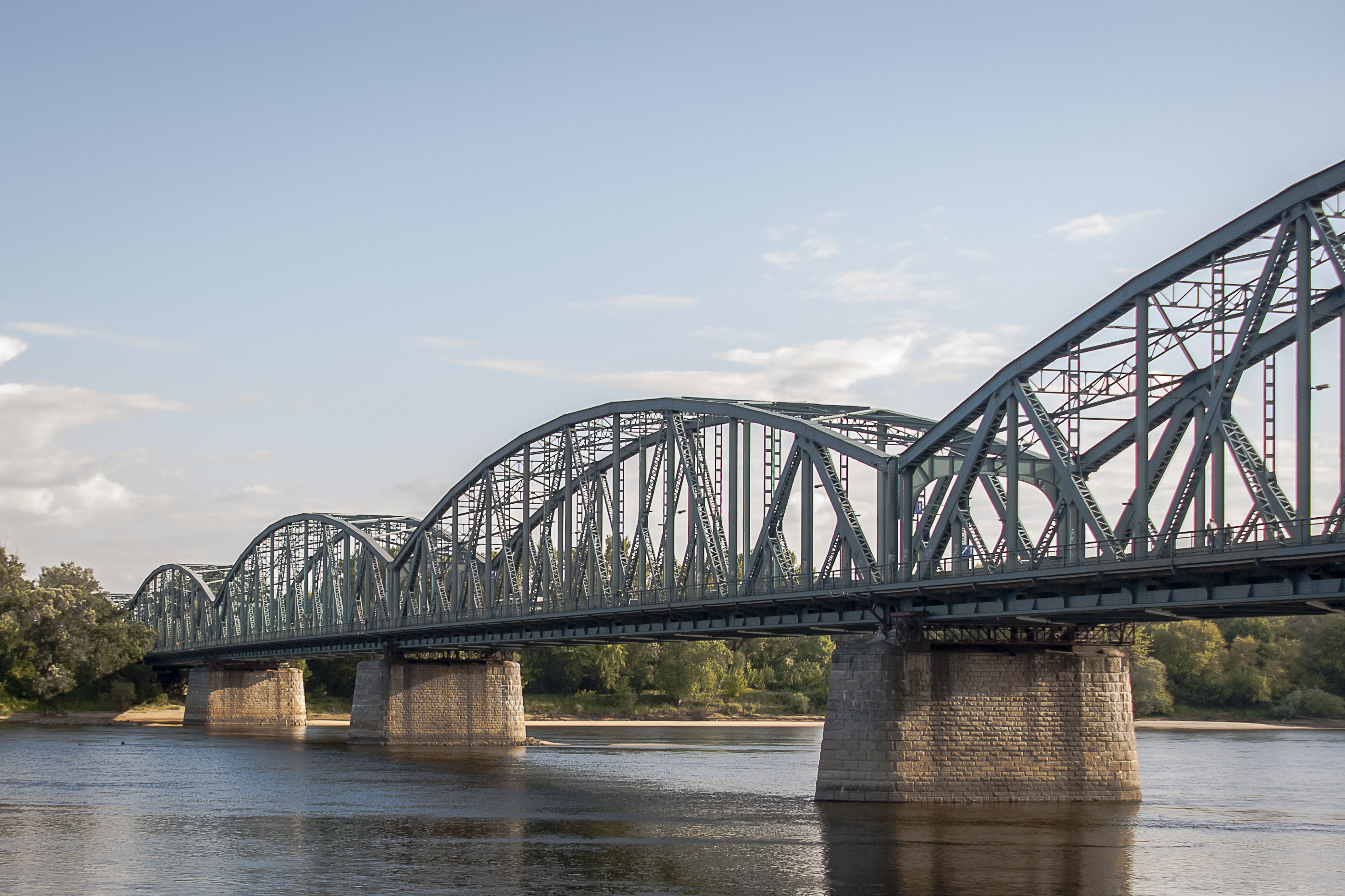
Józef Piłsudski Bridge over the Vistula River

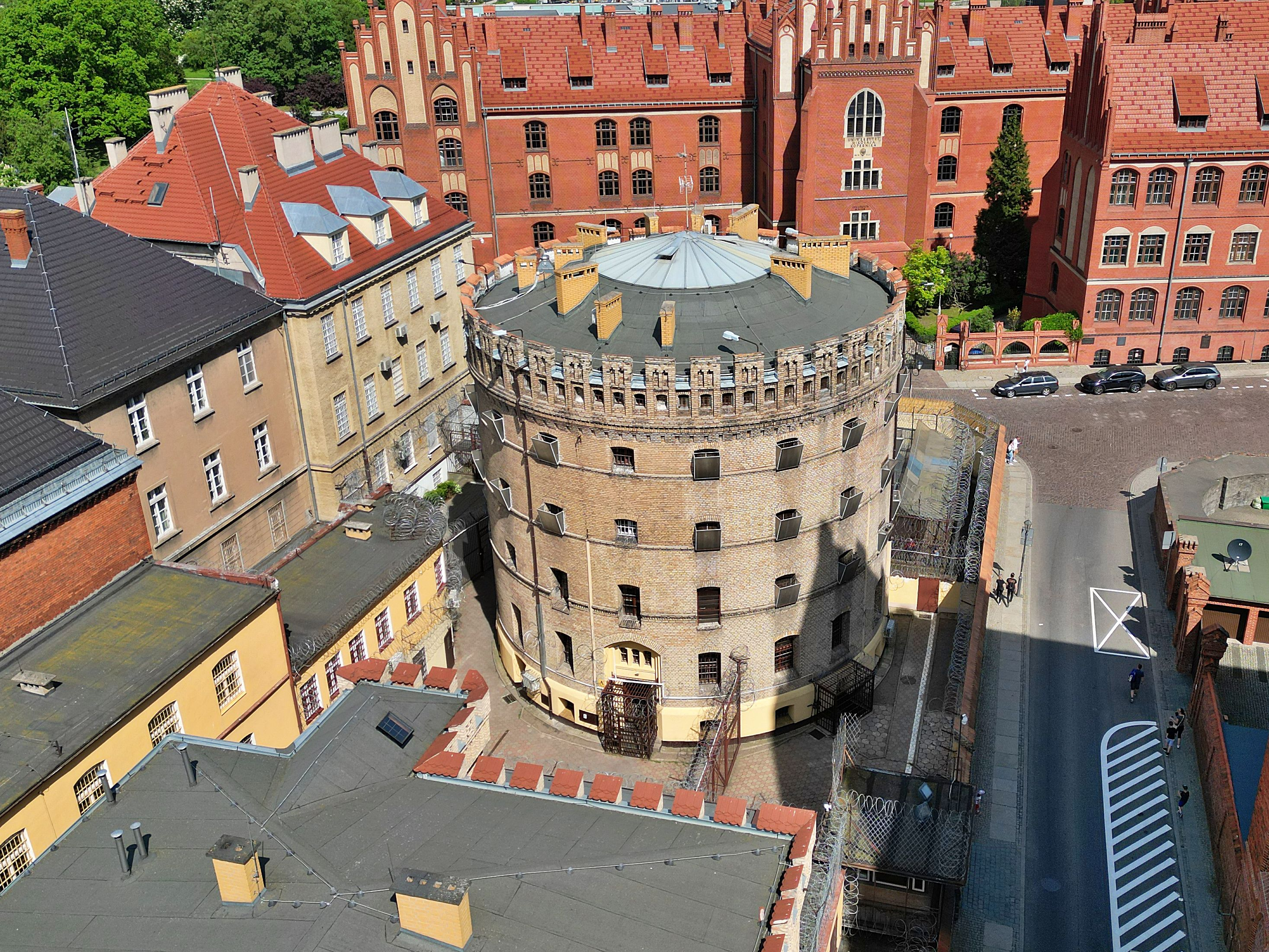
Historic prison building

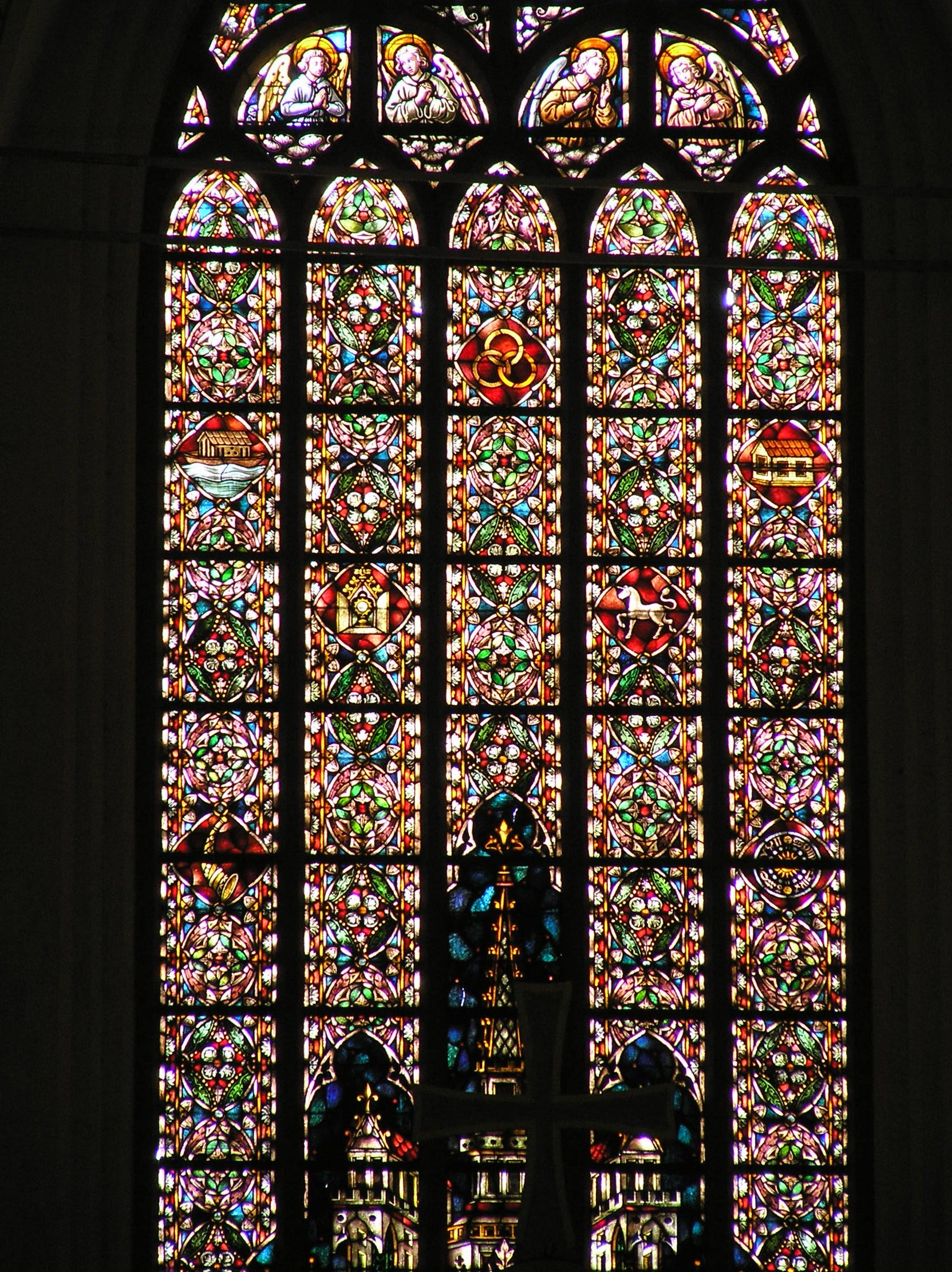
St. Mary's Church

== In popular culture ==
- Thorn (Toruń) is one of the starting towns of the State of the Teutonic Order in the turn-based strategy game Medieval II: Total War: Kingdoms.
- Toruń also makes an appearance in the alternate history real-time strategy video game Command and Conquer: Red Alert; in the Soviet campaign of the game, the player is tasked on liquidating the city's inhabitants after the Soviet leadership discovers resistance fighters had aided escaped test subjects.

== See also ==
- Tourism in Poland
- Gingerbread Museum
- Russians in Toruń
- Ukrainians in Toruń

== Bibliography ==
- Tandecki, Janusz (1995). "Toruń. Historia i rozwój przestrzenny" (PDF). Atlas Historyczny Miast Polskich. 1 (2).
