= Museum of Toruń Gingerbread =

Coordinates: 53°00′40″N 18°36′31″E

- Muzeum Toruńskiego Piernika
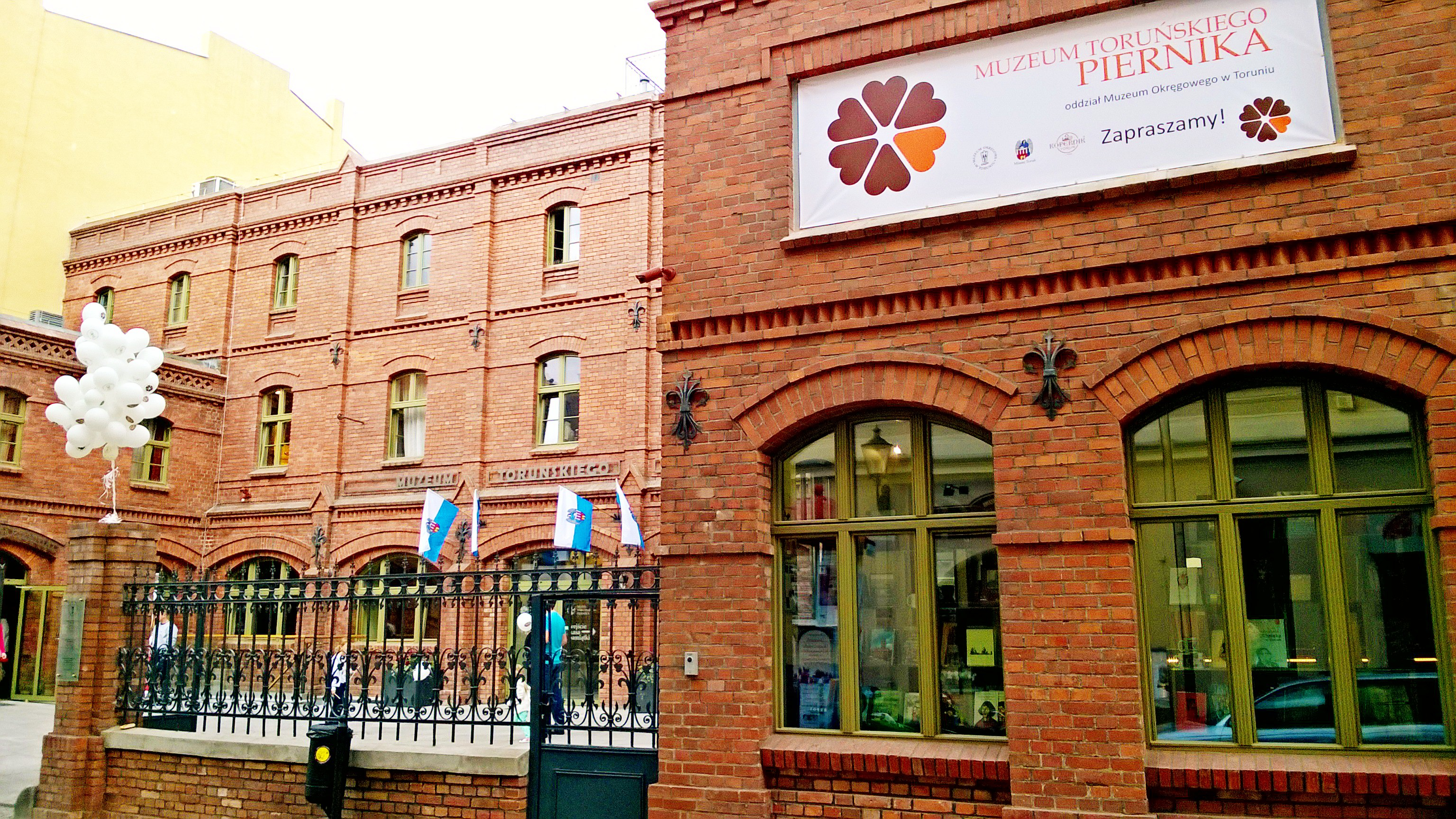
- Established: 2015
- Location: ul. Strumykowa 4, Toruń, Poland
- Type: Food museum
- Website: muzeum.torun.pl/muzeum-torunskiego-piernika/

The Museum of Toruń Gingerbread (Polish: Muzeum Toruńskiego Piernika) is a museum dedicated to Toruń gingerbread. It claims to be the largest gingerbread museum in Europe.

Opened in 2015, it is a branch of the District Museum in Toruń and was created with the cooperation with Kopernik, the oldest Polish confectionery company. Kopernik traces it roots to a gingerbread workshop established in 1763 by Johann Weese. The museum is located in the former factory building, built by Weese family in 1885. Earlier, the District Museum's collection of gingerbread-related artifacts was displayed in the cellars of the Copernicus House in Toruń.

The museum has 1200 square metres of exhibition space on three floors. Included are a children’s area, interactive displays, videos, communist era interiors recreation, etc. Culinary workshops are offered to the visitors as well. The museum boasts a large collection of wooden gingerbread moulds.

== See also ==
- Toruń gingerbread
- District Museum in Toruń
- Confectionery Factory "Kopernik"
