= Confectionery Factory "Kopernik" =

Confectionery company, 1763, Toruń, Poland

Coordinates: 53°01′21″N 18°38′33″E

Fabryka Cukiernicza "Kopernik"
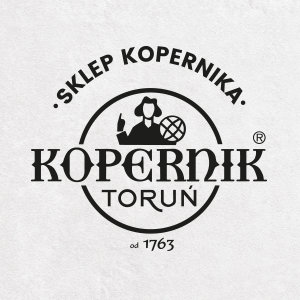
- Cukiernia "Kopernik"
- Company type: Firm
- Industry: Pâtisserie
- Founded: 1763; 262 years ago in Toruń, Poland
- Founder: Johann Weese
- Headquarters: Toruń, Poland
- Area served: Poland
- Products: Gingerbread
- Website: kopernik.com.pl

The Confectionery Factory "Kopernik" is a firm producing gingerbread and other sweets based in Toruń, Poland. It is headquartered at 34 Stanisława Żółkiewskiego street in Toruń. Still operating as of 2016, it is the oldest confectionery company in Poland, established in 1763.

== History ==
=== Johann Weese's factory ===
The gingerbread factory was founded in 1763 by Johann Weese (1731–1775). He was the son of Christina née Glaser and Gottfried Weese, a shopkeeper who settled in Toruń from Gdańsk in 1728.

In April 1747, Johann learnt the trade of gingerbread baking from Melchior Friebe. After Friebe's death around 1760, Johann Weese married his widow Elżbieta née Lorentz. As a result of the marriage, he became the owner of Melchior's gingerbread factory. Elżbieta died around 1762 and bequeathed the estate to her husband and her daughter Dorota Elżbieta Mędzikowska (from her first marriage). On February 14, 1763, Johann Weese married Dorotha Schreiber, the widow of Johann Samuel Schreiber the younger, another gingerbread master.

In 1763, Johann founded his own gingerbread workshop, located at 5/9 Małe Garbary street in Toruń as of 2003.

Johann Weese died on March 9, 1775, of dropsy. His wife Dorotha ran the plant until her death in 1796. The factory fell into the hands of her younger son, Andreas Michael Weese.

=== Prussian period ===
In the middle of the 19th century, the Weese family owned several production plots in Toruń: at 9/11 Sadlarska street (currently 20 Królowej Jadwigi street), 3 Strumykowa and 5/9 Małe Garbary street.

In 1885, a thorough reconstruction of the factory at 4 Strumykowa street was launched.

The aging gingerbread workshops were transformed into a larger, modern factory by Johann's grandson, Gustav. From 1908 to 1913, he decided to build a modern factory at Fritz-Reutersstrasse (currently Żółkiewskiego Street), where the entire production was eventually moved in 1914. Under Gustav's management, the plant increased its exports to countries like Turkey, China, Japan and Australia.

In 1908, the company was employing 105 workers.

=== Interwar and WWII period ===
During the interwar period, over 200 employees worked in Weese's plant. In 1939, the company was purchased by the Polish Cooperative Społem (Polish: Krajowy Związek Rewizyjny Spółdzielni Spożywców "Społem"). In the same year, gingerbread baked in old wooden molds from the Weese factory were presented at the 1939 New York World's Fair.

During World War II, the factory was destroyed and most of the equipment was stolen by the German occupying forces.

=== PRL period (1946–1989) ===
The gingerbread plant was rebuilt at the end of the conflict and was taken over by the Confectionery Industry Association based in Warsaw. In 1951, the factory was renamed Gingerbread and Confectionery Factory "Kopernik" (Polish: Fabryka Pierników i Wyrobów Cukierniczych "Kopernik"), gathering all the employees who were working in Toruń in the different plants before WWII (Weese, Thomas Hermann, Jan Ruchniewocz etc.).

Throughout the entire PRL period, "Kopernik" was the only producer of Toruń gingerbread in the country.

=== Recent period ===
In 1991, the business was privatized and changed into a joint-stock company, Fabryka Cukiernicza "Kopernik" SA. At the time, it was the first confectionery company in Poland to be privatized in the form of employee shareholding.

"Kopernik" Confectionery Factory has been the main sponsor of a campaign since 2003, honoring famous Toruń residents, located on the Gingerbread Alley of Stars in Toruń (Polish: Piernikowa Aleja Gwiazd w Toruniu) at the Dwór Artus. As of 2016, "Kopernik" has around 250 personnel.

Toruńskie Gingerbread now reaches Great Britain thanks to a cooperation with Tesco as well as Morocco and Taiwan through Auchan selling network.

Since 2015, the former factory at 4 Strumykowa street, designed by Reinhard Uebrick, has been housing the Toruń Gingerbread Museum, as a branch of the District Museum in Toruń.

The Toruń-based professional basketball team is named Twarde Pierniki Toruń (Hard Gingerbread Toruń).

== Products ==
- "Katarzynka", a unique-shape chocolate-coated gingerbread cake, which dates back to Johann Weese's 1763 era;
- "Toruńskie Pierniki", small size chunk of gingerbread cakes, with various flavors;
- "Wafel Teatralny", a waffle launched in the PRL period;
- "Z Serca Fabryki" (From the factory heart), a brand encompassing various gingerbread cakes ("Serca Toruńskie", stuffed "Pierniki Nadziewane", "Uszatki"...);
- Waflowe (Waffle);
- "Bagatelka", a crispy, light cookie with raisins and fruit filling.

The gingerbread recipe has not changed since the 16th century.

== Gallery ==
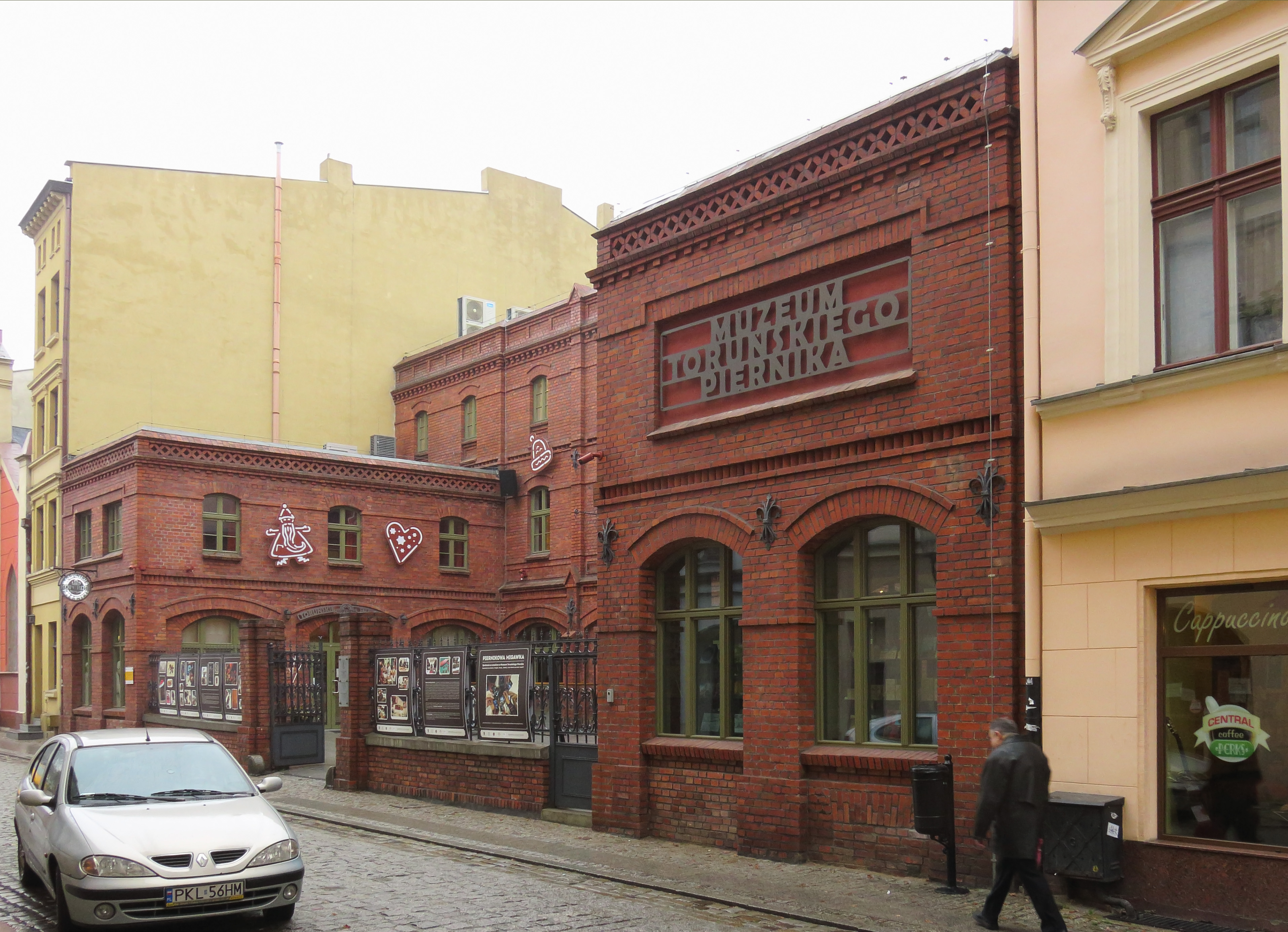
Gustav Weese 1885 factory. Now Toruń Gingerbread Museum

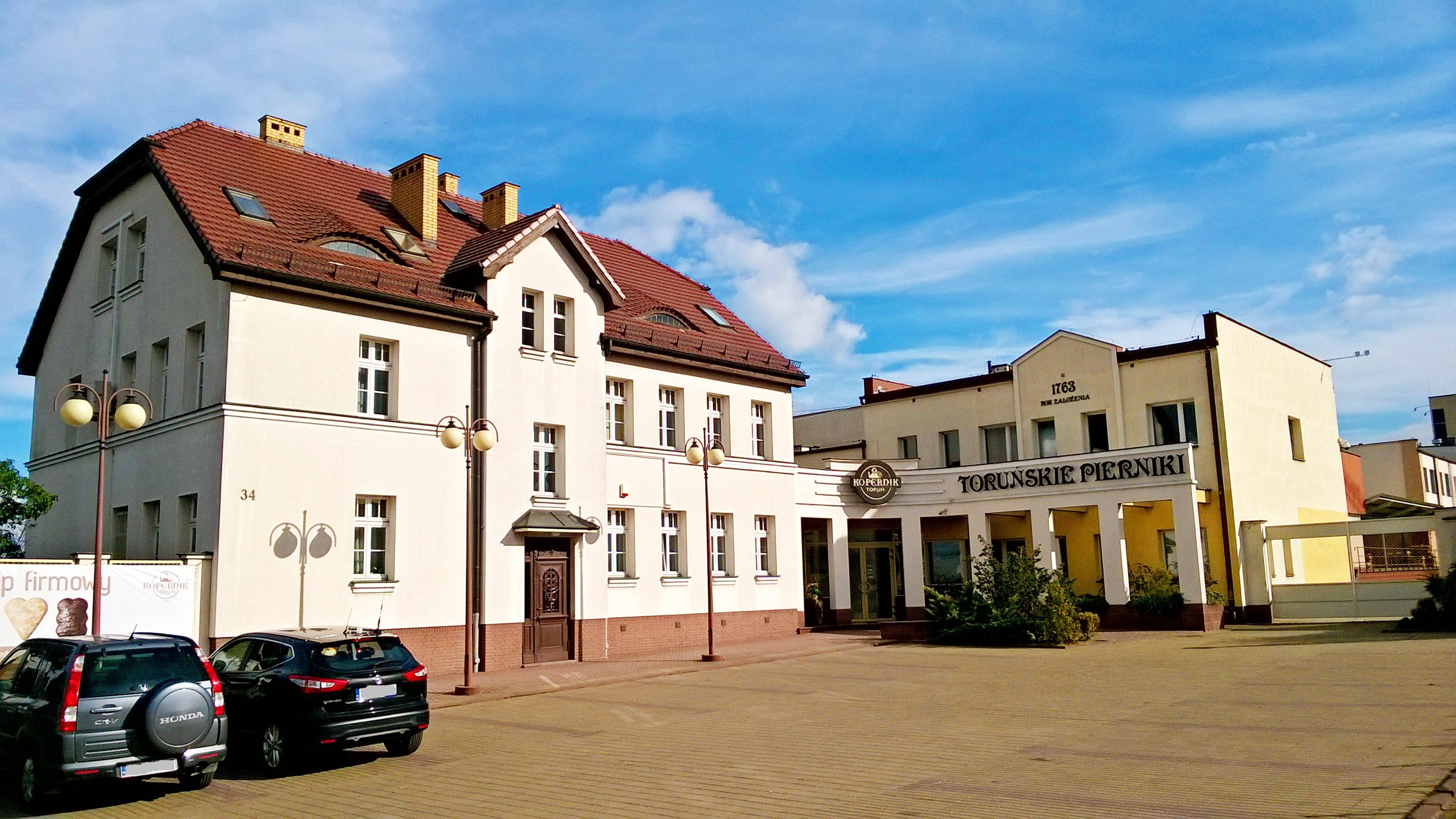
Current "Kopernik" factory

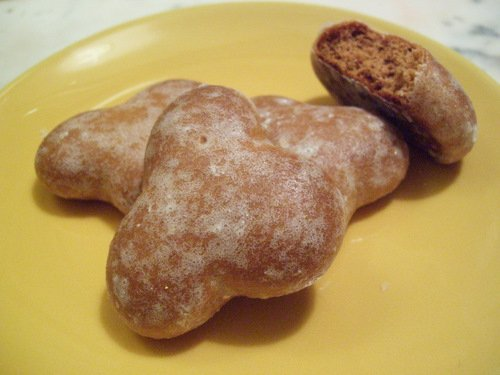
"Kopernik - Uszatki

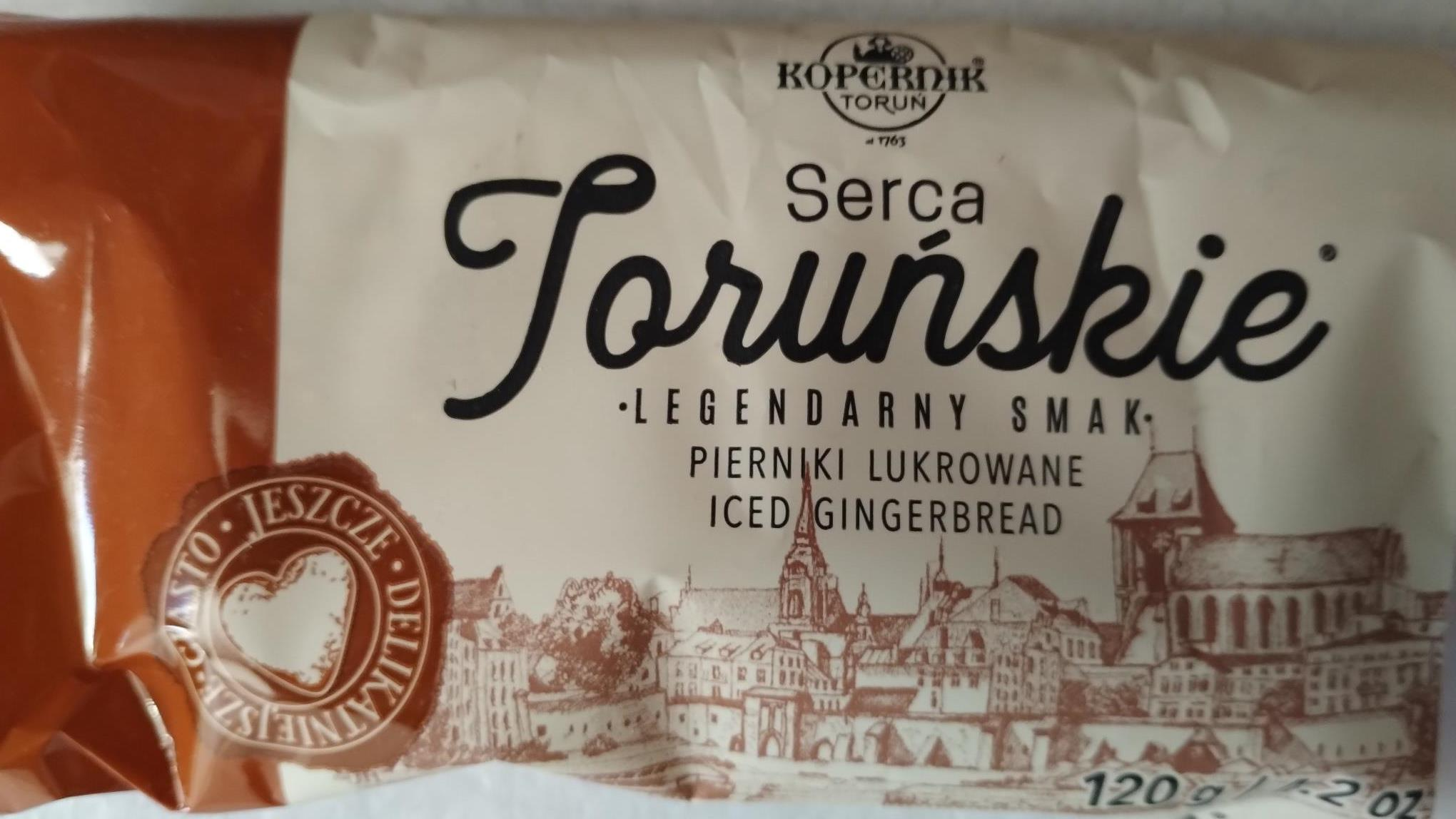
3Kopernik" - Serca Toruńskie

== See also ==
- Toruń
- Toruń gingerbread
- Muzeum Piernika
- District Museum in Toruń
