= Living Museum of Gingerbread =

Coordinates: 53°00′31″N 18°36′17″E

- Żywe Muzeum Piernika w Toruniu
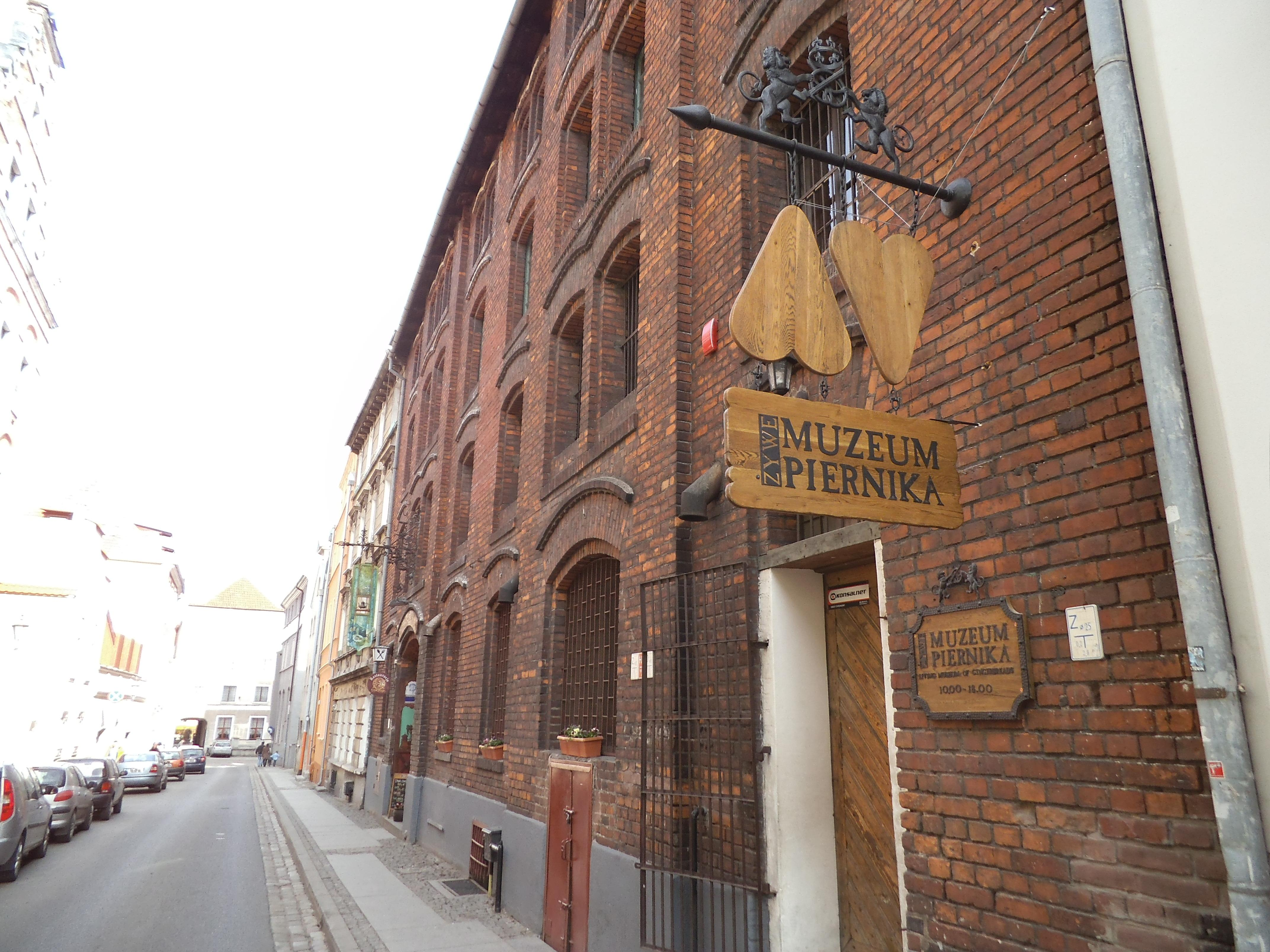
- Established: 2006
- Location: Rabiańska 9, 87-100, Toruń
- Type: Food museum
- Website: muzeumpiernika.pl

Żywe Muzeum Piernika (English: Living Museum of Gingerbread) is a hands-on experience tourist attraction located in medieval old town of Toruń, Poland, that is famous for its gingerbread. Visitors take part in an interactive show through which they are taught how to make a traditional gingerbread. The show consist of two parts – first visitors are shown how the dough was made in Middle Ages. Having prepared dough, everyone then makes their own gingerbread using traditional baking molds. Throughout the whole show visitors are guided by the master of bakery, a gingerbread witch and the craftsmen.

The museum is located on 9, Rabiańska Strett, in an early 19th-century granary, and visitors also participate in flour production using millstones. The museum forms part of the gingerbread tradition still living in town.

== See also ==
- Muzeum Toruńskiego Piernika (a different facility with a similar name, this is a proper museum with several rooms filled with exhibits, a branch of the District Museum in Toruń)
- List of food and beverage museums
