= Toruń gingerbread =

Polish gingerbread

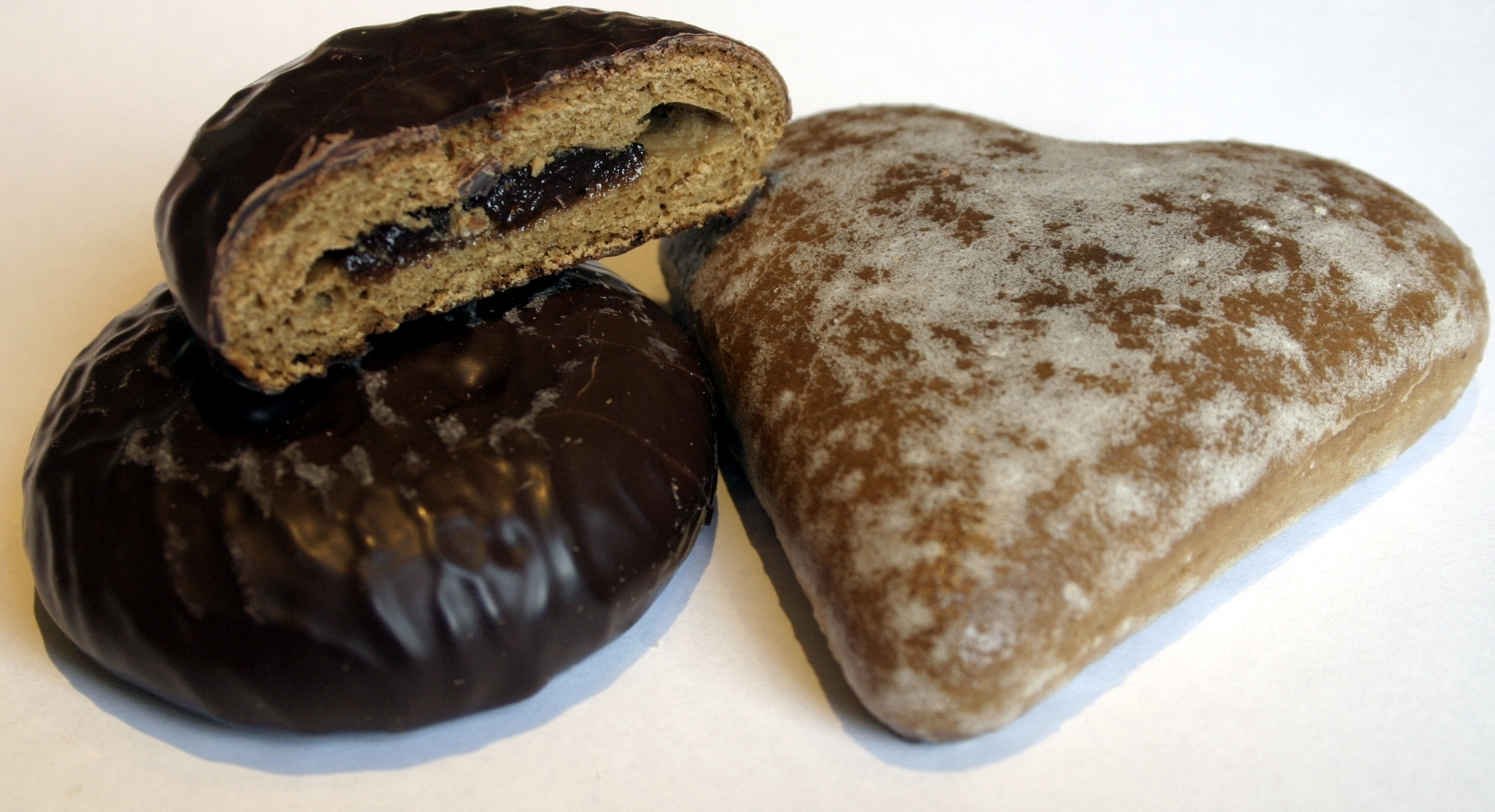
- Gingerbreads of different shapes
- Type: Biscuit
- Place of origin: Poland
- Region or state: Toruń
- Created by: Nicoalus Czan (archetype), Johann Weese (on an industrial scale)
- Main ingredients: spices, honey, rye flour
- Food energy (per serving): 340–365 kcal (1,420–1,530 kJ)

Toruń gingerbread (Polish: pierniki toruńskie, German: Thorner Lebkuchen) is a traditional Polish gingerbread that has been produced since the Middle Ages in the city of Toruń.

== History ==
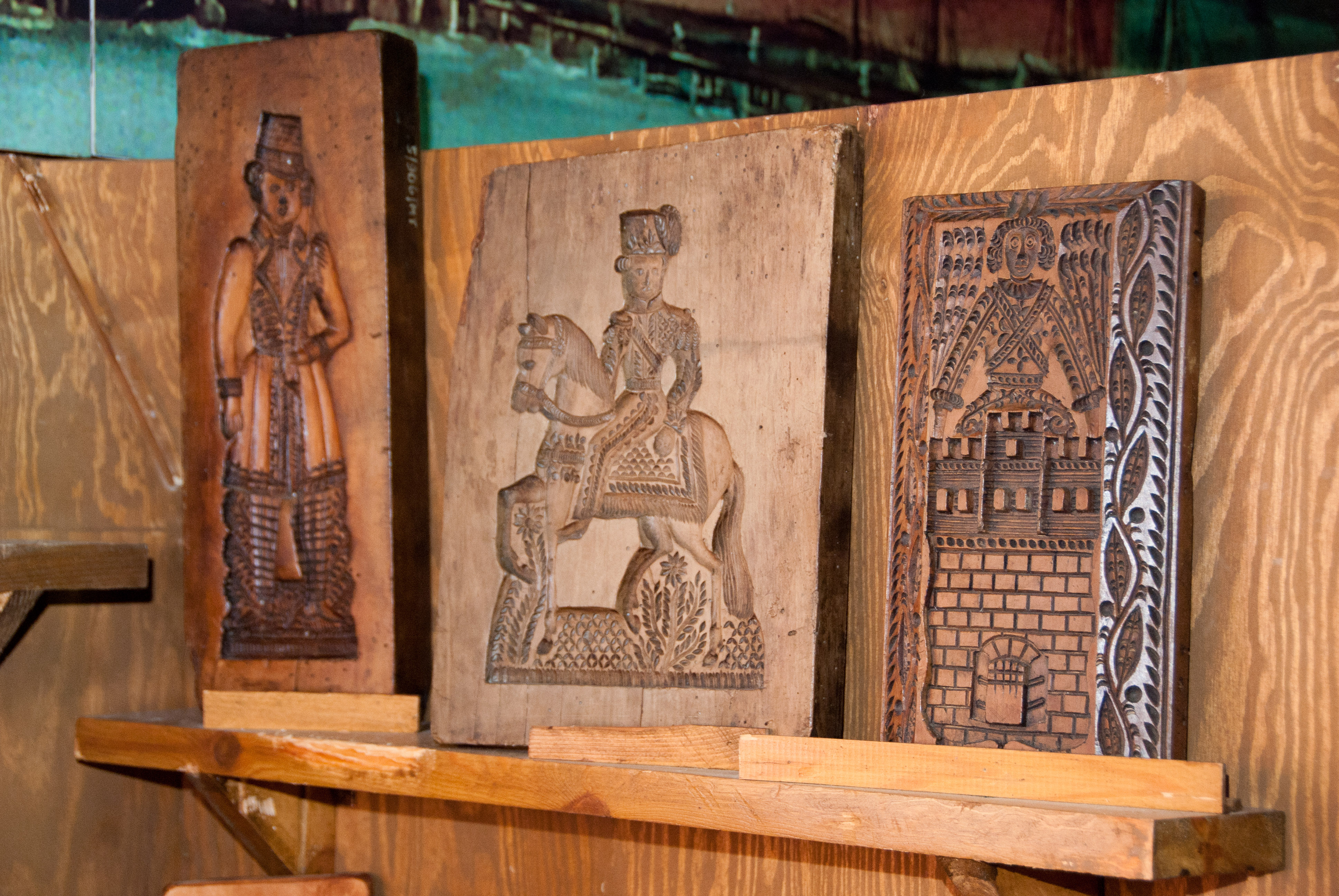
Traditional wooden gingerbread mold

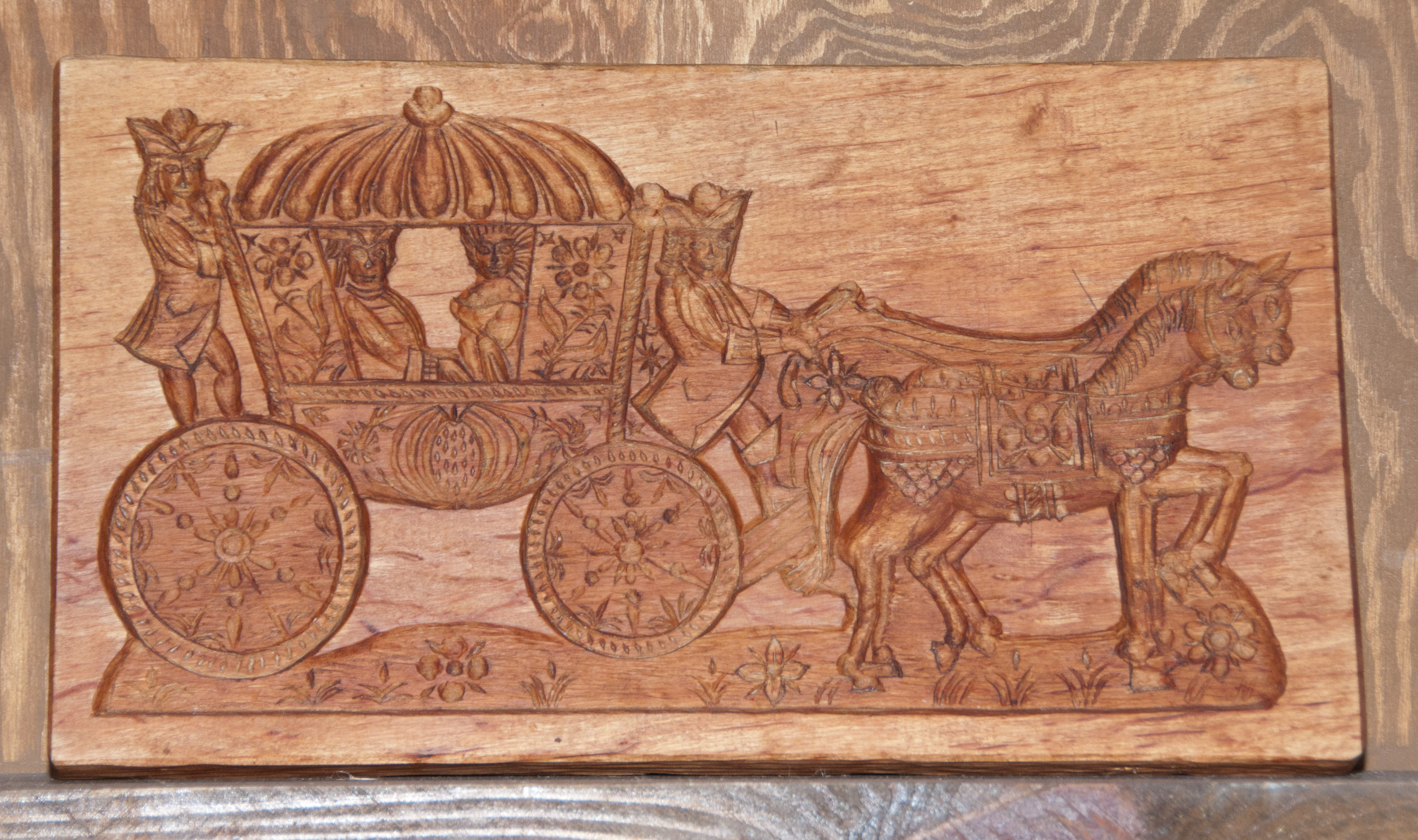
Example of a wooden gingerbread mold

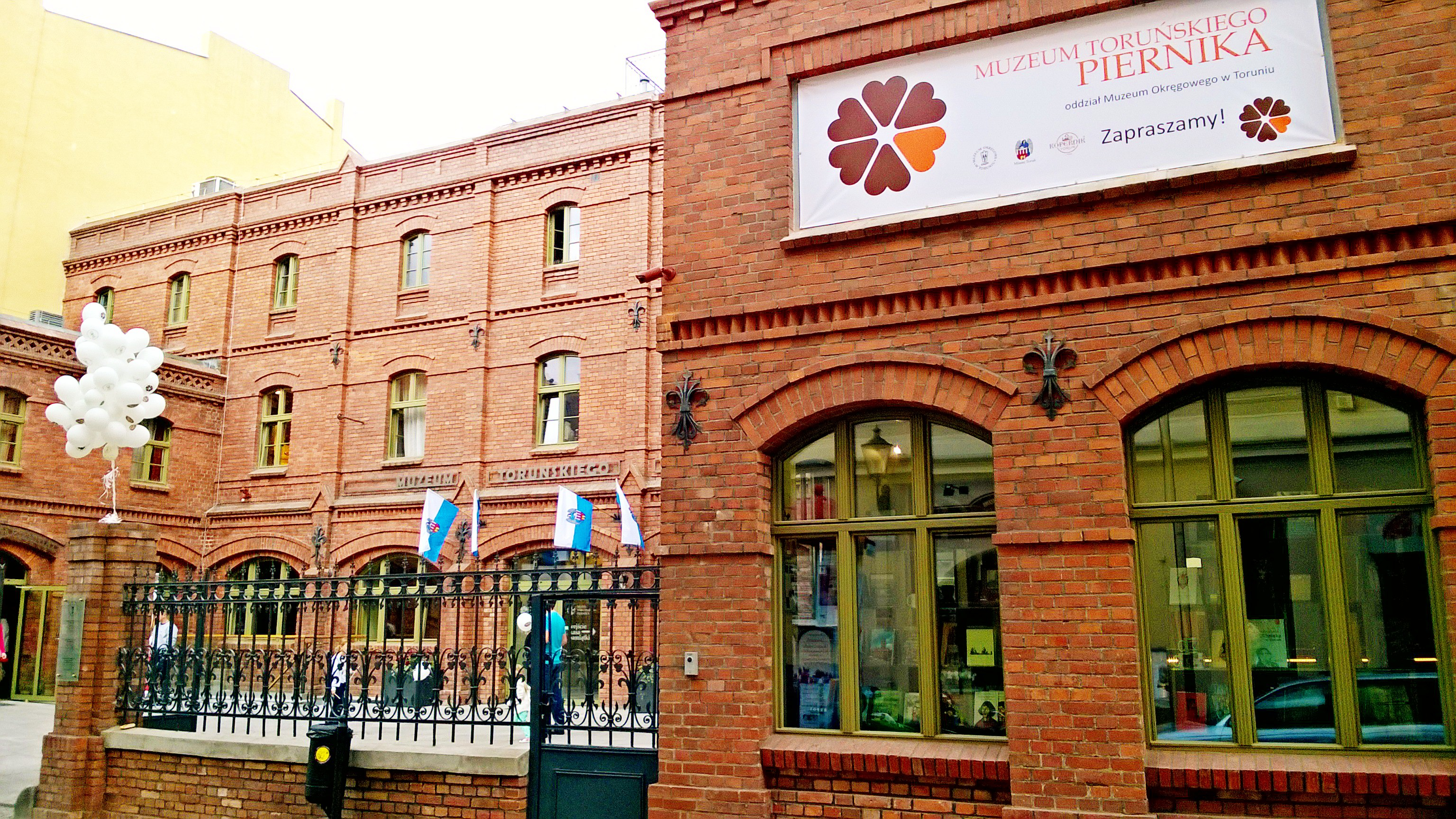
Museum of Toruń Gingerbread

Old Polish sayings connect Toruń with making of some form of gingerbread, and the expansion of the craft, which started in the 13th century.

A considerable factor behind the development of gingerbread-making in Toruń was its excellent location. Situated on high-quality soil, the area provided fine wheat for flour, while nearby villages provided honey. The necessary spices were brought from remote countries, mainly India, via a route through the Black Sea and Lwów to the Holy Roman Empire, where the spices were transported by north-German trade companies. Some also came by sea to the port of Gdańsk.

The very first mention of Toruń gingerbread comes from 1380 and speaks of a local baker called Niclos Czana. The product quickly gained fame across Poland and abroad. Toruń and the city of Nuremberg, itself famous for special gingerbread, were eager to protect the secrets of their recipes from each other. Finally in 1556, they formed an agreement by which each city could bake the specialties of the other.

The artisans were not the only ones engaged in the production of the delicacy. In the 16th century, the Cistercian Order on the outskirts of Toruń prospered mainly due to this activity and even sold their product to other countries. During the 17th century, the well-known workshop of the Grauer family appeared. The city authorities were supportive of the lucrative trade and issued several tax breaks on spice imports and export by bakers' guilds so that the trade could be increased.

In the 18th and 19th century, the city saw a fall in baking and other craftsmanship. In 1825, only three bakers were left. With the advent of capitalism, large companies took over from the local craftsmen and mass production of the gingerbread ensued.

The largest factory was owned by Gustav Weese, based on tradition dating from 1763, when Johann Weese started to bake gingerbread. Gustav Traugott Weese inherited a small workshop after his father Andreas in 1824 and changed it into a large company. In 1875 the Toruń Gazette (Gazeta Toruńska) wrote on New Year's Eve that due to the demand it was even sold in Africa. Other exotic places of export included Turkey, Japan, China and Honolulu. In 1913, Gustav Weese, a descendant of Gustav Traugott Weese, constructed a factory which, after World War I ended, was employing over 500 workers. Gustav Weese sold it in January 1939 to the Polish company "Społem" and left for his other gingerbread factory in Germany. The company in Toruń still exists and is the oldest confectionery company in Poland today and one of the oldest in the world.

Besides Weese's factory there was also the Hermann Thomas company founded in 1857, which in 1907 employed 200 workers. Another important company engaged in the production of gingerbread was founded by Jan Ruchniewicz in 1907. The enterprise prospered quite successfully and had 50 workers. It was especially known for the ornamental gingerbread topped with Toruń's crest.

== Toruń gingerbread in Polish culture ==
Pierniki Toruńskie, as they are known in Polish, are an icon of Poland's national cuisine. They have traditionally been presented as a gift by the city of Toruń to Polish leaders, artists and others who have distinguished themselves in Polish society, and to Polish kings. Baking molds survive with likenesses of king Sigismund III of Poland, king Władysław IV Vasa and Queen Cecilia Renata as well as the royal seal with the Polish eagle and crests of several provinces. Other notables who have received gift gingerbread from the city include Marie Casimire Louise (French princess and widow of King John III Sobieski), Napoléon Bonaparte (during whose visit the whole city was illuminated and bells were rung all over the city), Zygmunt Krasiński (one of Poland's Three Bards), painter Jan Matejko, actress Helena Modjeska, Marshal Józef Piłsudski, pianist Artur Rubinstein, poet Czesław Miłosz, Lech Wałęsa and Pope John Paul II.

Since at least the Middle Ages, pierniki have been connected with Toruń in Polish proverbs and legends. One legend claims that gingerbread was a gift from the Queen of the Bees to the apprentice Bogumił. A 17th-century epigram by poet Fryderyk Hoffman speaks of the four best things in Poland: "The vodka of Gdańsk, Toruń gingerbread, the ladies of Kraków, and the Warsaw shoes".

The 18th-century poet and fabulist Ignacy Krasicki, who greatly favored the gingerbread, wrote of them in his celebrated poems.

When the precocious 15-year-old composer Frédéric Chopin visited Szafarnia, a small village near the river Drwęca, he stopped over in Toruń, where he was a guest of his godfather, the penologist Fryderyk Florian Skarbek. Chopin sampled the city's famous confection and grew so fond of it that he wrote a letter about it to his friends and colleagues. He even sent some to Warsaw. In honor of this, Poland's largest producer of Toruń gingerbread, the Kopernik Confectionery Company, has created a special heart-shaped gingerbread called Scherzo, bearing Chopin's likeness on the wrapper.

Toruń holds an annual celebration of gingerbread called Święto Piernika (the Gingerbread Festival).

== Current producers ==
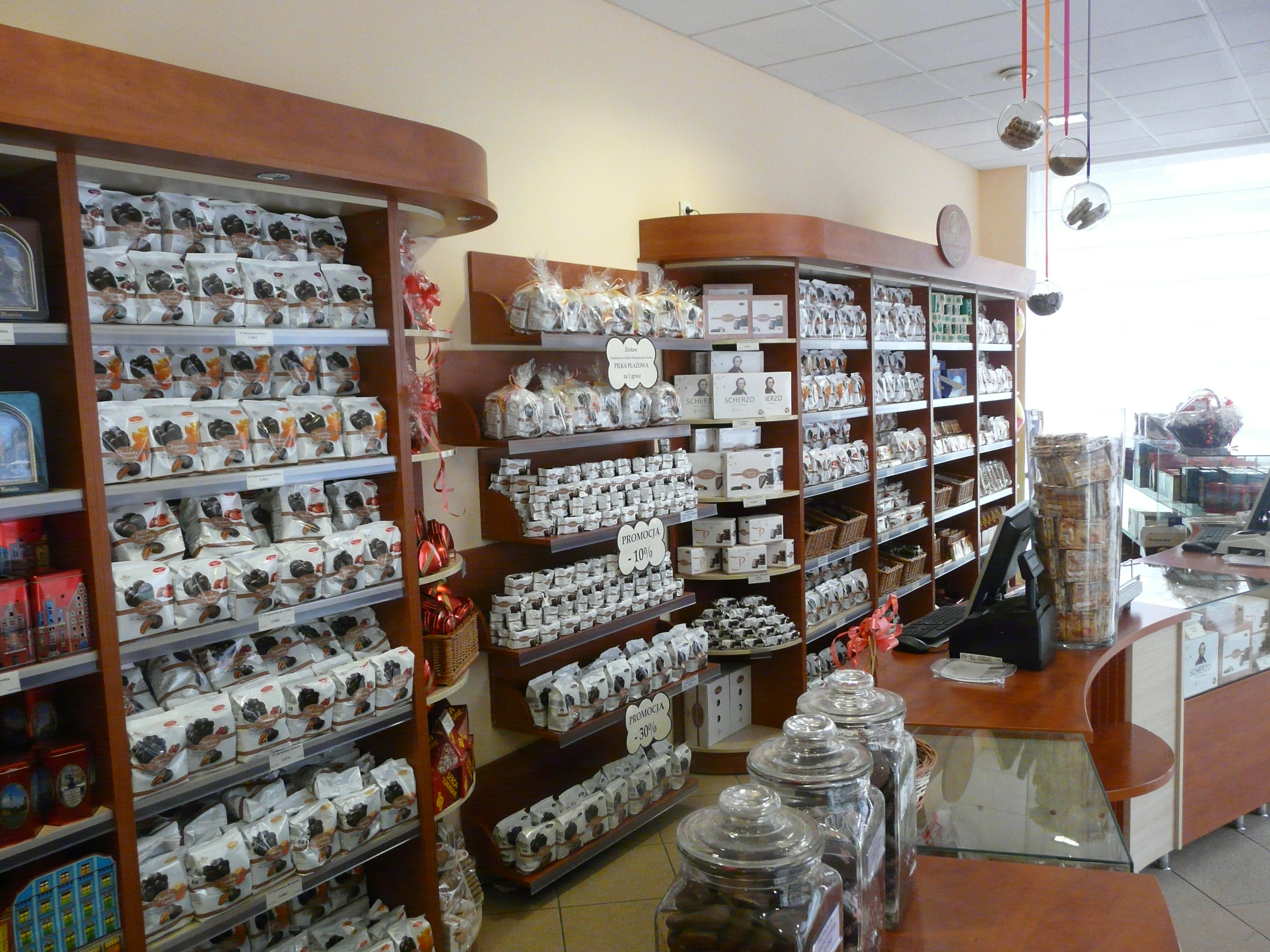
Interior of a Toruń gingerbread-dedicated shop in Poland

There are two main producers of Toruń gingerbread: the confectionery factory "Kopernik" S.A., and the Toruń Bakery. The first upholds its legal rights to the brand name and is the successor to a company that was founded in 1763 by Johann Weese. The second company was formed by Toruń bakers who specialized in producing gingerbread; its aim is to spread knowledge of the craft and to produce fine gingerbread for restaurants, parties and elite meetings.

== See also ==
- List of desserts
- List of Polish desserts
- District Museum in Toruń
- Muzeum Piernika
- Lebkuchen (Nuremberg)
