= Artus Court, Toruń =

Coordinates: 53°00′36″N 18°36′16″E

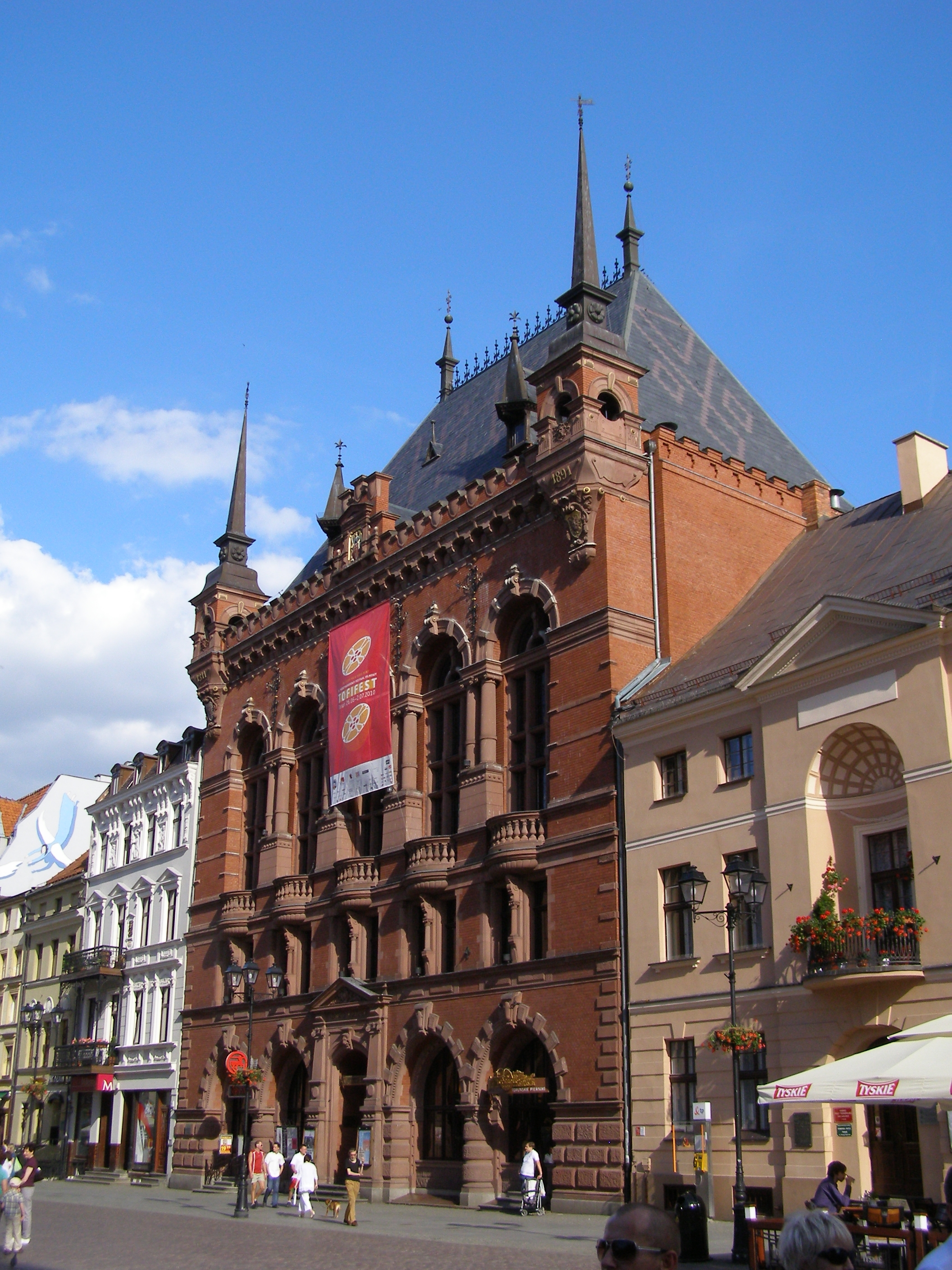
Artus Court

The Artus Court is a building located in Toruń, Poland. Built in 1889–1891, it houses a local government institution, the Cultural Centre, established in 1995. It is located in the Old Town complex, at Rynek Staromiejski 6.

== History ==
The building takes up the place of three medieval parcels. The first Artus Manor, which was actually called "The Public House/Meeting House" or "The Club House" (the name Artus Manor emerged only at the beginning of the 17th century) was built in the years 1385–1386. In 1466 the Second Peace of Thorn was signed here. The building was later reconstructed and renovated, especially in the 17th century, when a rich painting decoration of the facade was made, on which friezes with images of kings from Władysław Jagiełło to Sigismund III Vasa were placed, known from a series of drawings created in the years 1738–1745 showing views of Toruń and the surrounding area prepared by Steiner. The ground floor room was also rebuilt, where, among other things, white and red marble slabs were laid on the floor.

On 14 June 1802, the Prussian authorities began the demolition of the medieval building. It was not until May 1826 that the construction of the second Artus Manor, designed by Heckert, was completed. It had a modest classicist, storied, five-axis facade decorated with pilasters in great order. As a result of the liquidation of the Brotherhood of St. George in 1842, the Manor became a Municipal Theatre with an auditorium of 500 seats. The second Artus Manor and the neighbouring western tenement house were demolished in 1889.

They were replaced by the current building constructed in the years 1889–1891, designed by the town's building advisor Rudolph Schmidt, and architect Duszyński. The ground floor of the "Third Artus Manor" housed a restaurant and shops, while the first floor housed the Great, White, Small, and Red rooms, the attic was used as guest rooms.

After Poland regained its independence in 1920, the representative rooms of the Manor hosted, among others, General Jozef Haller and the Presidents of the Second Polish Republic: Stanisław Wojciechowski, Ignacy Mościcki, and Józef Piłsudski. Traditional state ceremonies, social and guild meetings, and representative balls returned to the Manor.

After World War II, in 1949, the building was handed over to the emerging Nicolaus Copernicus University and housed the Collegium Maximum and the Od Nowa Student Club. Since 1995 the building has been the seat of the Cultural Centre.

Between 1994 and 2015, the Artus Manor was the seat of the Toruń Symphony Orchestra.

In November 2018, the centre was enriched with a new educational space – the Cellars of Culture, where educators conduct cyclical music, art, and film workshops for children, teenagers, adults, and seniors.

On 1 January 2020, the centre was expanded to include the House of Muses and its branches.

== Architecture ==
The style of the building is defined as Dutch Neo-Renaissance. The façade is three-storey, built with brick and significant use of red sandstone (ground floor, decorative details), significantly oversized in relation to the adjacent buildings of the Market Square. Apart from neo-Renaissance motifs, there are also references to the original, Gothic-Renaissance building – sharp-edged windows and bossage on the ground floor, turrets flanking the façade, crenellation crowning the building. The structure is covered with a high, hipped roof – its silhouette is clearly visible in the skyline of Toruń.

== Gallery ==
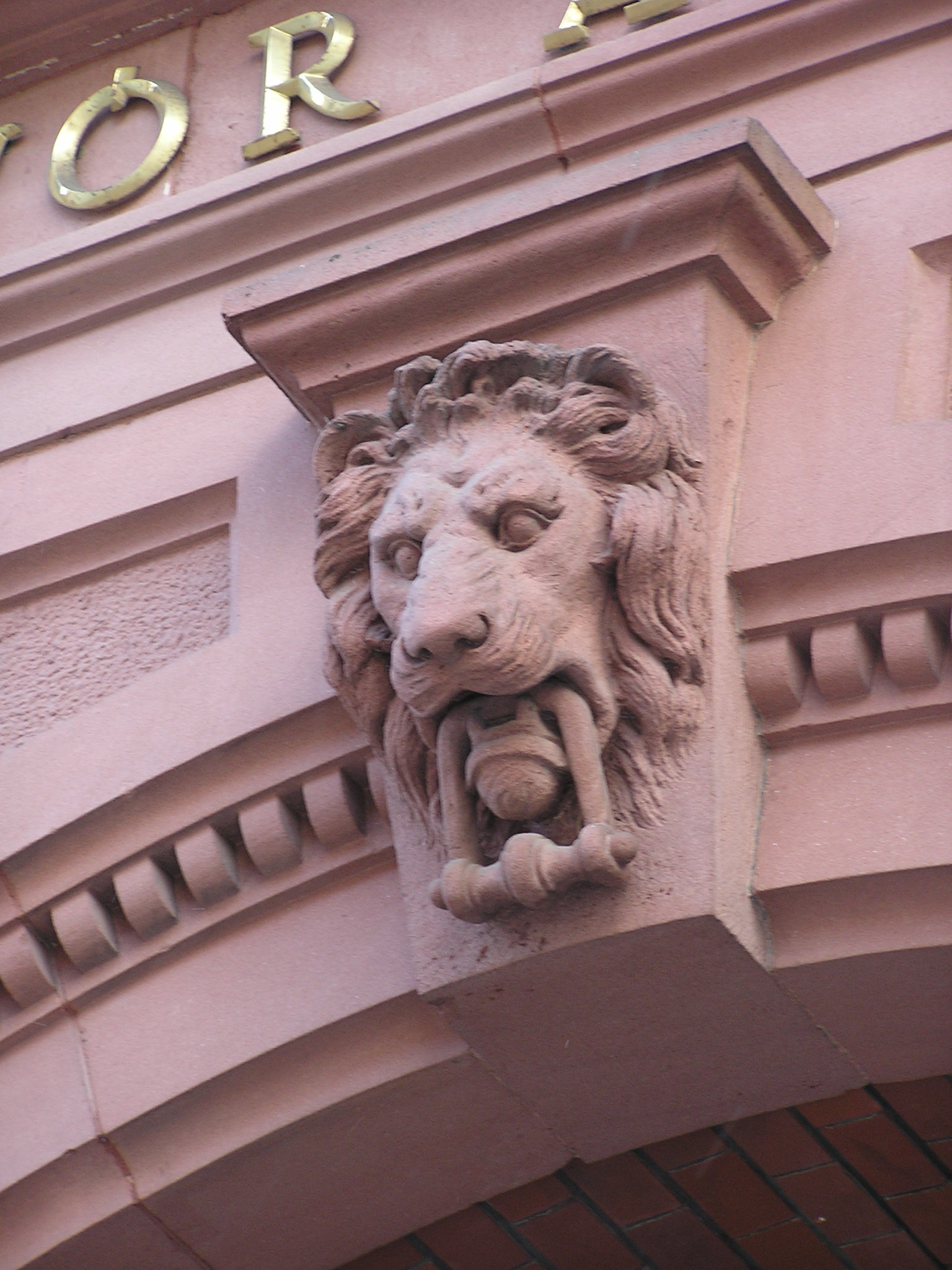
Architectural detail

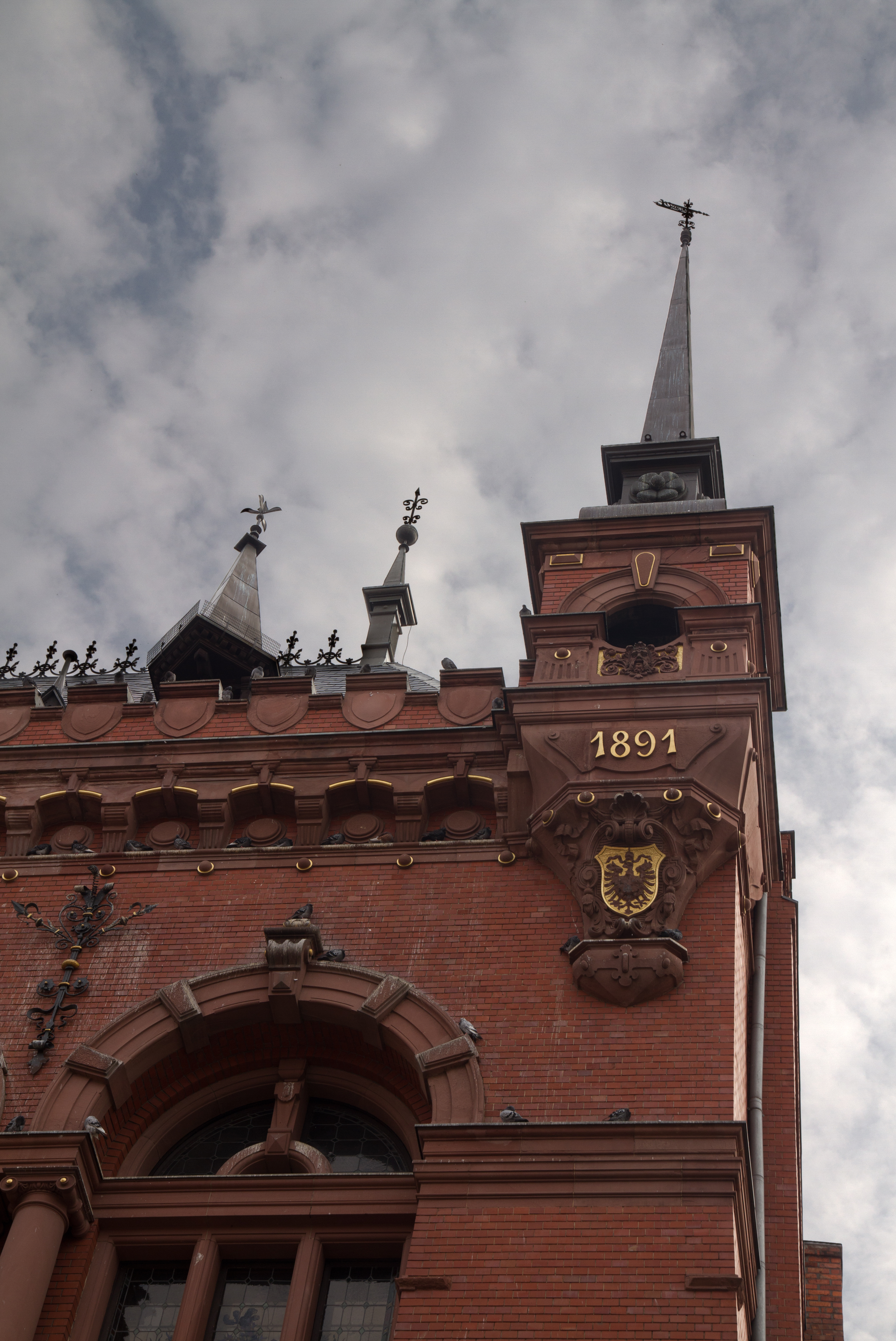
Turret with date of commissioning

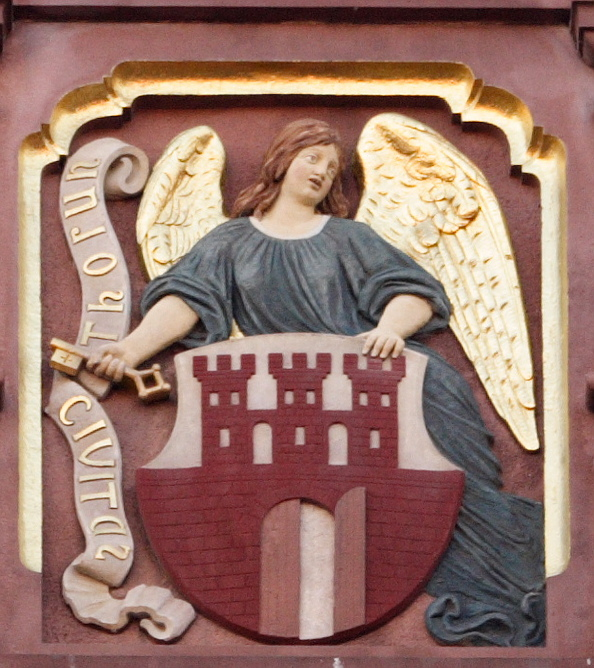
The coat of arms of Toruń on the building

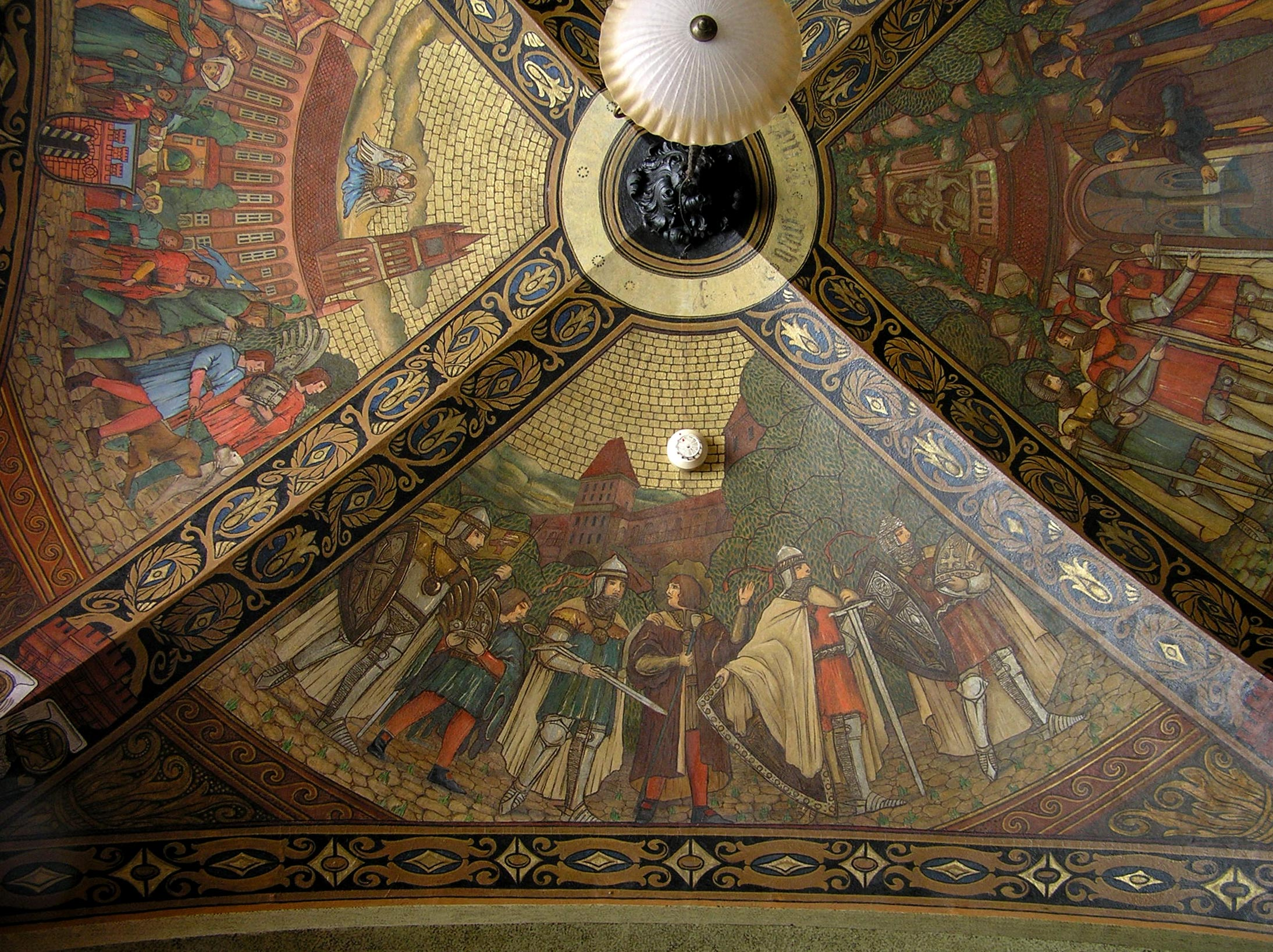
Polychromy on the ceiling of the foyer

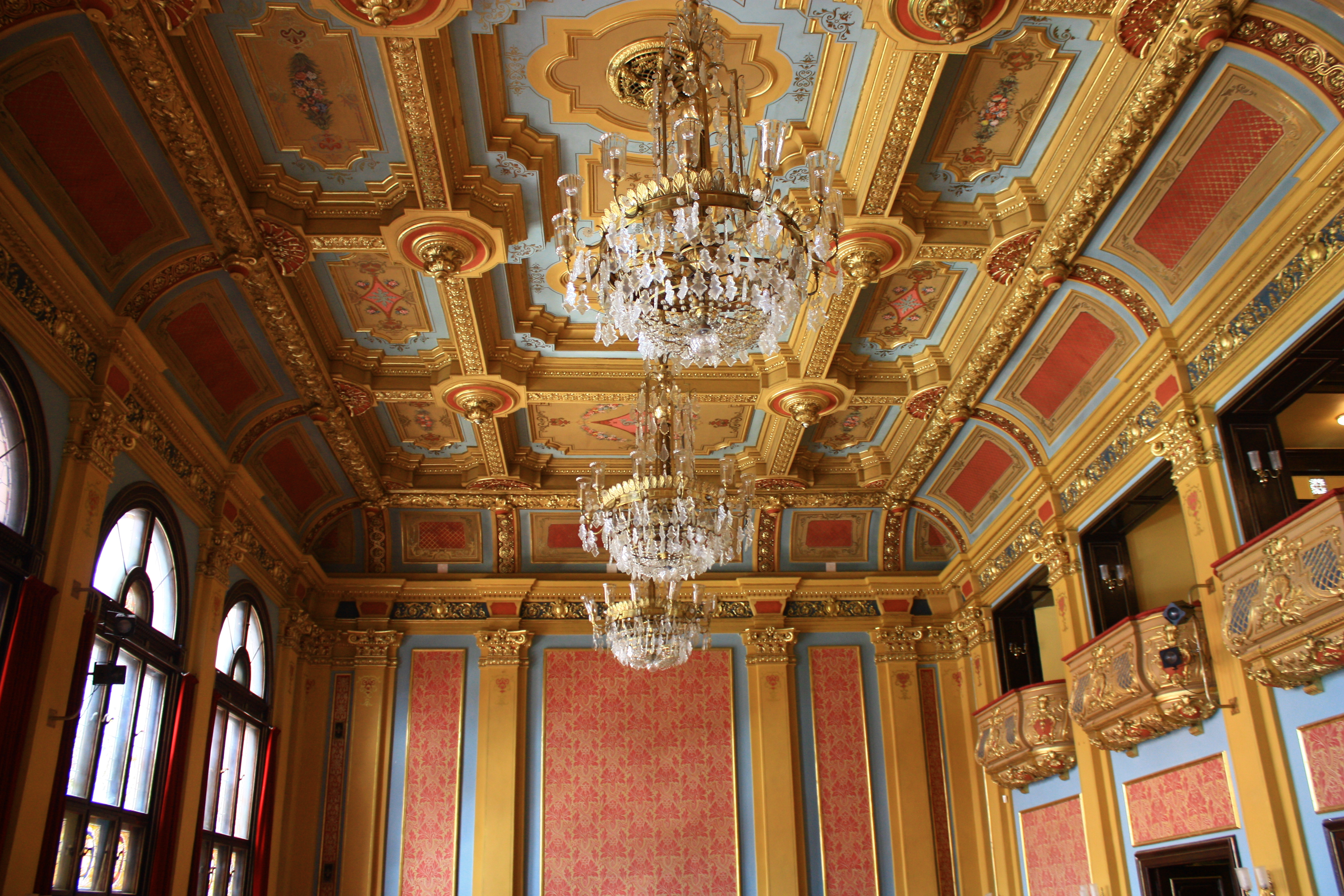
The grand hall

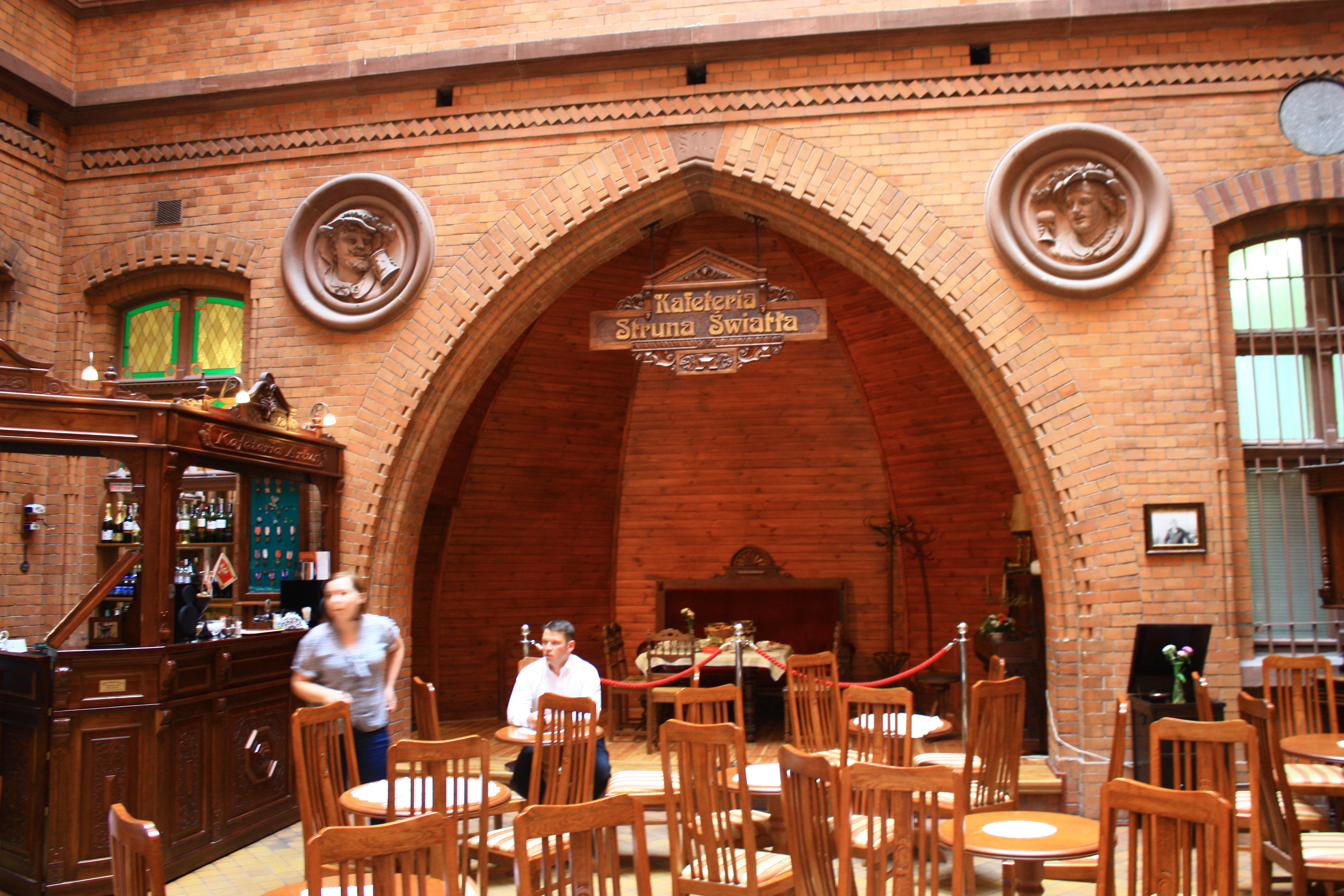
Cafeteria
