= District Museum in Toruń =

Regional museum in Toruń, Poland

Coordinates: 53°00′39″N 18°36′16″E

Toruń Regional Museum
- Muzeum Okręgowe w Toruniu
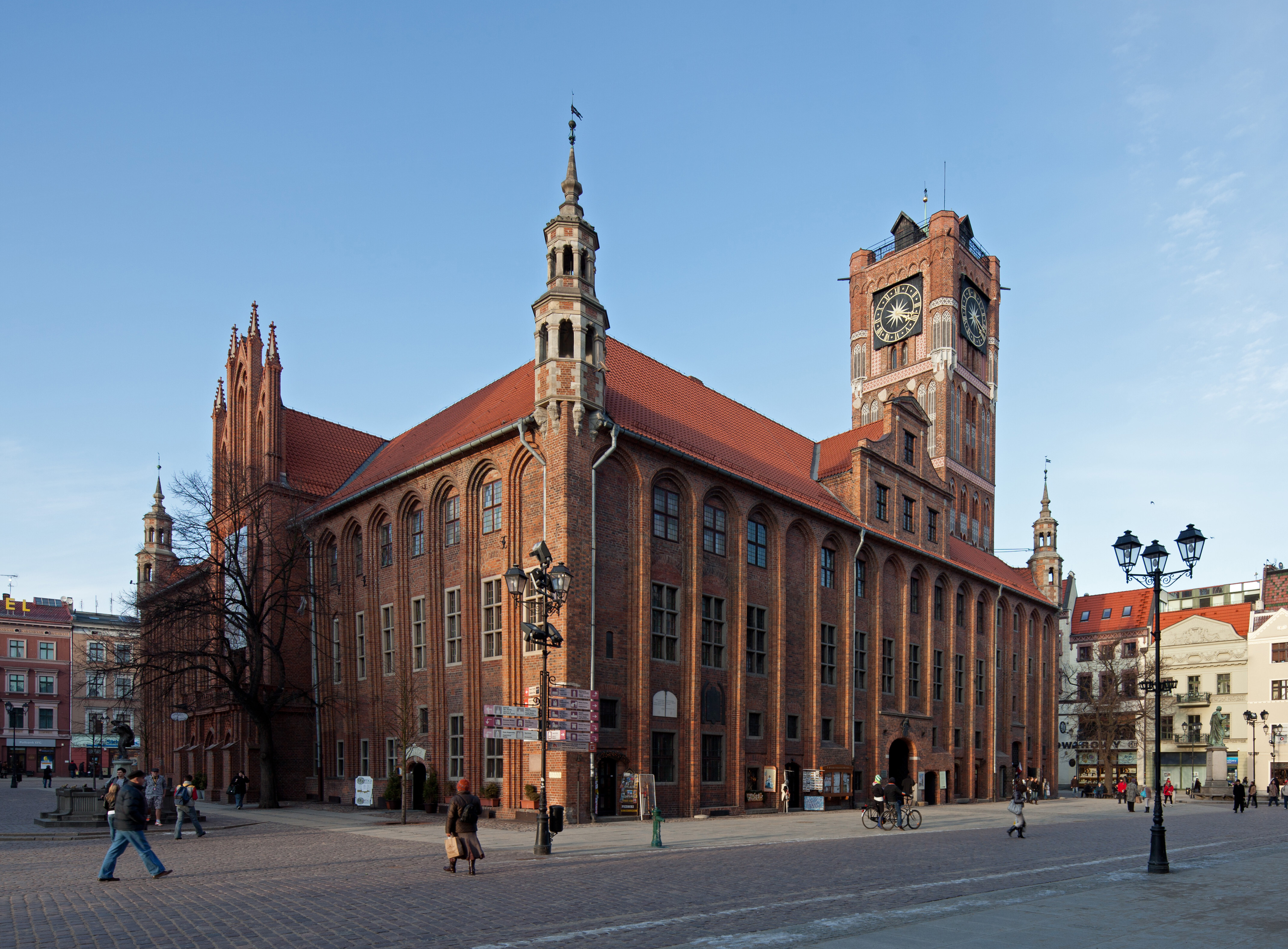
- Old Town Hall, headquarters and main branch of the museum
- Established: 1594
- Location: Toruń
- Type: Regional museum
- Director: Anna Mierzejewska (acting)
- Website: www.muzeum.torun.pl

Toruń Regional Museum (Polish: Muzeum Okręgowe w Toruniu), located in the Ratusz hall of Toruń, is one of the oldest and largest museums in Poland. It started in 1594 as the mere Cabinet of Curiosities at the library of the academic Gimnazjum, called Musaeum in Latin. Re-established in sovereign Poland as a city museum in 1920 after the century of military partitions, it was administratively structured as the regional museum in 1965.

== Departments ==
The Museum consists of 7 departments.

The headquarters and main department of the museum is located in the Old Town Hall. It is divided into:

- Skrwilno and Nieszawa Treasure
- Court Room (XVI-XVII century)
- Gothic Art Room (painting, sculpture)
- Old Toruń: History and Crafts (from 1233 to 1793)
- Sacral Art of Modern Toruń
- The Mieszczańska Room with one of the earliest portraits of Nicolaus Copernicus
- The Royal Hall
- Gallery of Polish Art
- Gallery of Polish Art (after 1945)
- Militaria (from antiquity to the twentieth century)
- Archaeological exhibition (from 1100 BC to 1300 BC)
- Temporary exhibitions

Other departments are:

- Copernicus House at the birthplace and childhood home of the famed astronomer at Kopernika 15/17 Street
- Museum of History of Toruń in the Esken House (Dom Eskenów) at Łazienna 16 Street
- Museum of Toruń Gingerbread at Strumykowa 4
- Toruń Fortress Museum at Wały Generała Sikorskiego 23/25 Street
- Museum of Far Eastern Art in the House Under the Star (Kamienica Pod Gwiazdą) at Rynek Staromiejski 35
- Tony Halik Museum of Travelers at Franciszkańska 9/11 Street
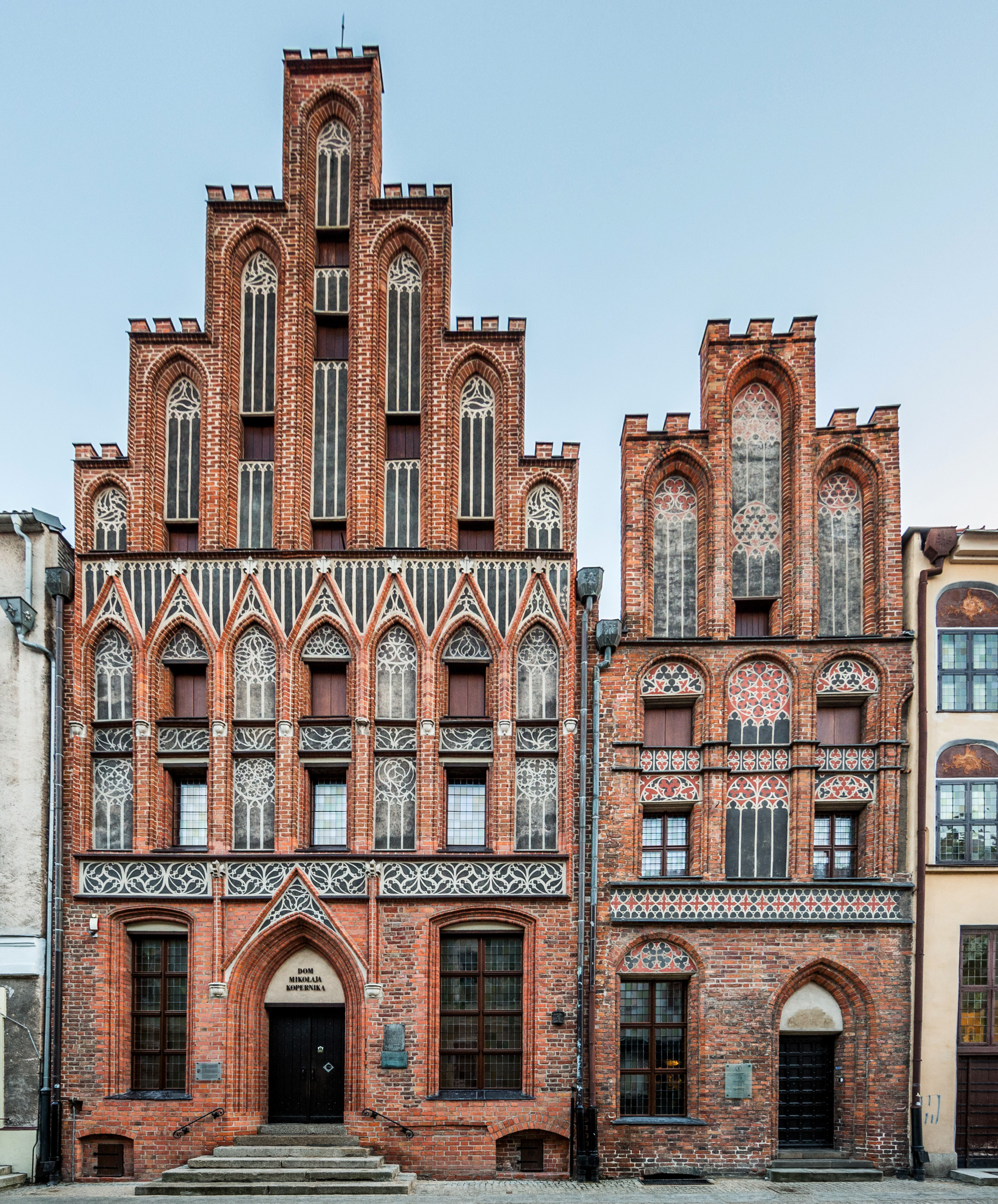
Copernicus House

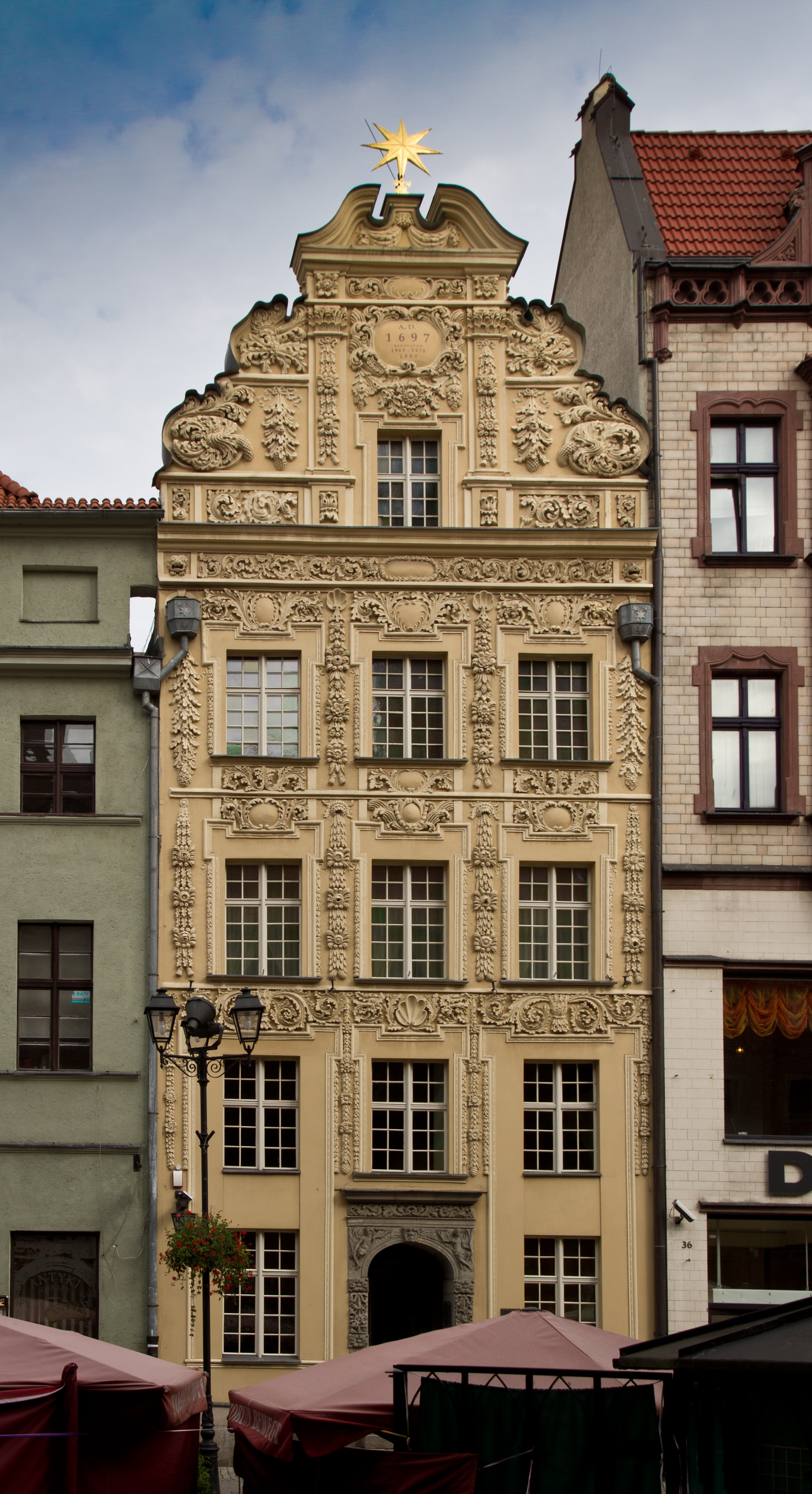
Kamienica Pod Gwiazdą

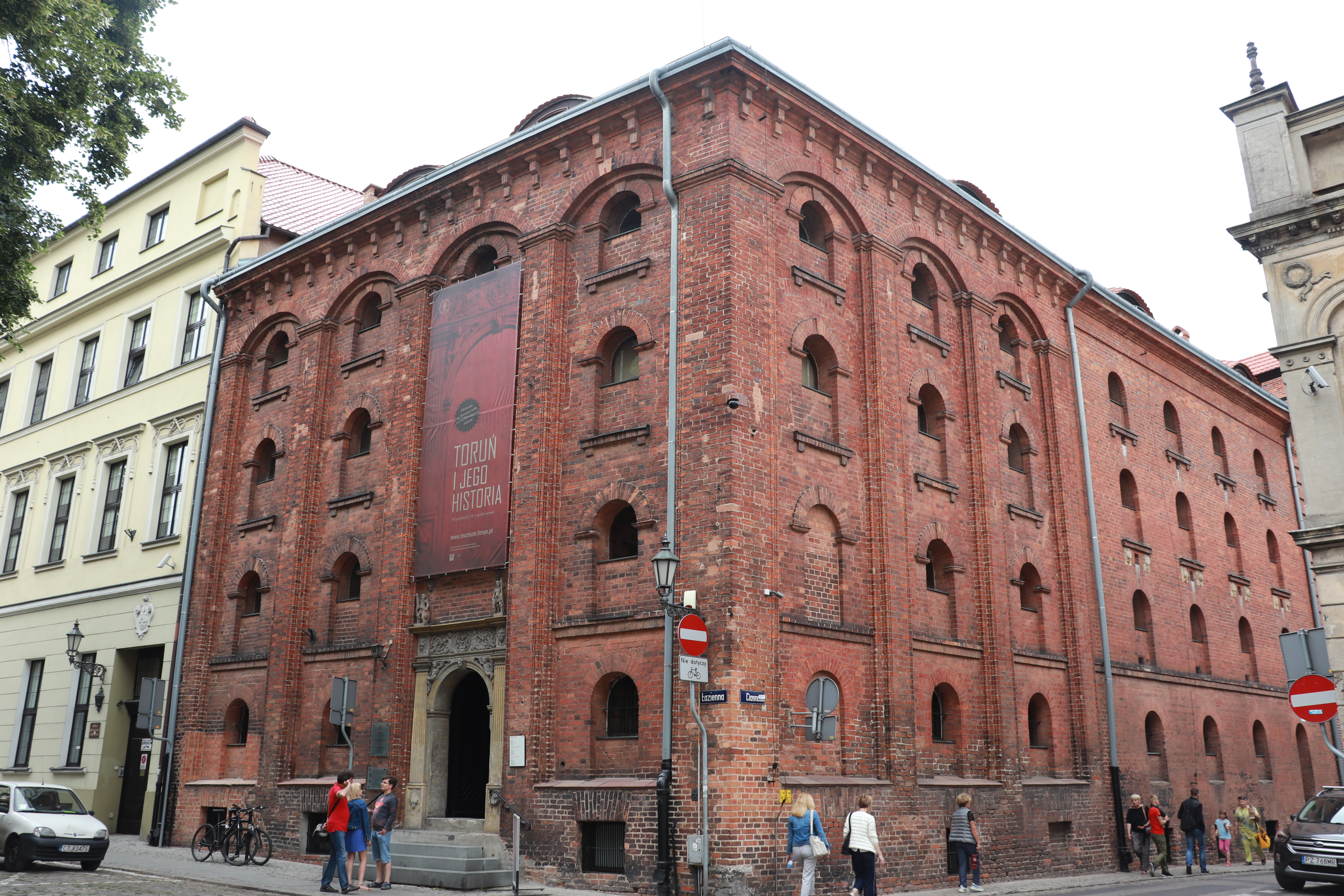
Dom Eskenów

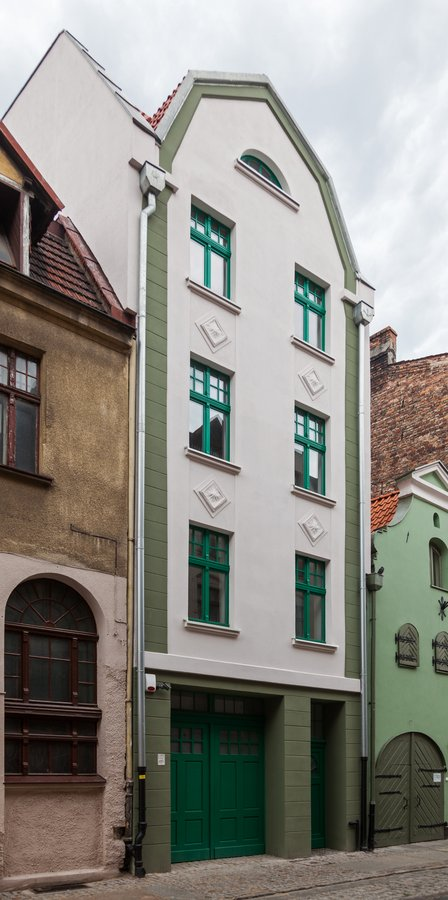
Tony Halik Museum of Travelers

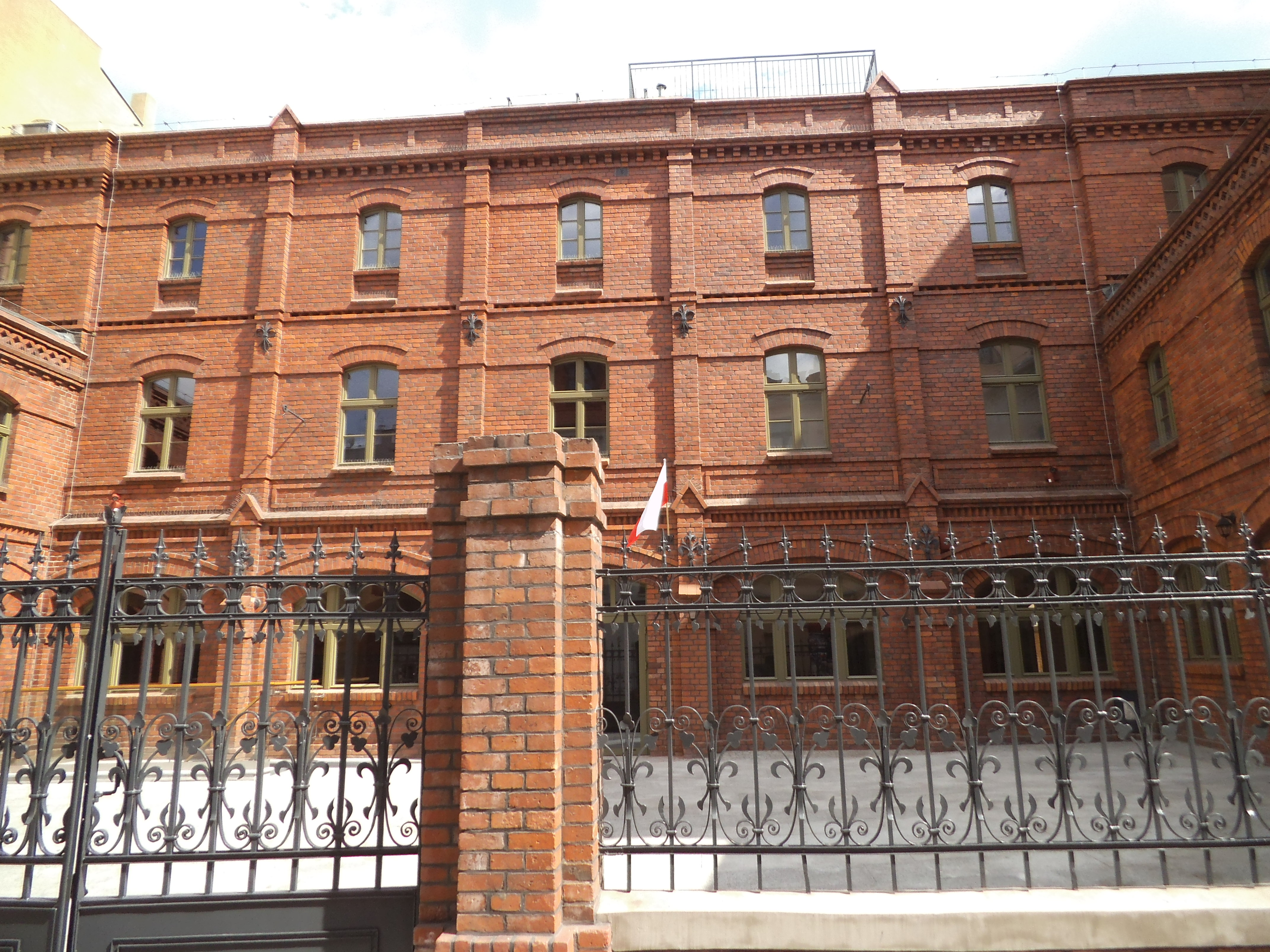
Museum of Toruń Gingerbread

== Collection ==
The Museum's holdings include works by Marcello Bacciarelli, Artur Grottger, Piotr Michałowski, Juliusz Kossak, Józef Brandt, Jan Matejko, Henryk Rodakowski, Józef Chełmoński, Julian Fałat, Leon Wyczółkowski, Stanisław Wyspiański, Jacek Malczewski, Stanisław Ignacy Witkiewicz, Wojciech Weiss, Józef Mehoffer, Konrad Krzyżanowski, Ferdynand Ruszczyc, Jan Cybis, Zbigniew Pronaszko, Piotr Potworowski, Antoni Fałat, Edward Dwurnik, Zdzisław Beksiński, and Jerzy Duda-Gracz.

=== Gallery ===
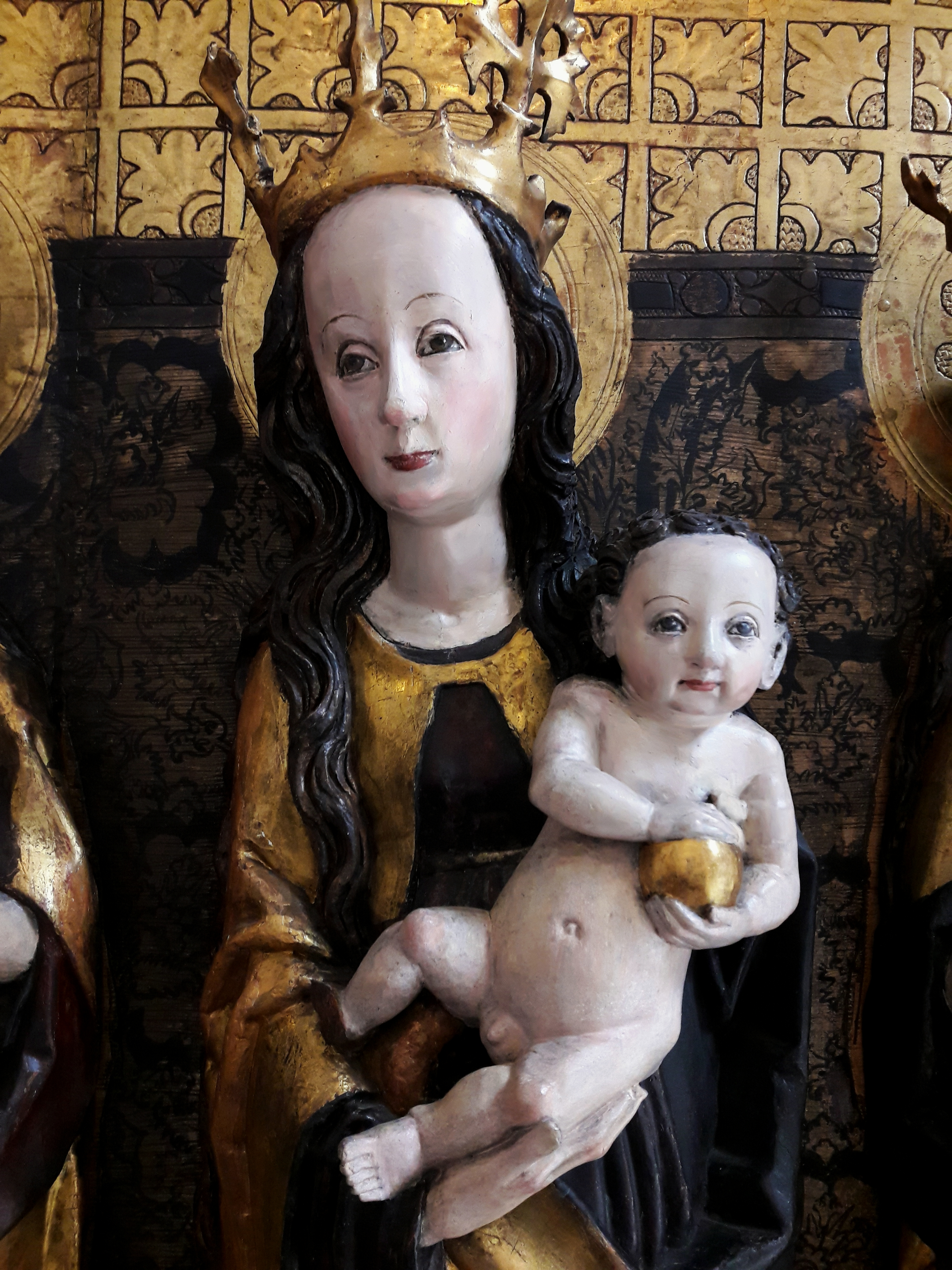
Retable with Virgin Mary, St. Barbara and St. Catherine, Master of the Góra Passion, after 1510

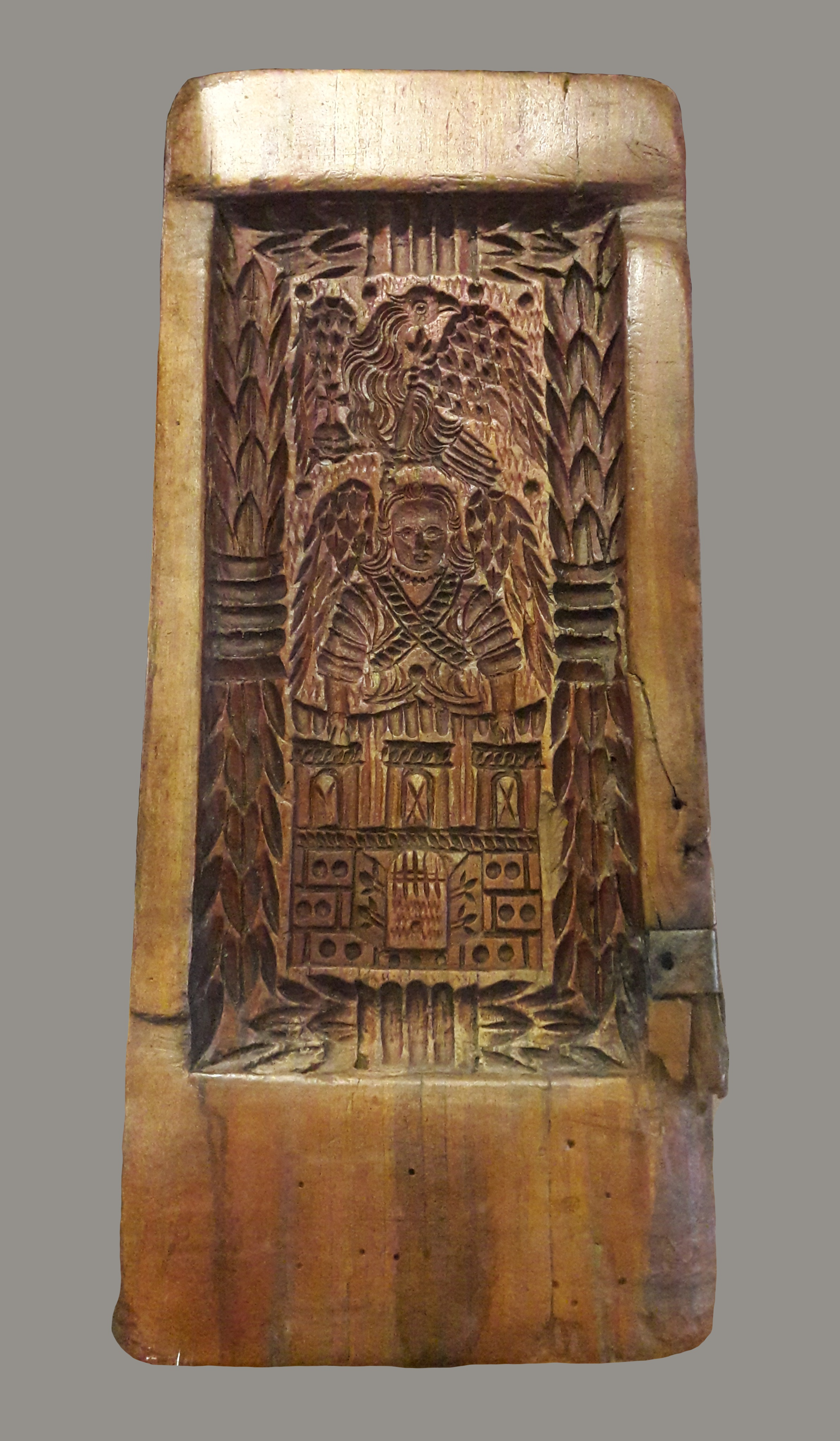
Toruń Gingerbread baking mould with city's coat of arms, 17th century

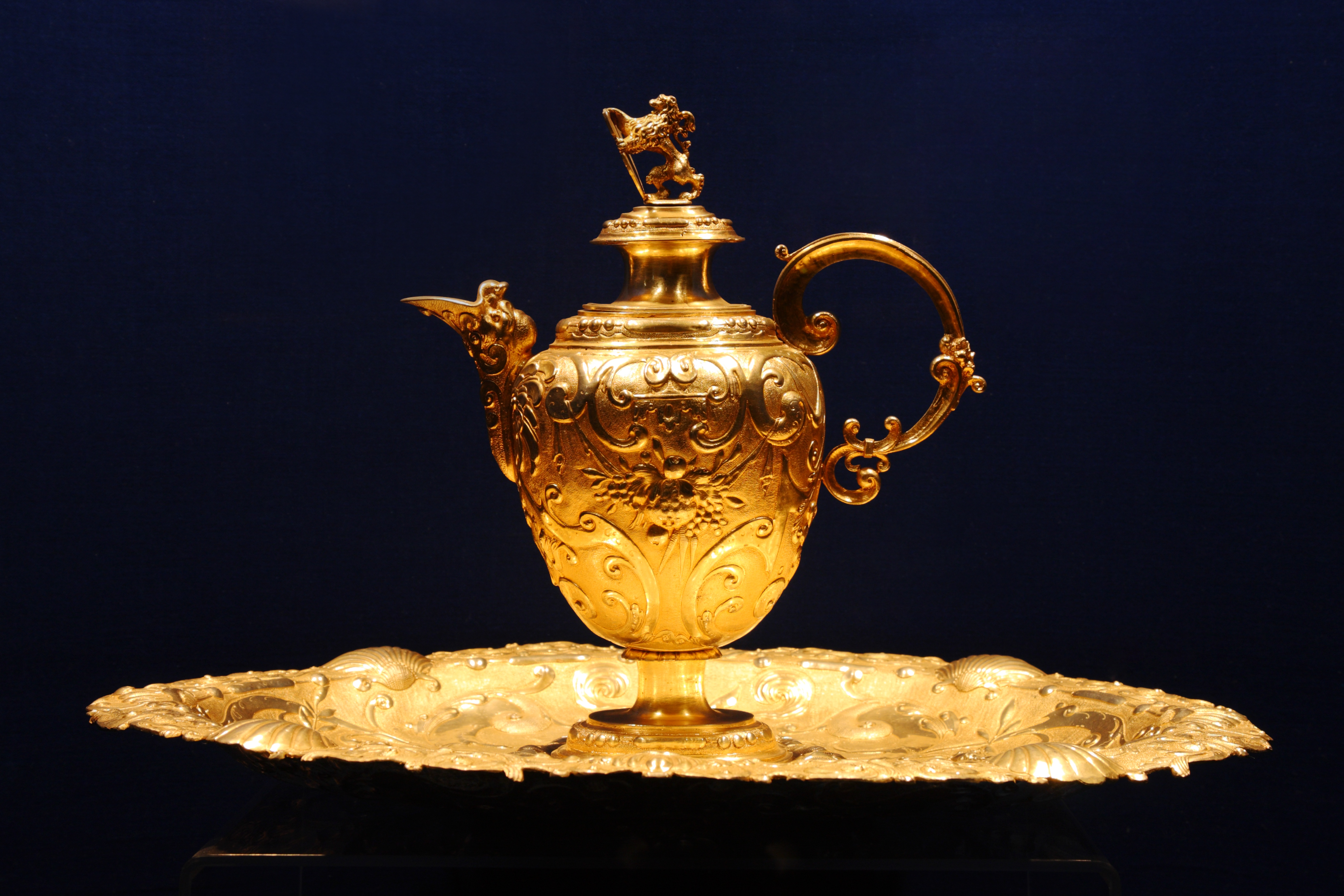
Skrwilno and Nieszawa Treasure, between 1615 and 1617

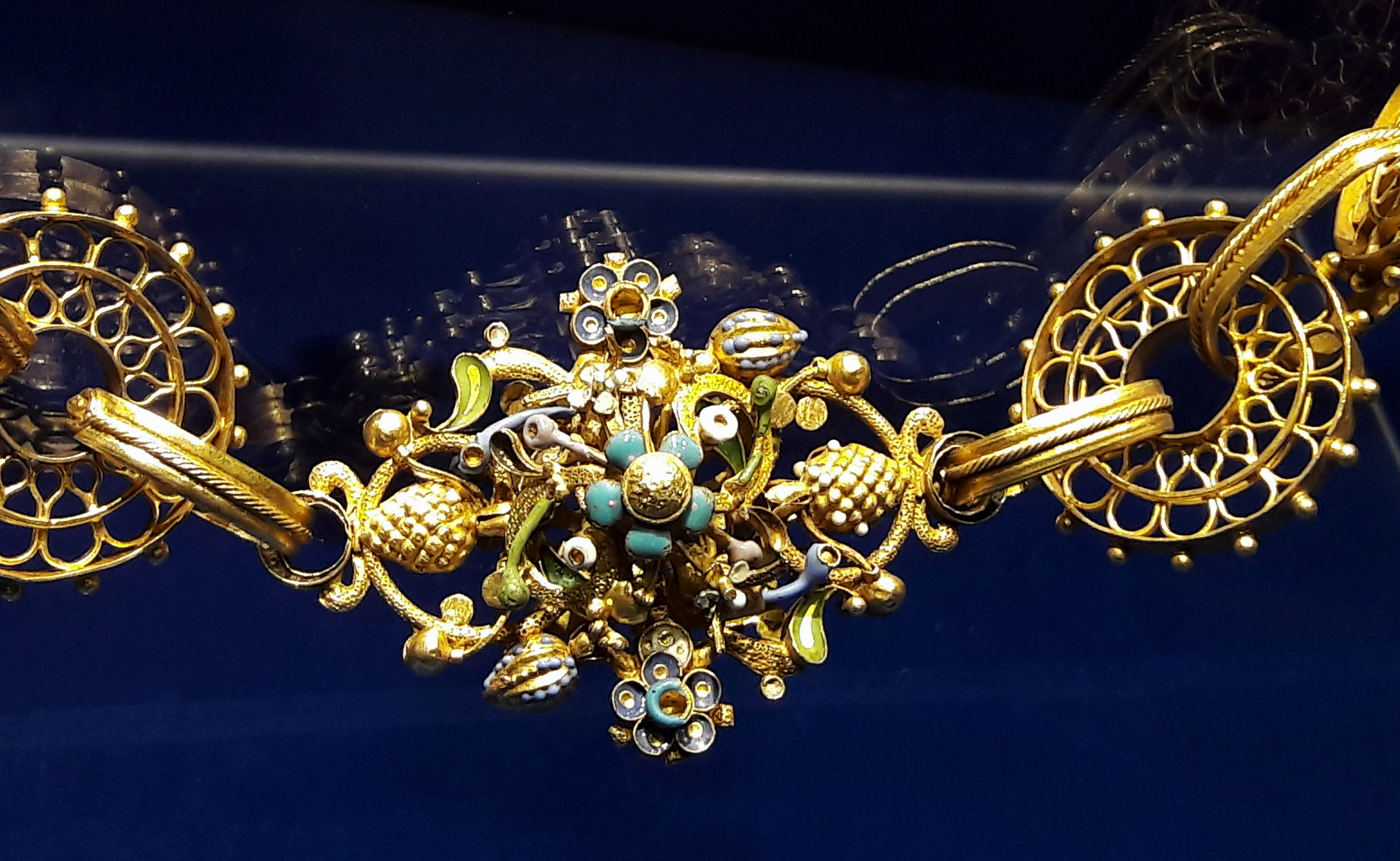
Skrwilno and Nieszawa Treasure, circa 1600

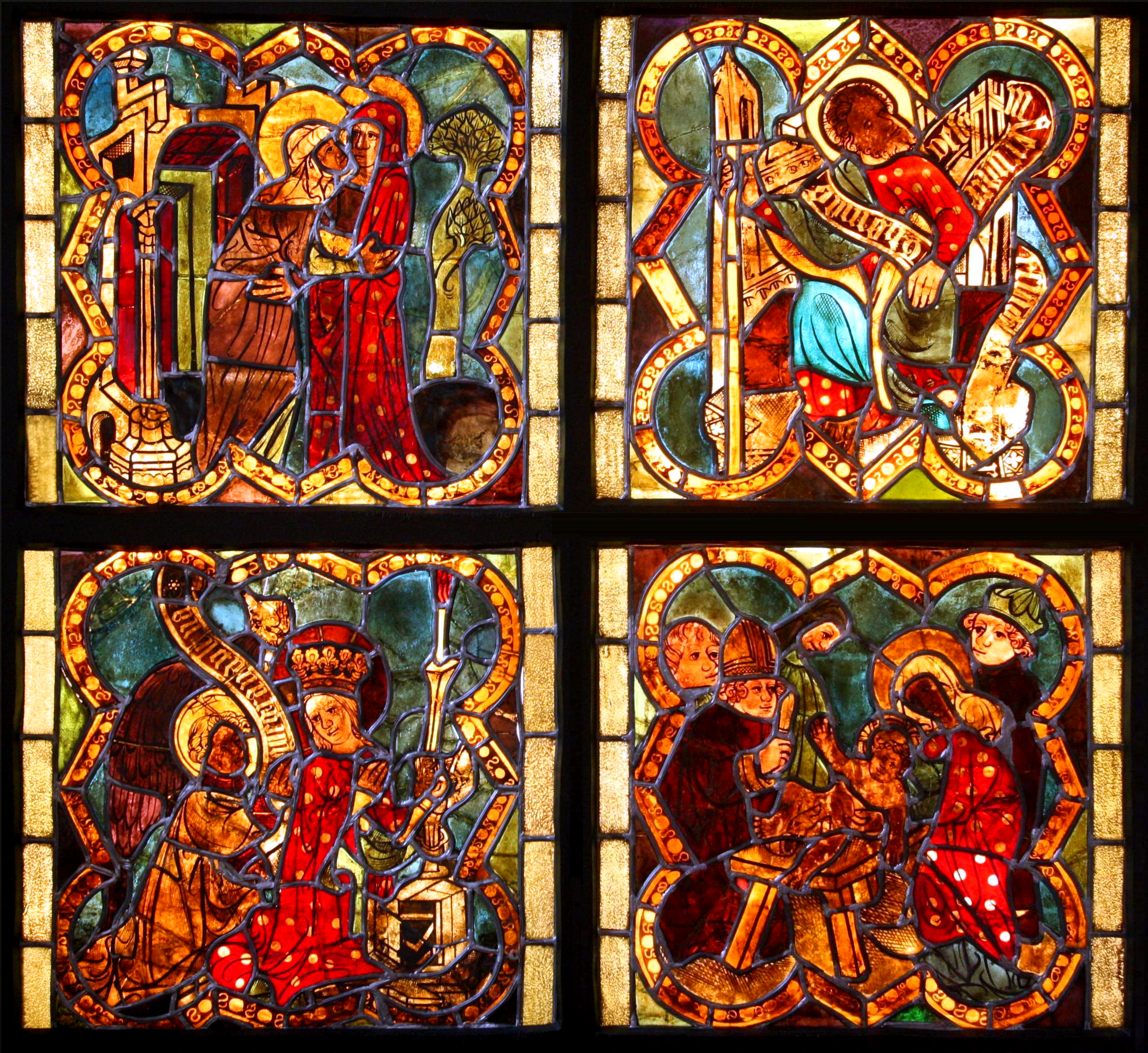
Gothic stained glasses from St. Mary Church in Chełmno, XIV century

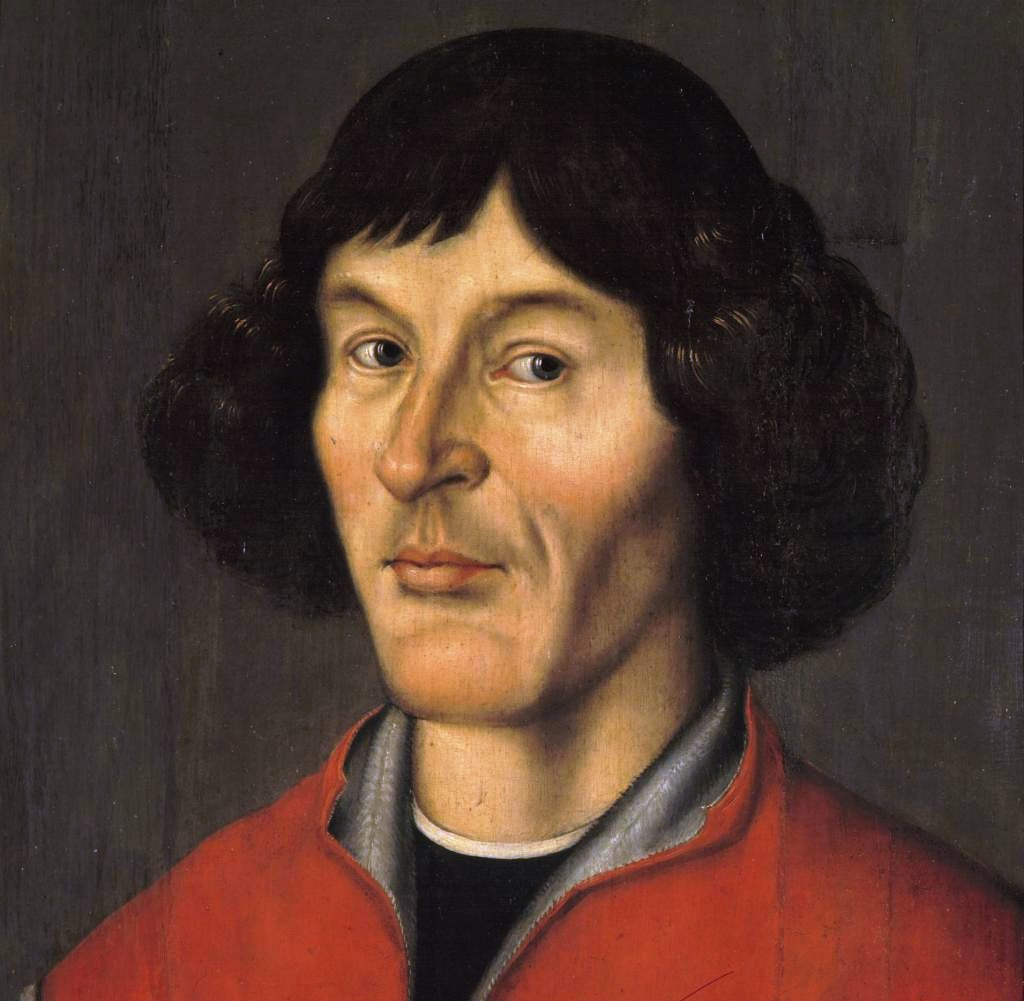
The Torun Portrait of Nicolaus Copernicus (anonymous, c. 1580), kept in the Town Hall (Note: The oldest known portrait of Copernicus is that on Strasbourg astronomical clock, made by Tobias Stimmer c. 1571–74. According to the inscription next to the portrait, it was made from a self-portrait by Copernicus himself. This has led to speculation that the Torun portrait may be a copy based on the same self-portrait, but its provenance is unknown.)

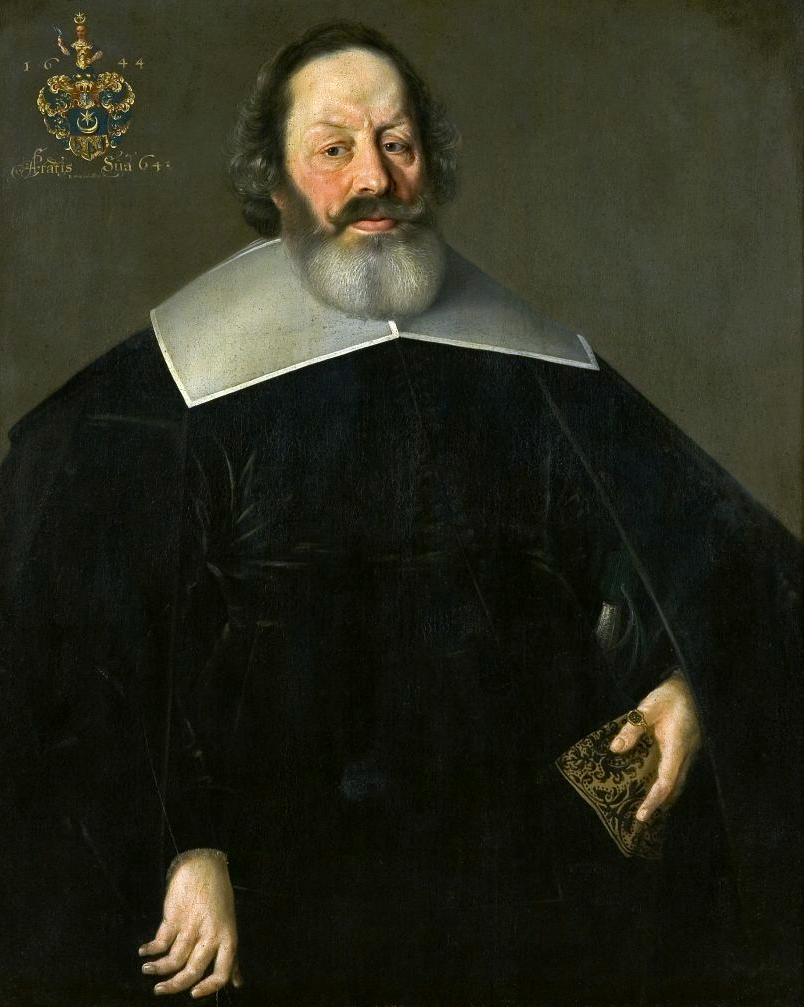
Portrait of Nikolaus Hübner, Counsellor of Thorn, Bartlomiej Strobel, 1644

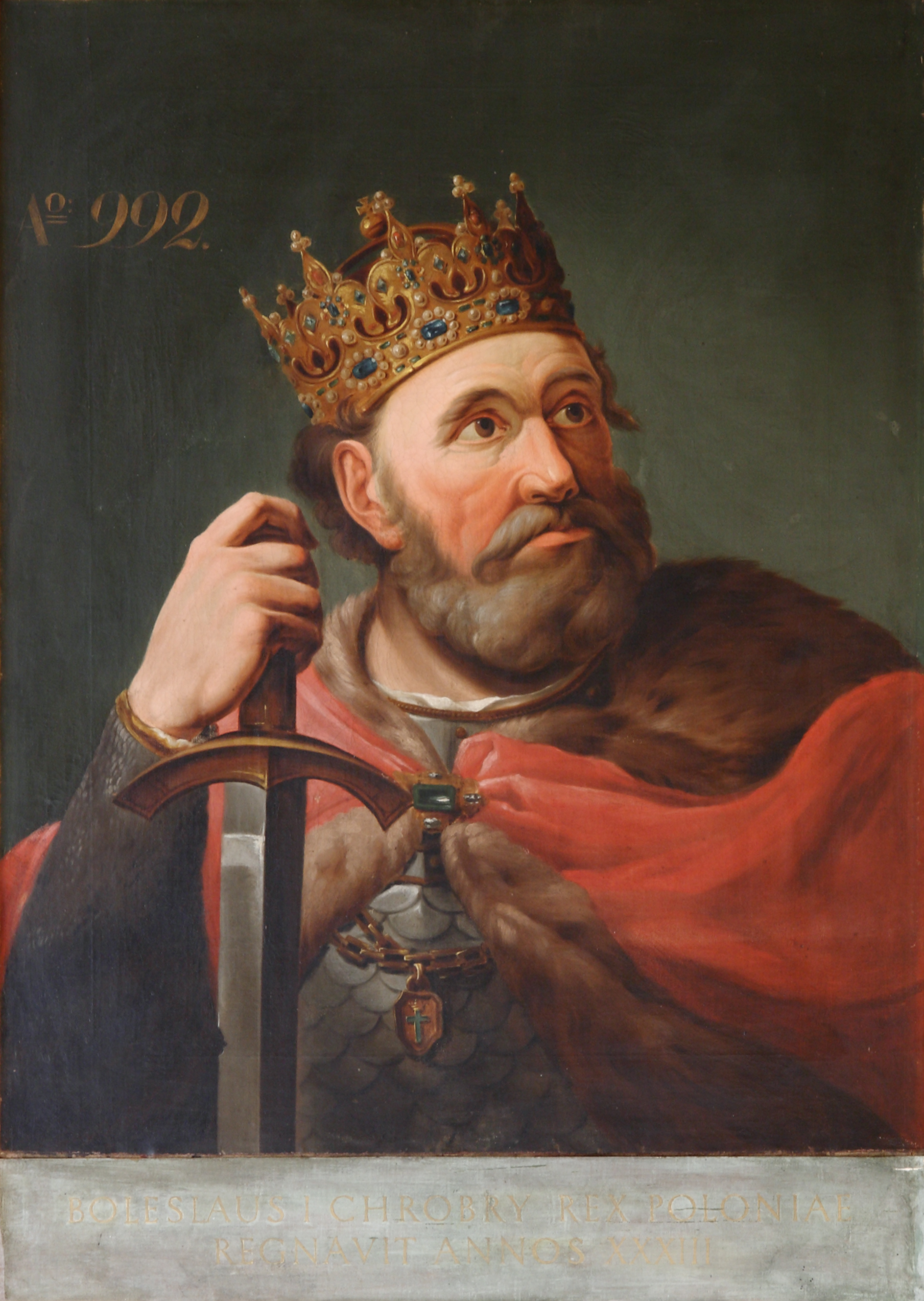
King Boleslaus I of Poland, Jan Bogumił Jacobi, 1828

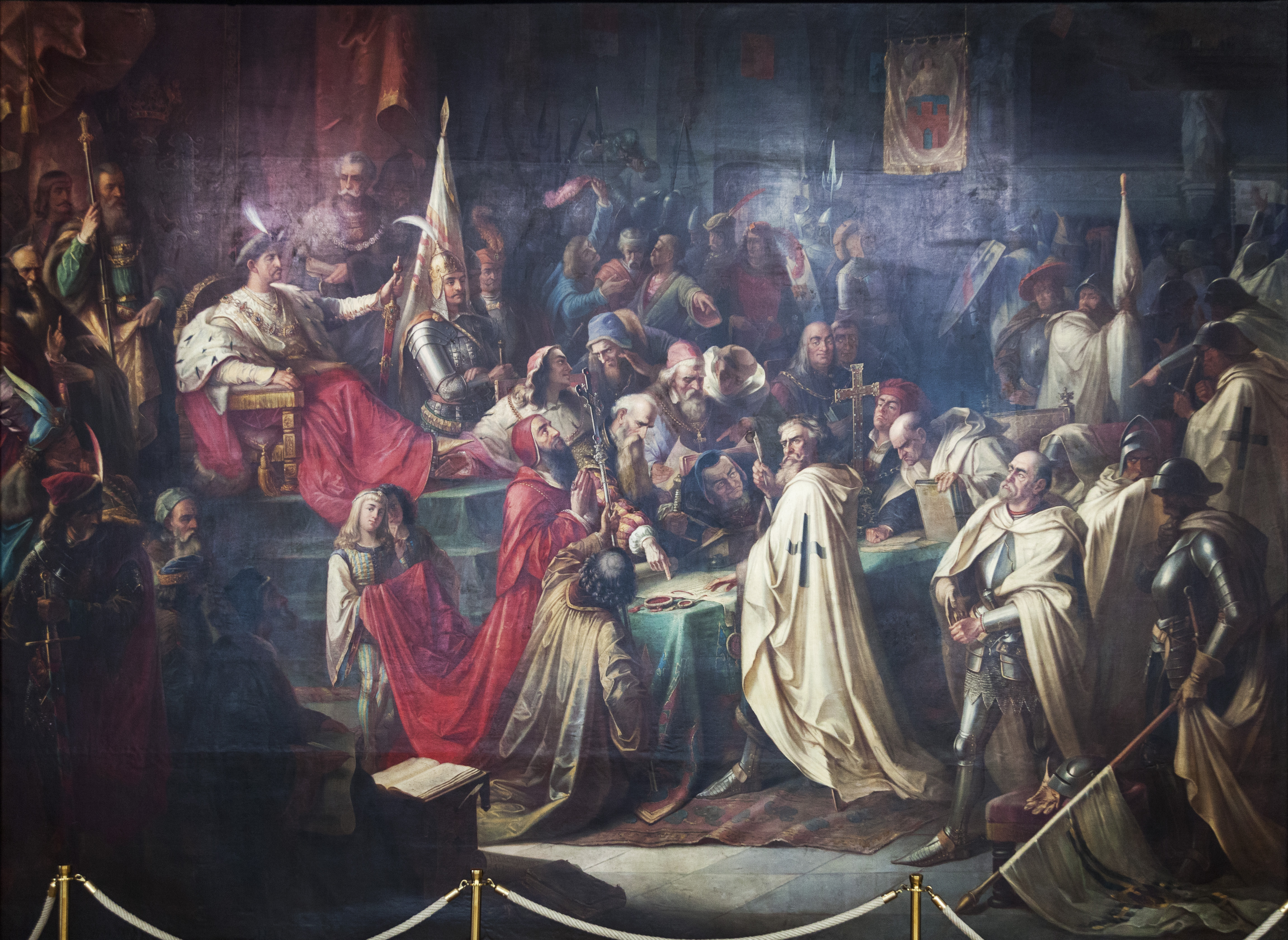
Second Peace of Toruń, Marian Jaroczyński, 1873

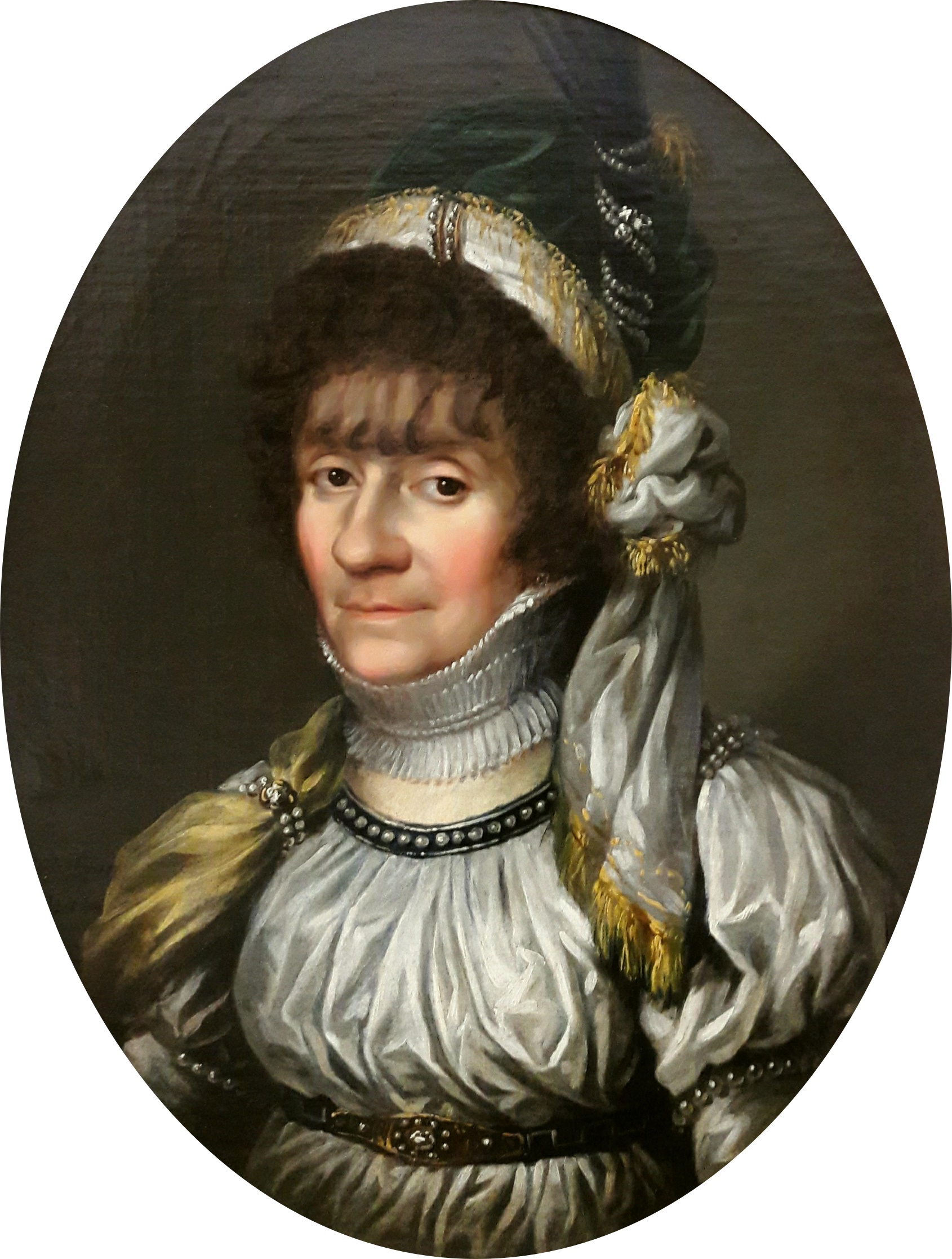
Portrait of an Old Lady by Kazimierz Wojniakowski

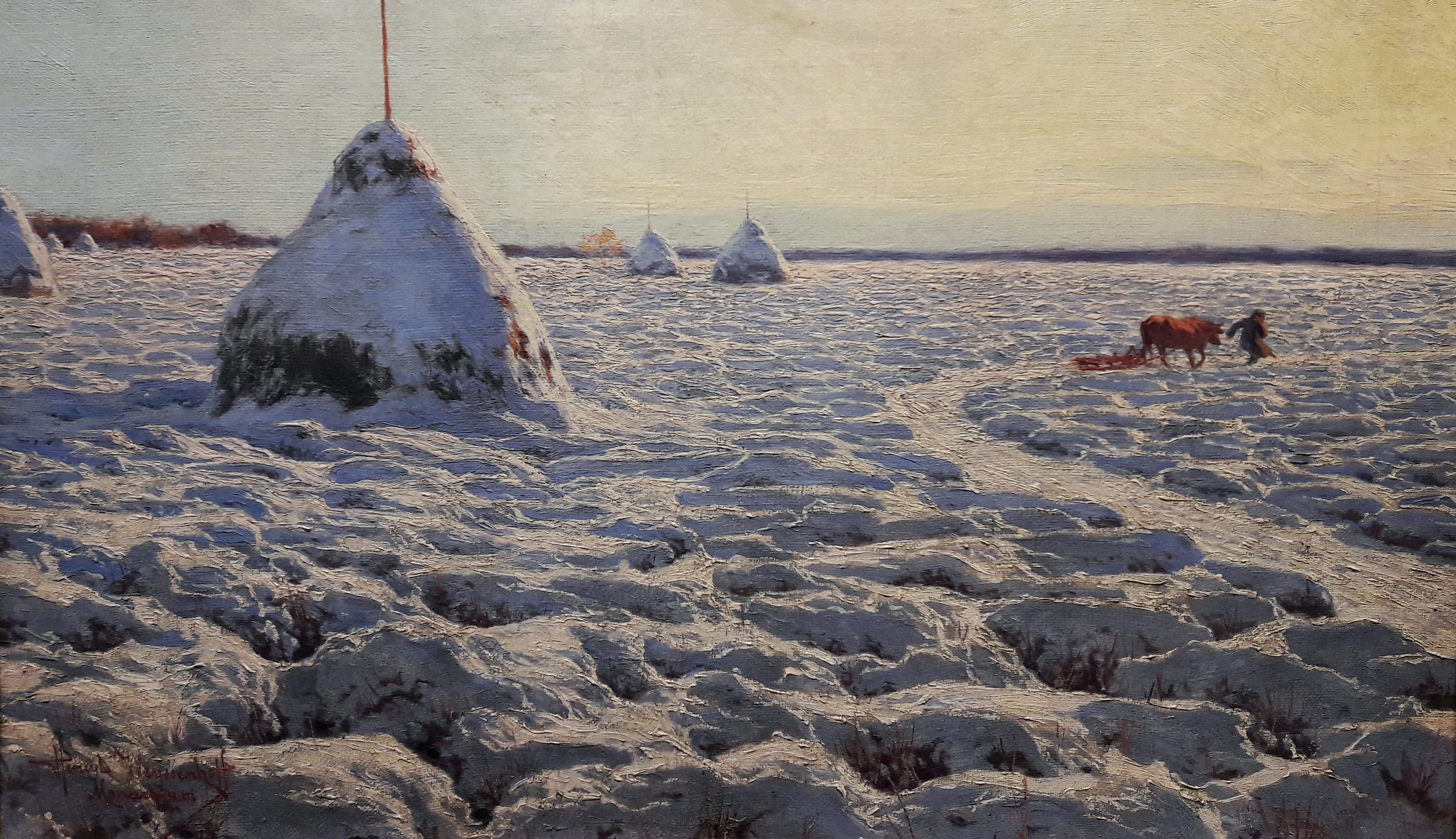
Lithuanian Swamps Under Snow by Henryk Weyssenhoff

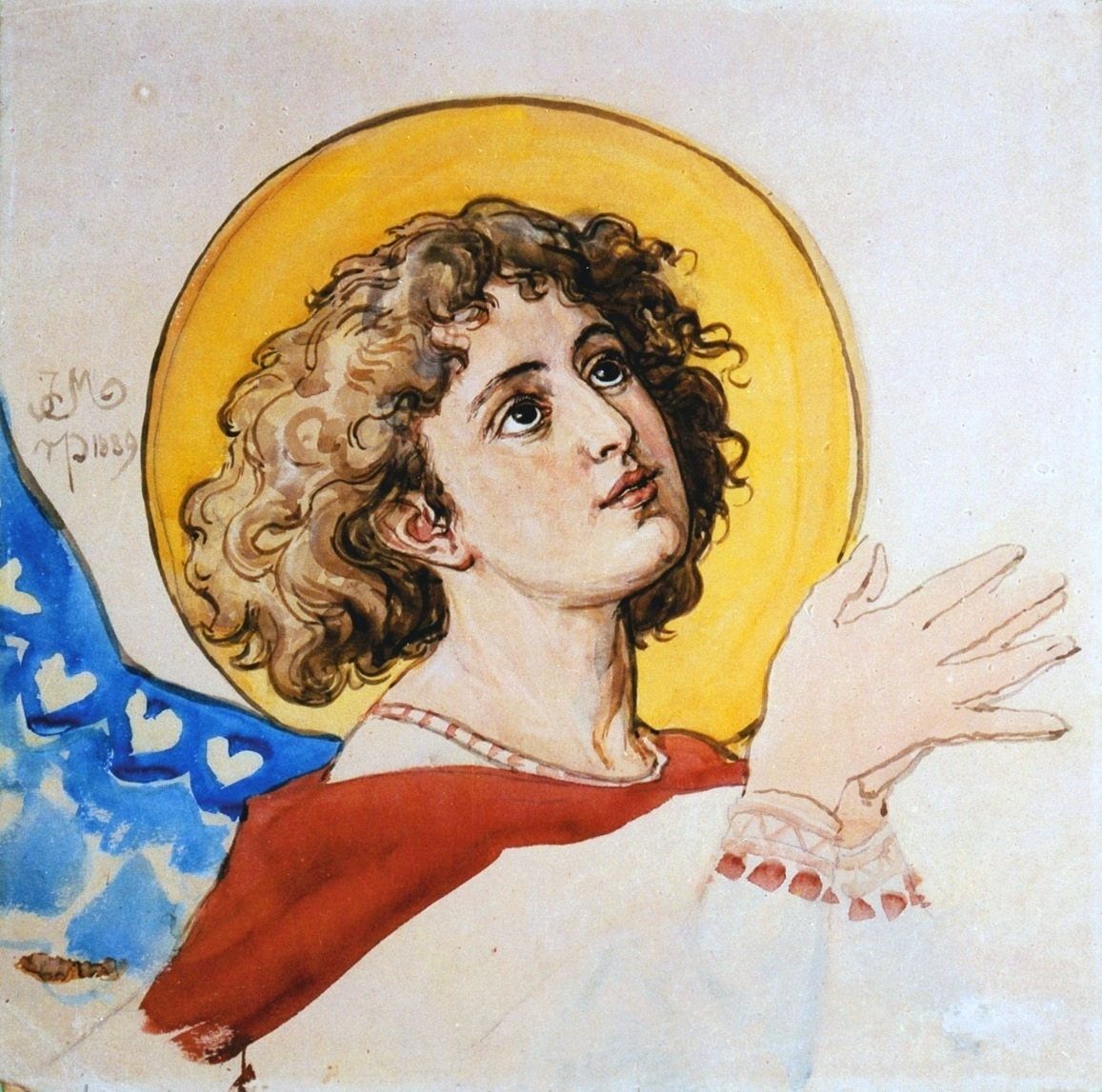
Angel, Jan Matejko, 1889

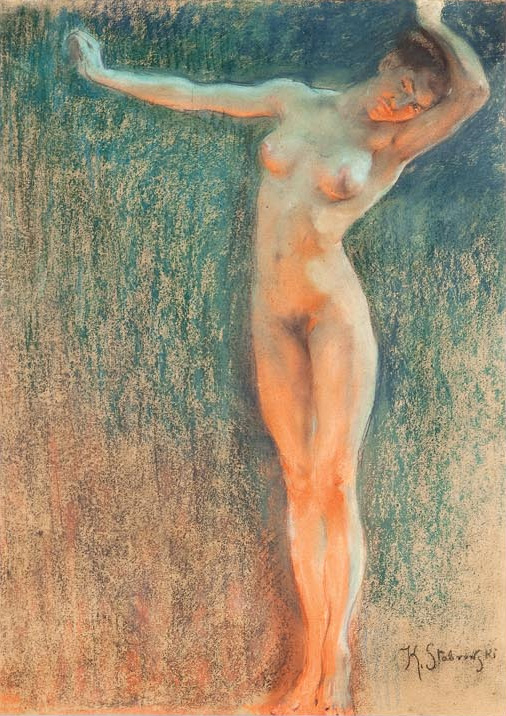
Julia Janiszewska, Kazimierz Stabrowski, 1902

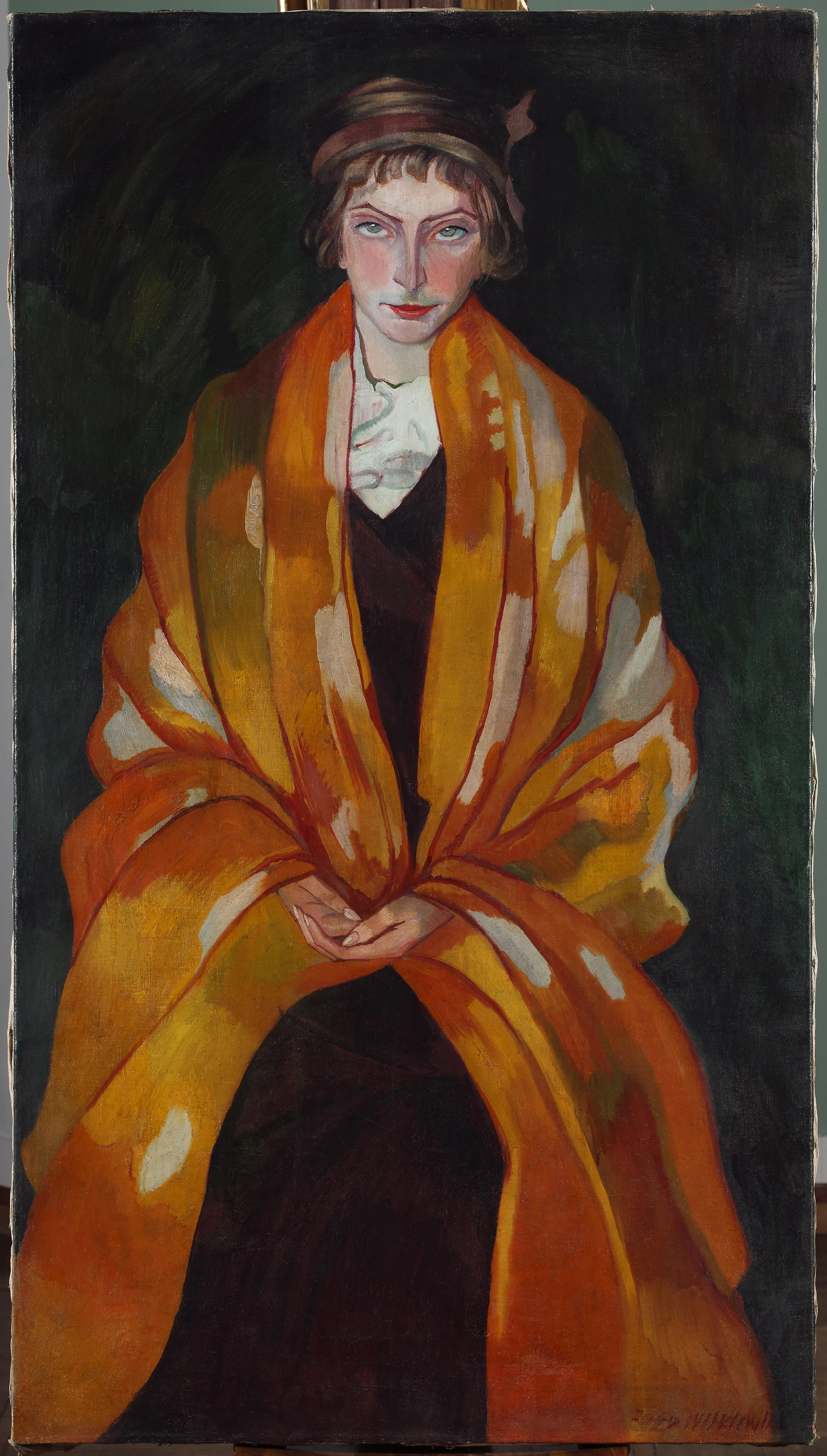
Portrait of Eugenia Dunin-Borkowska, Stanisław Ignacy Witkiewicz, 1913

== See also ==
- National Museum of Poland
- Ministry of Culture and National Heritage (Poland)
- Centre Of Contemporary Art in Torun
