= List of leaning towers =

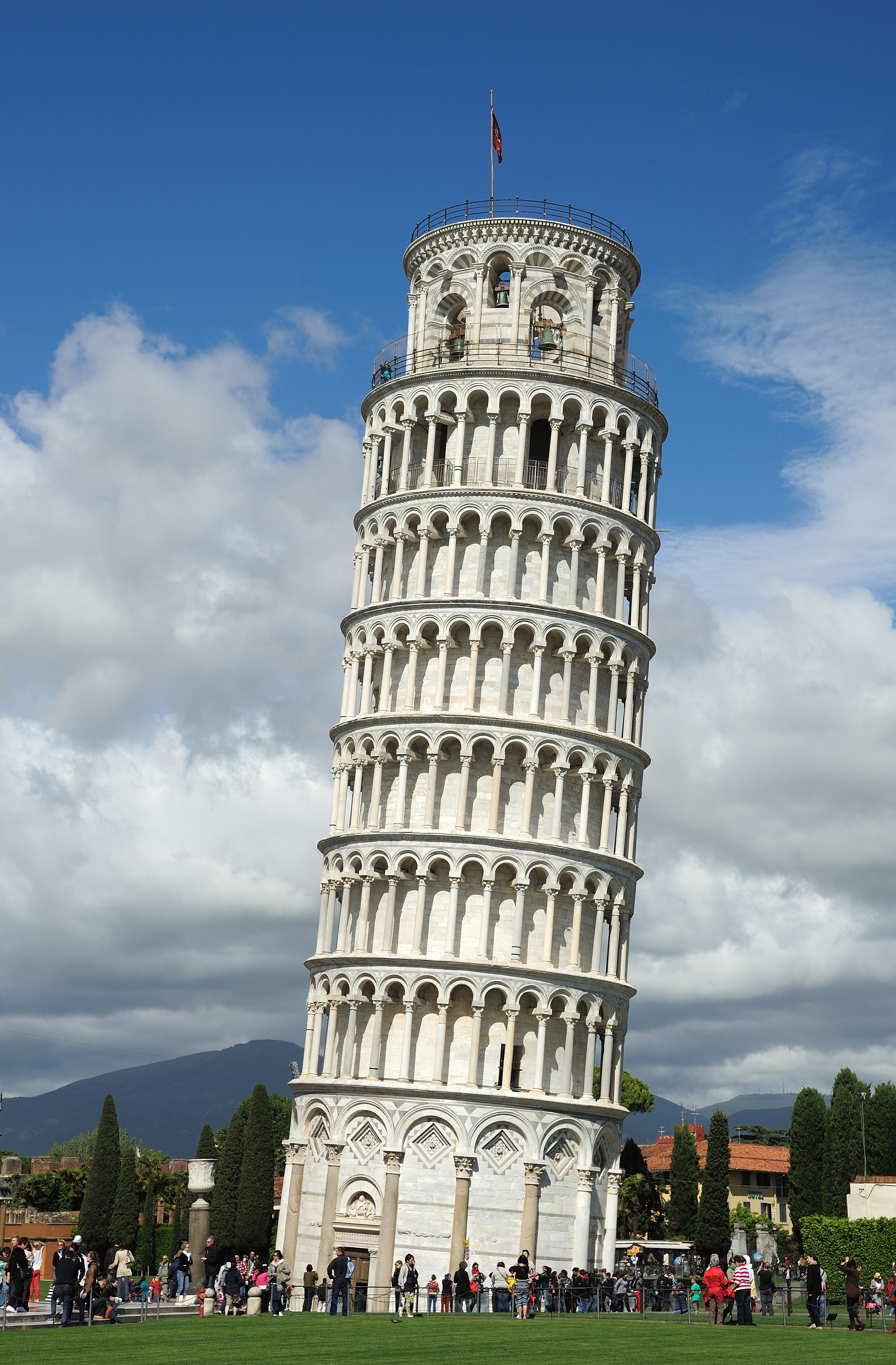
The Leaning Tower of Pisa, Italy, an iconic leaning tower

This is a list of leaning towers. A leaning tower is a tower which, either intentionally or unintentionally (due to errors in design, construction, or subsequent external influence such as unstable ground), does not stand perpendicular to the ground. The most famous example is the Leaning Tower in Pisa, Italy.

According to economics reporter, Eric Lach, as he was reporting on the 1 Seaport building in 2025, "leaning towers are one of those problems . . . that modern societies think they've solved, or surpassed, despite all the evidence to the contrary".

== Asia ==
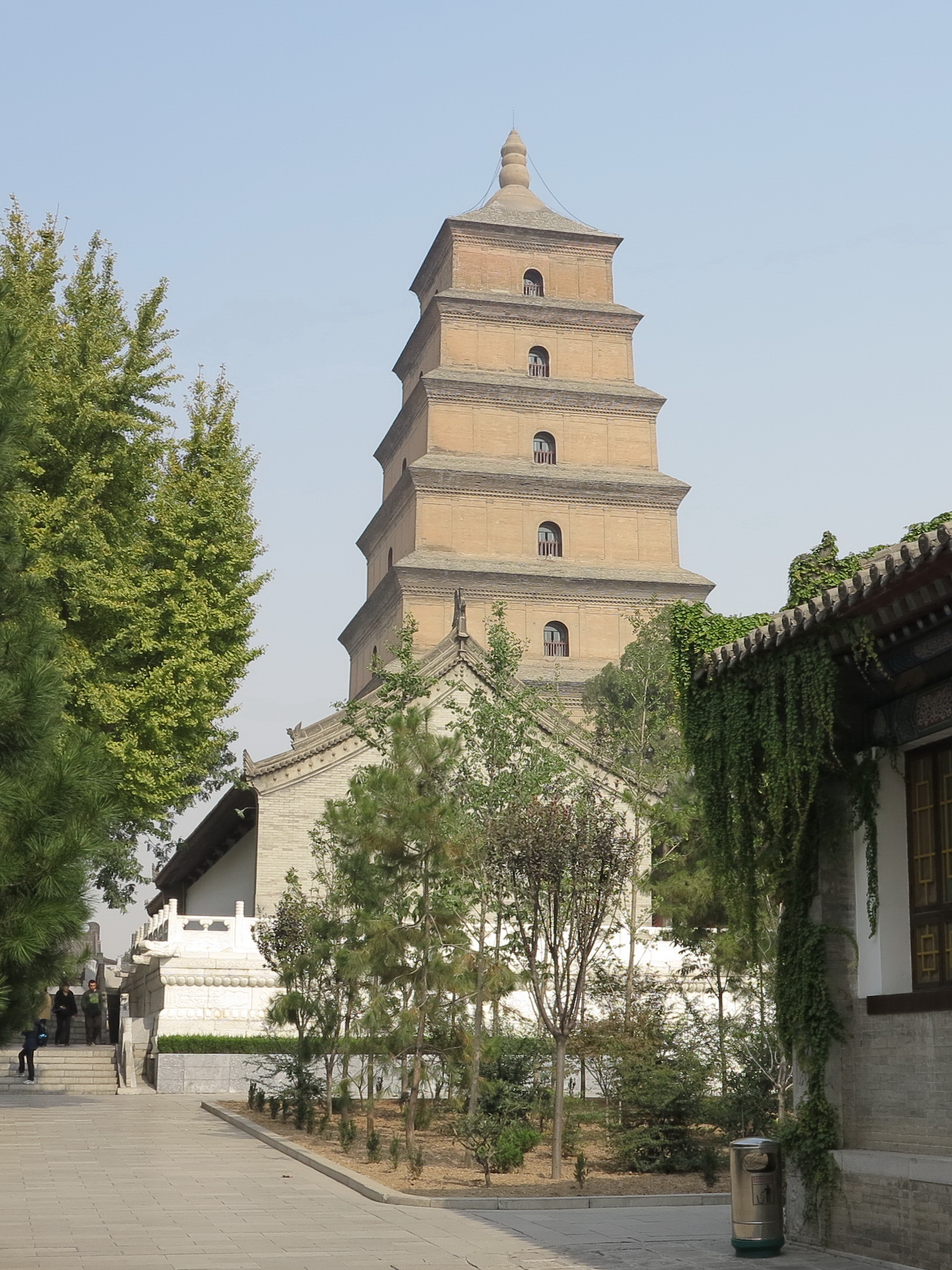
Giant Wild Goose Pagoda, Xi'an, China

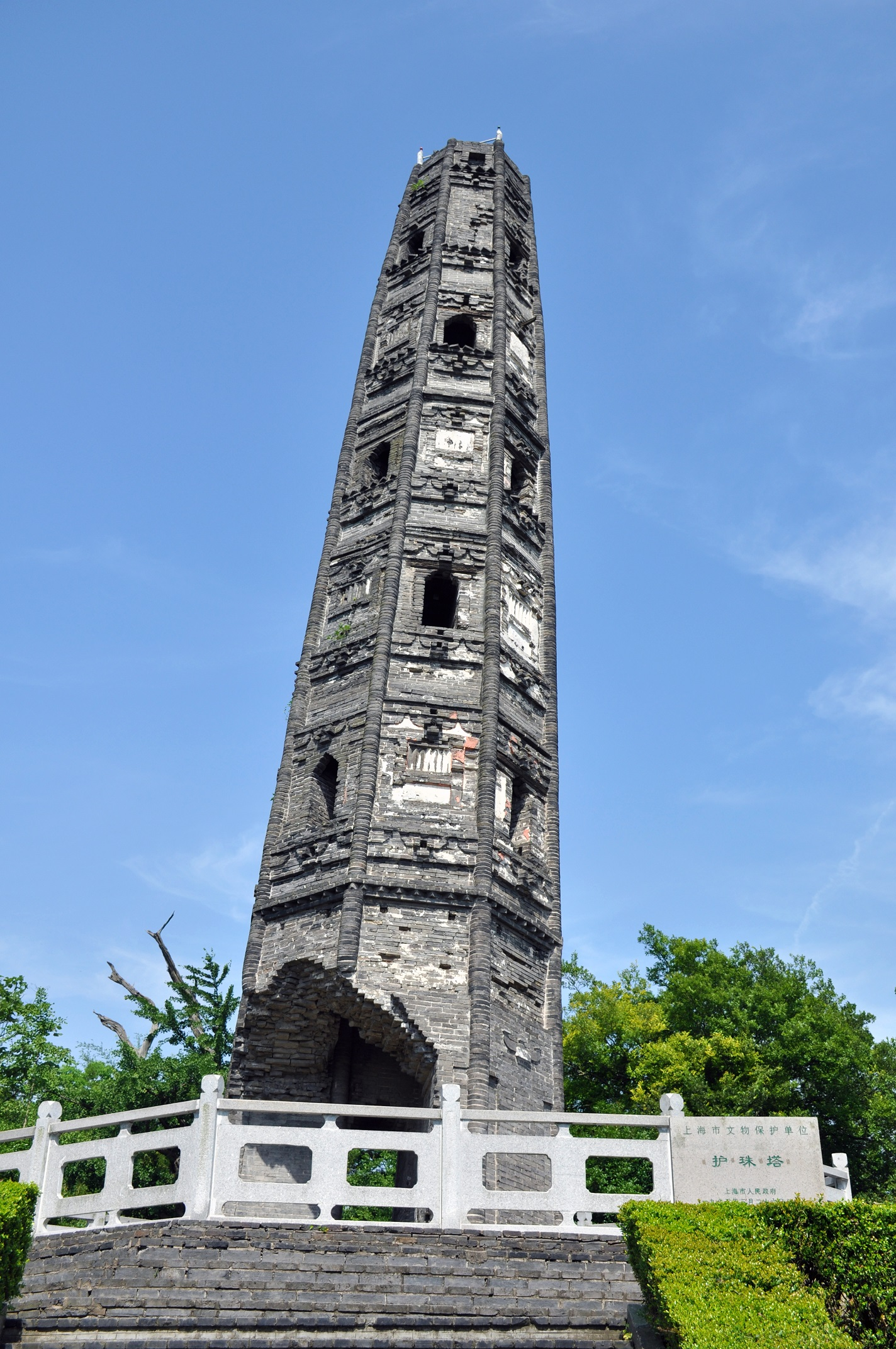
Huzhu Pagoda, Tianma Mtn, China

=== China ===
- The Giant Wild Goose Pagoda of Xi'an
- The Huzhu Pagoda of Tianma Mountain near Shanghai
- The Huqiu Tower in Suzhou, Jiangsu
- The deliberately tilted Iron Tower of Yuquan Temple, Hubei
- Qianwei's Leaning Tower in Suizhong County, Liaoning
- Baoguang Temple's pagoda: only the top levels are tilted

==== Hong Kong ====
- The pair of towers of Hong Kong–Shenzhen Western Corridor

=== India ===
- Golden Pillar in Ettumanur temple
- The Leaning Temple of Huma, Sambalpur
- Ratneshwar Mahadev temple, Varanasi

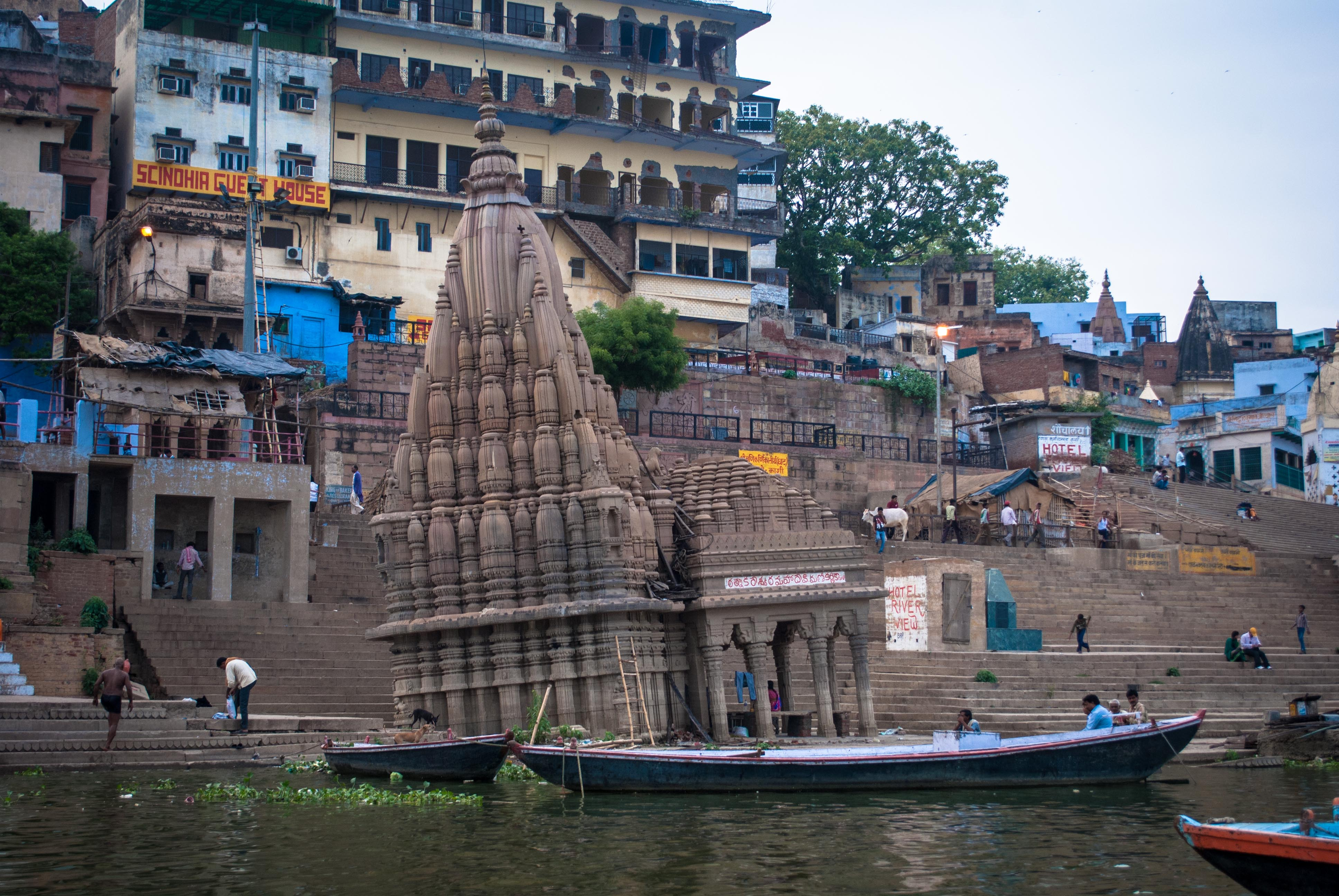
Ratneshwar Mahadev temple, Varanasi, India

=== Iraq ===
- The 12th century Great Mosque of al-Nuri in Mosul, destroyed in 2017, reconstructed in 2025

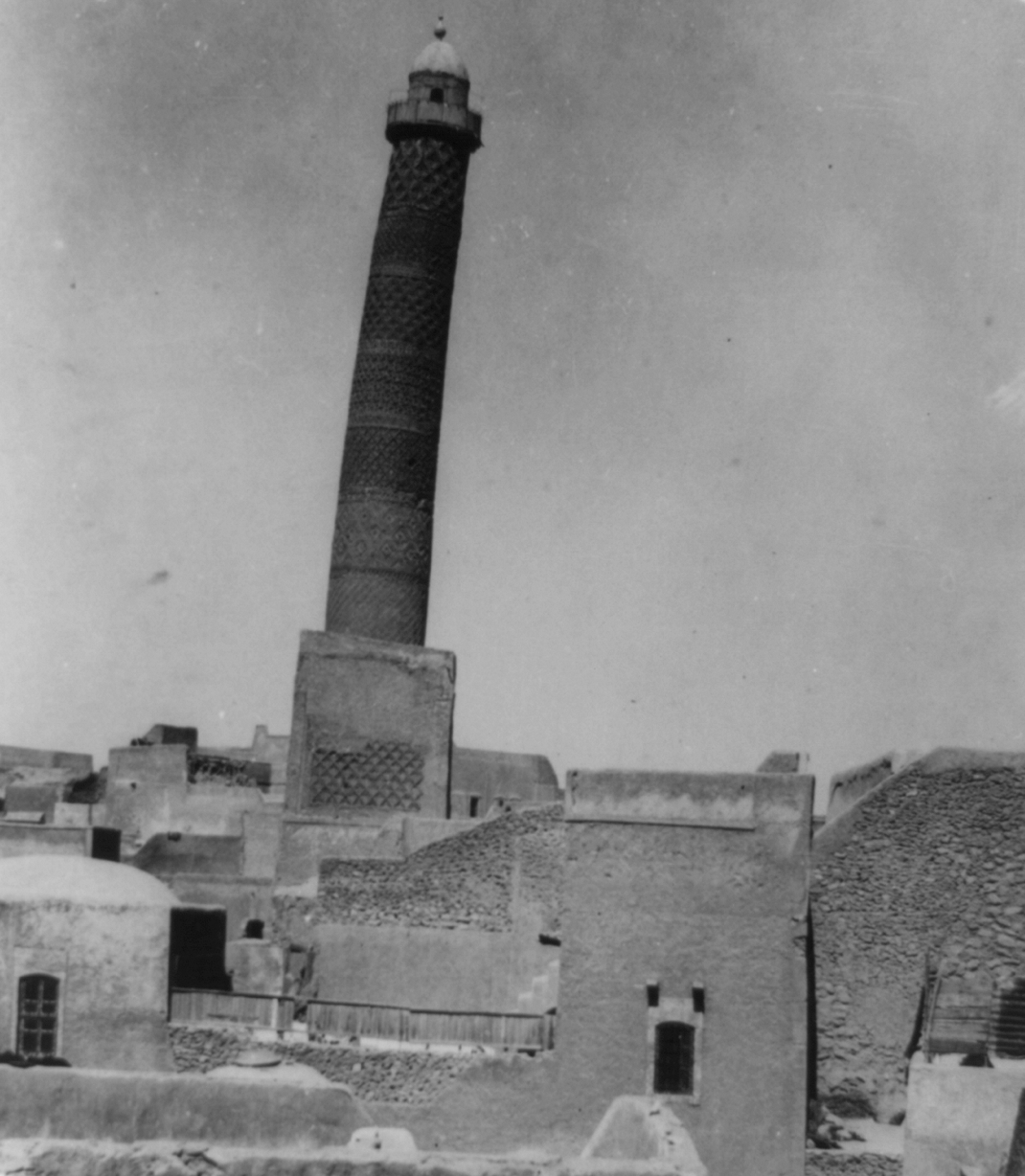
The 12th century Great Mosque of al-Nuri in Mosul, Iraq in 1932

=== Malaysia ===
- The Leaning Tower of Teluk Intan, a water/clock tower located in Teluk Intan, Hilir Perak District, Perak, Malaysia.

=== Philippines ===
- Bombon Parish Church Bell Tower

=== Sri Lanka ===
- Altair, twin skyscraper complex in Colombo

The Altair twin skyscrapers, Sri Lanka

=== UAE ===
- Capital Gate, skyscraper in Abu Dhabi

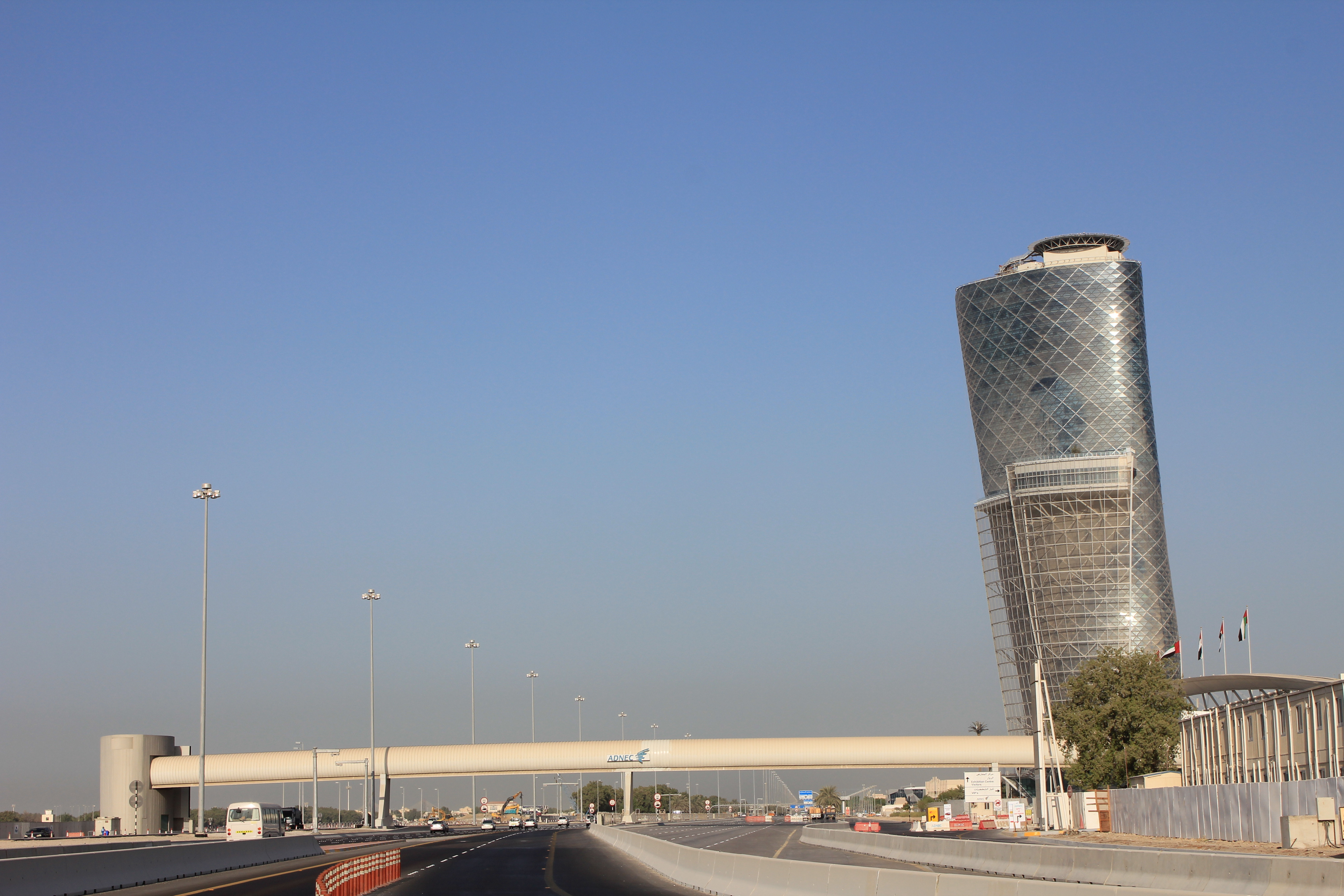
Capital Gate, Abu Dhabi, UAE

== Europe ==
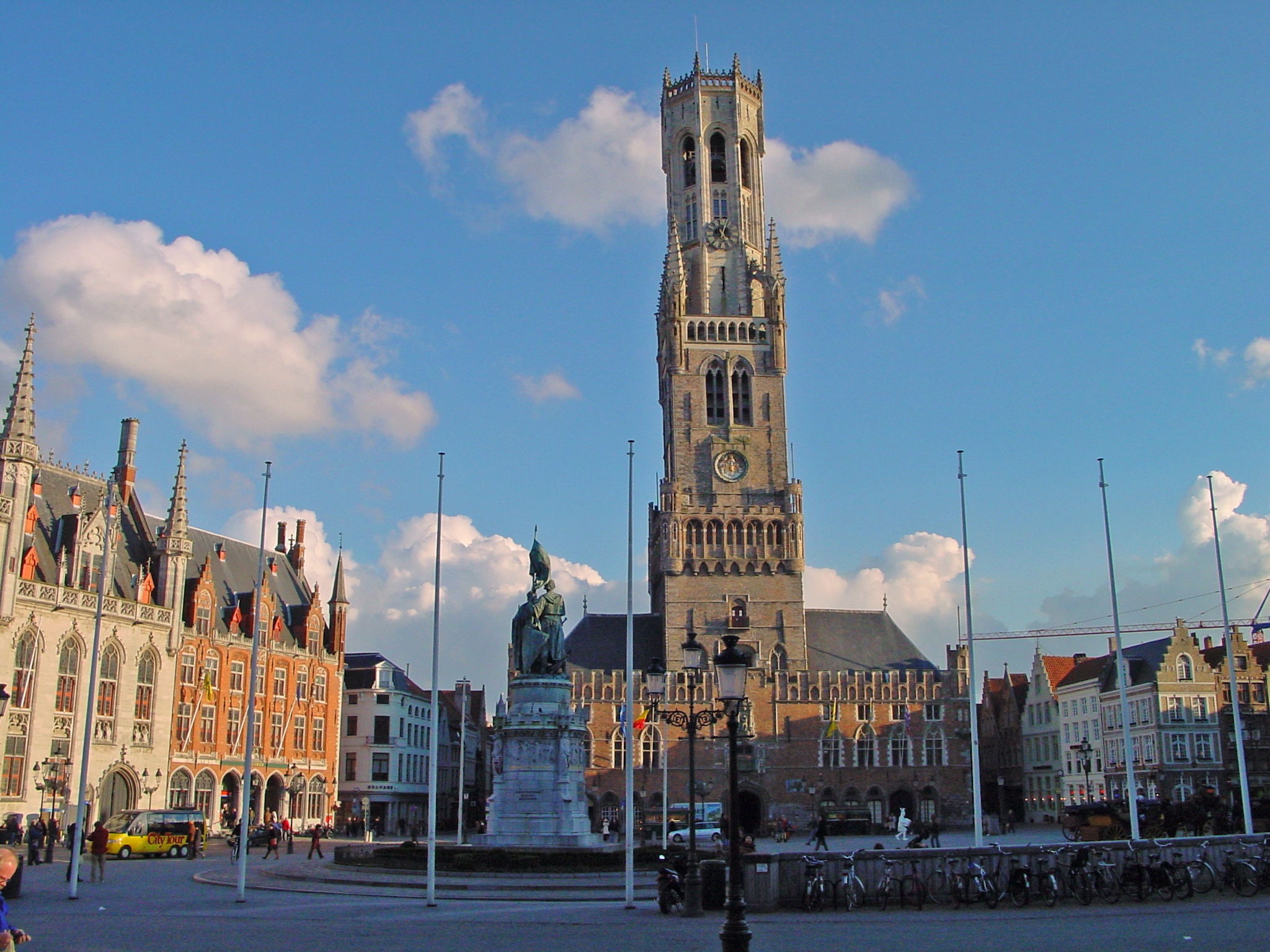
Belfry of Bruges, Belgium

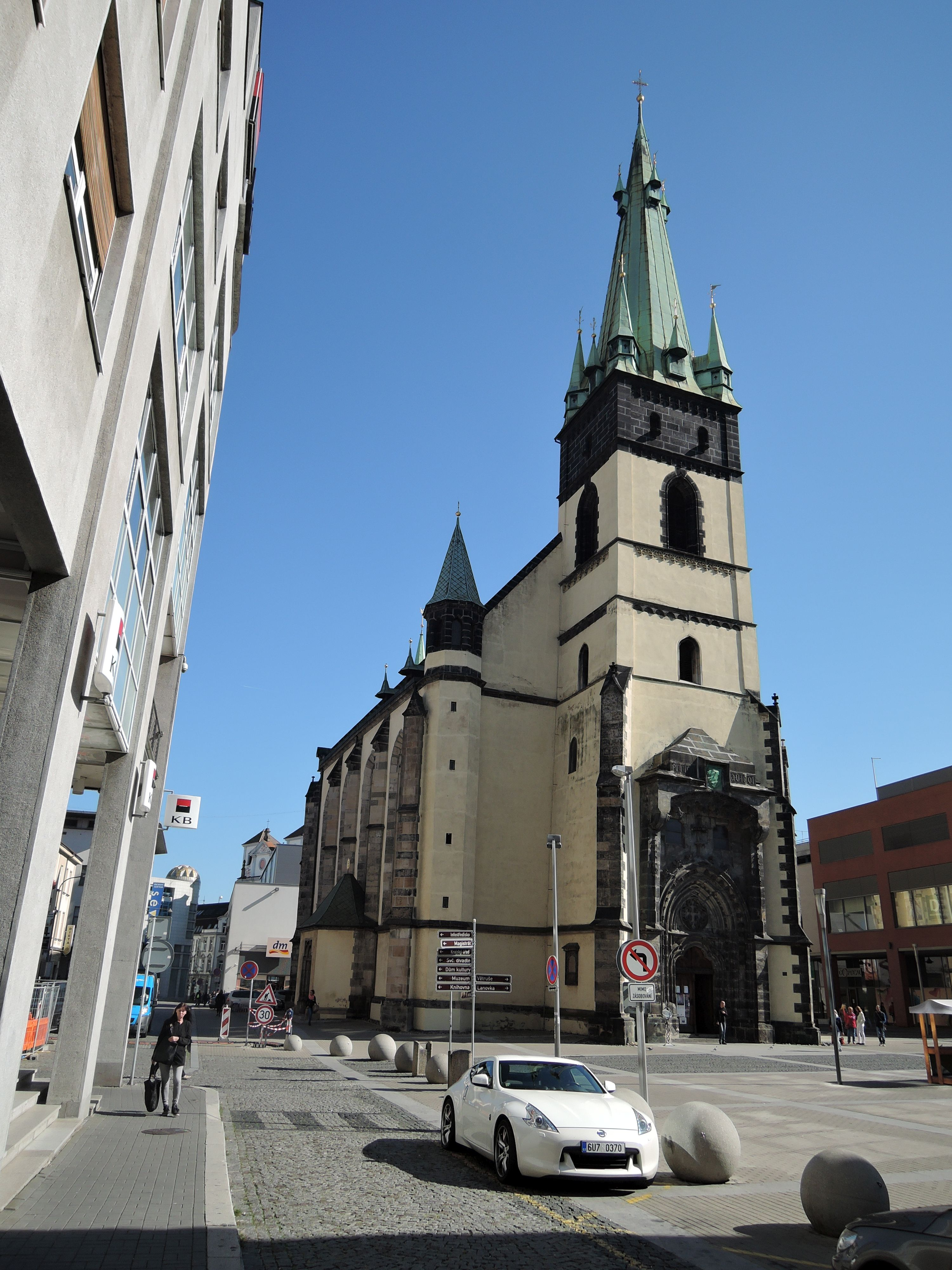
Panny Marie Church Tower, Ústí nad Labem, Czech Republic

=== Belgium ===
- The Belfry of Bruges
- The tower of Sts. Peter and Paul Church in Schelle
- The tower of the abbey church in Ninove

=== Czech Republic ===
- The tower of the Nanebevzetí Panny Marie church in Ústí nad Labem
- Church of Saint Peter of Alcantara in Karviná
- The Putna Tower at Michalovice Castle, most tilted structure in the world.

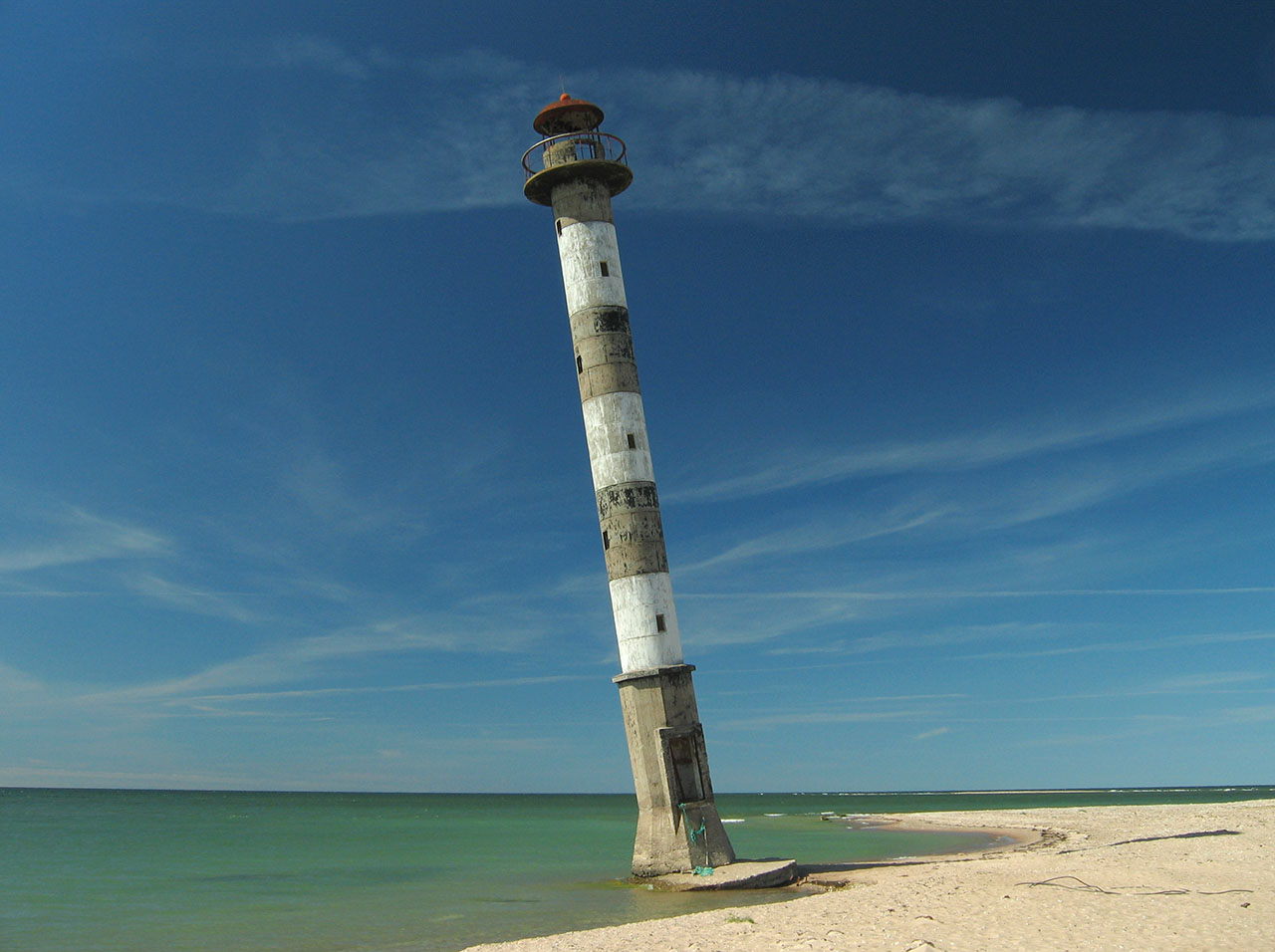
Kiipsaare Lighthouse, Saaremaa, Estonia

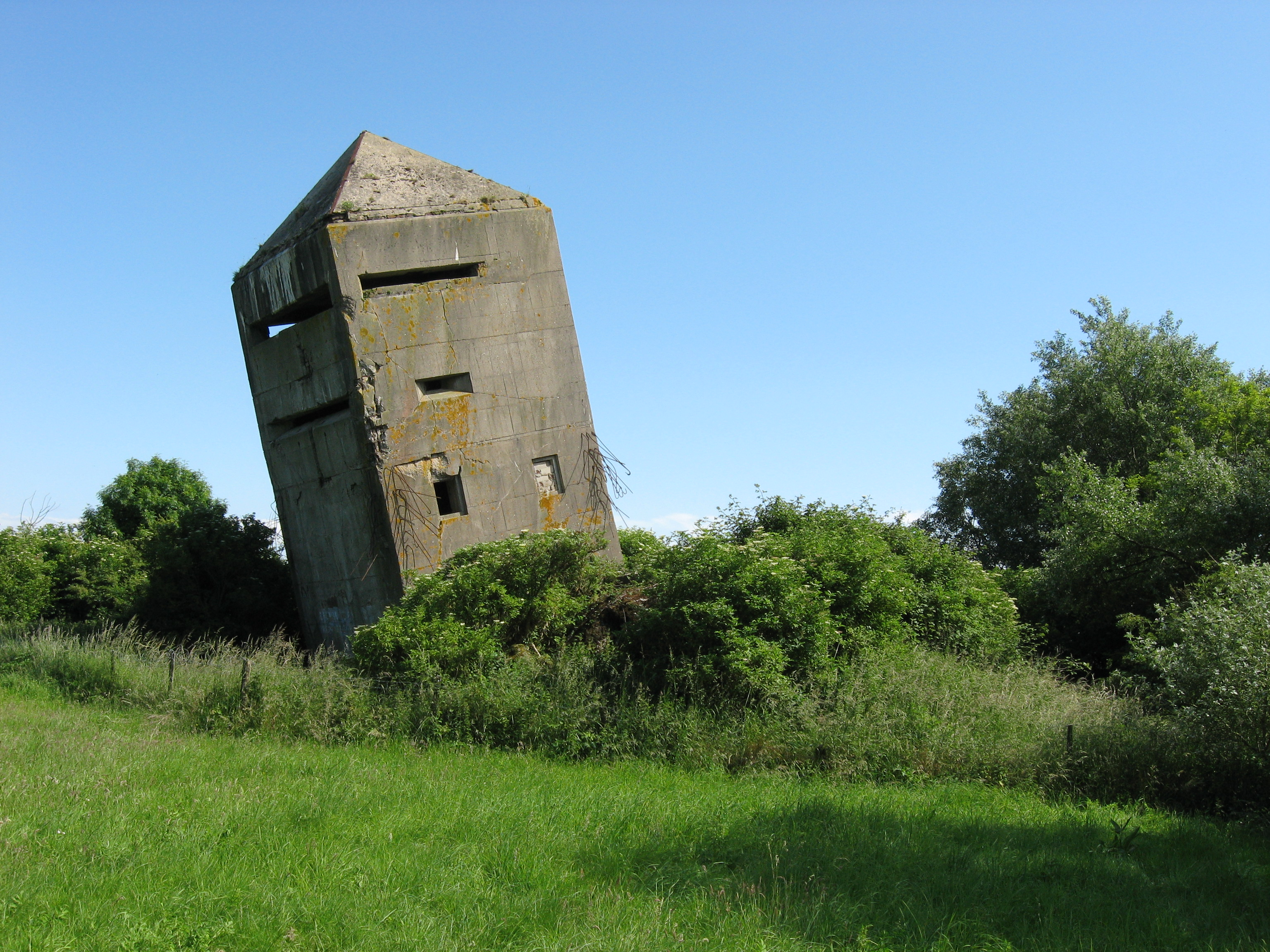
La tour penchée, Oye-Plage, Pas-de-Calais, France

=== Estonia ===
- Karski Church (in Estonian) in Karksi-Nuia
- Kiipsaare Lighthouse in Saaremaa

=== France ===
- La tour penchée, Oye-Plage, Pas-de-Calais

=== Germany ===
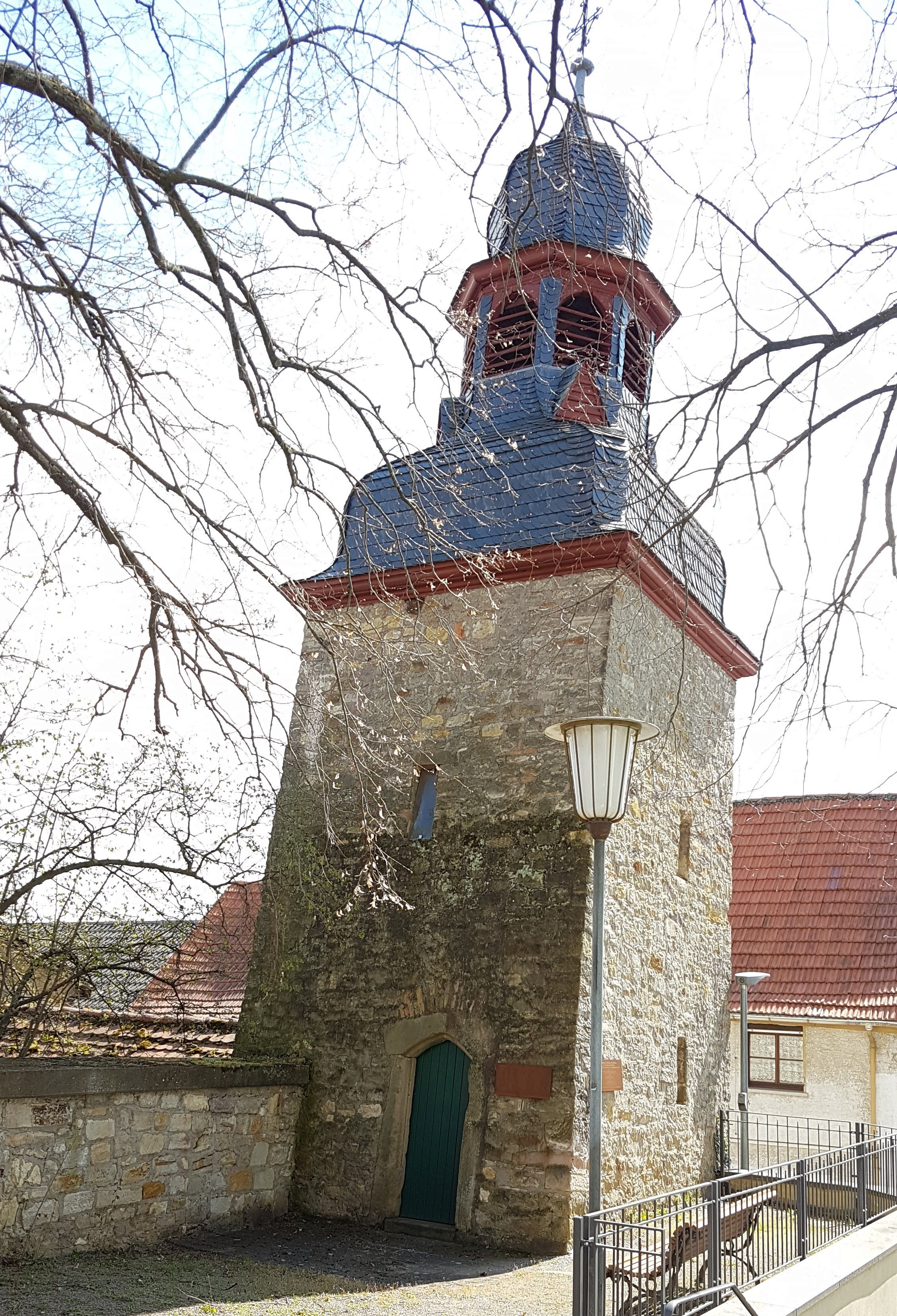
Tower of Gau-Weinheim, Germany

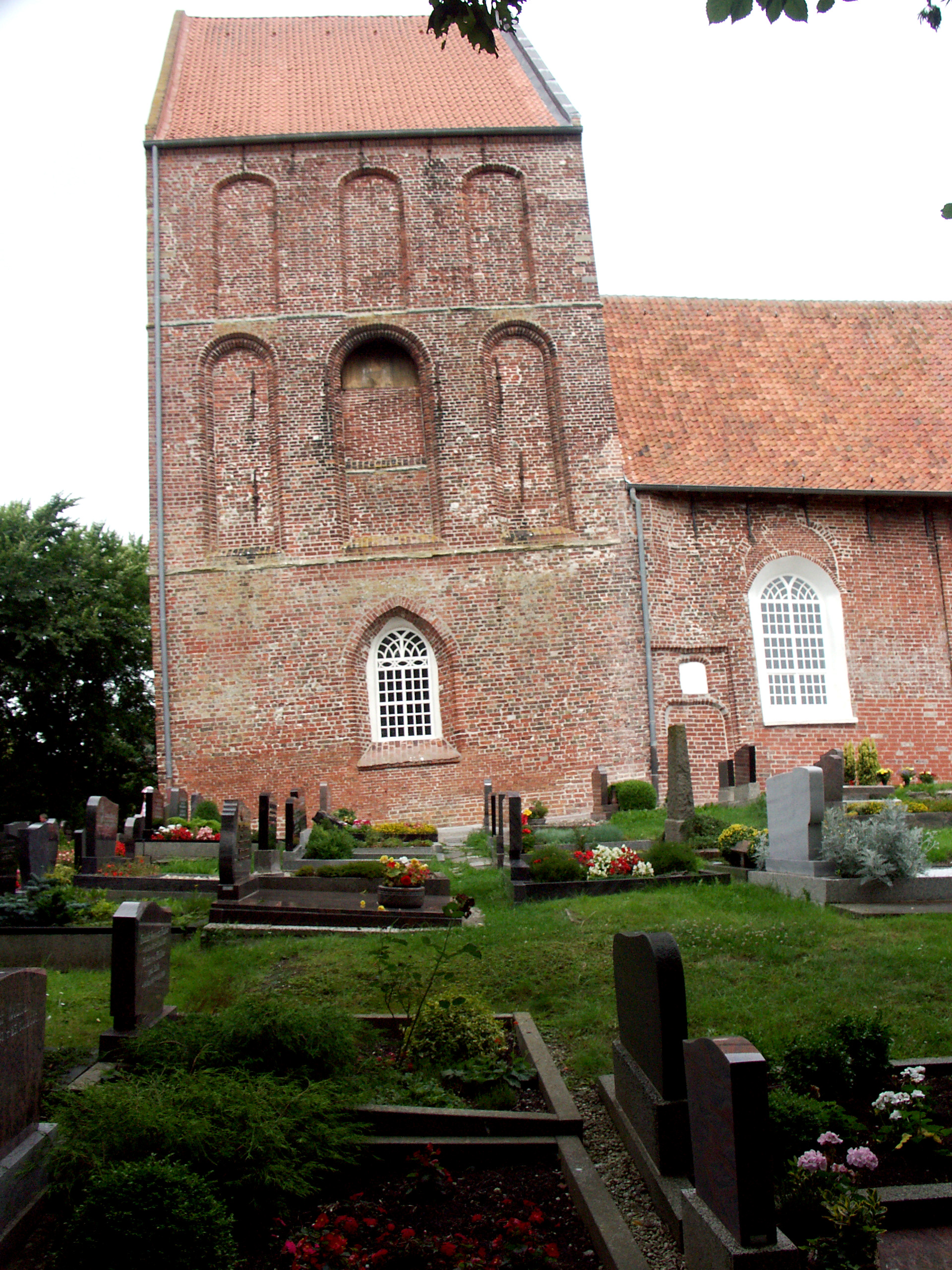
Tower of Suurhusen, Germany

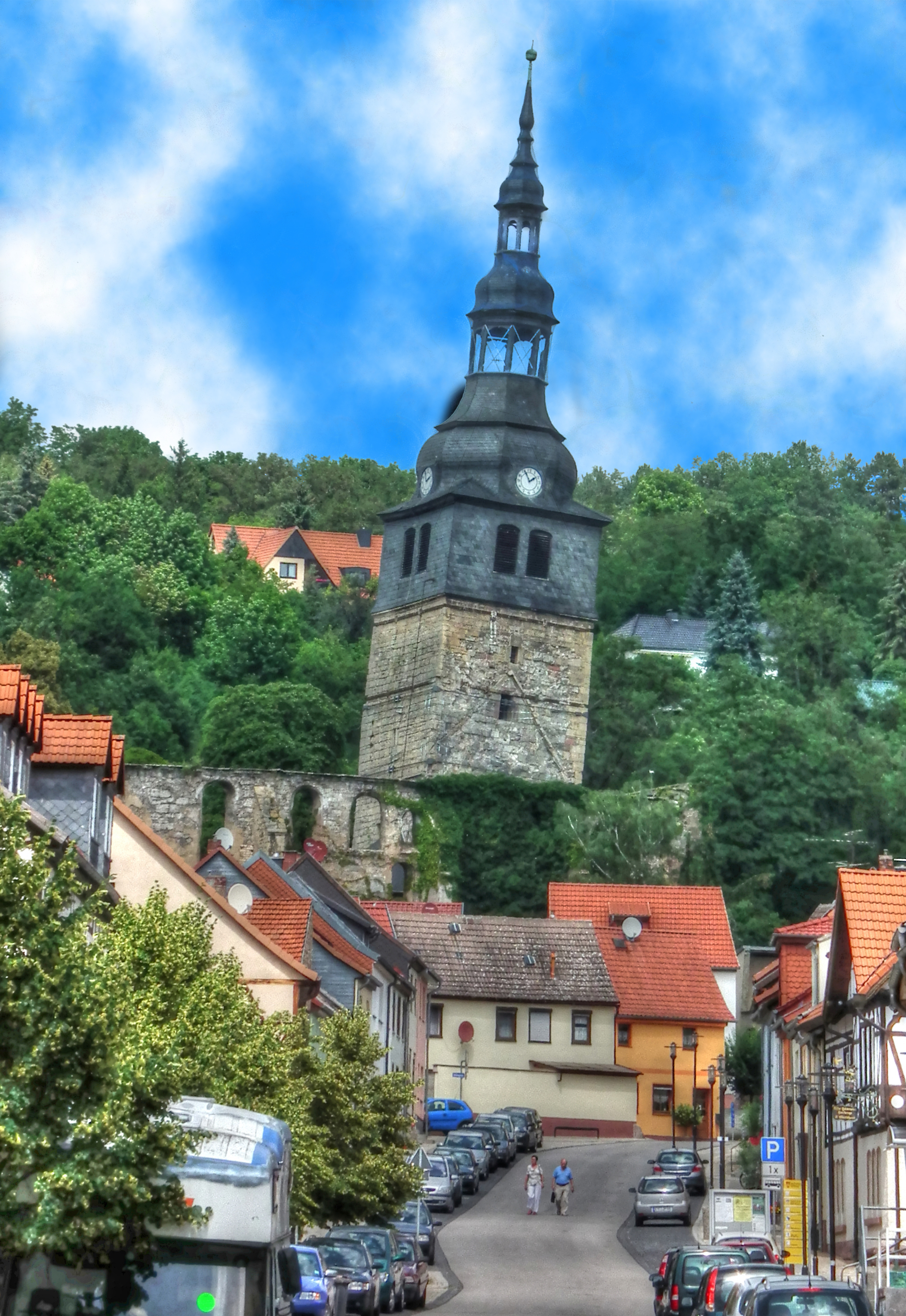
Oberkirche, Bad Frankenhausen, Germany

- Oberkirche in Bad Frankenhausen
- The Metzgerturm in Ulm
- The Neuer Zollhof in Düsseldorf
- The Reichenturm in Bautzen
- Bell tower of Midlum (Rheiderland)
- The Leaning Tower of Gau-Weinheim (lean 5.4277° on 15 July 2022, greater than Suurhusen)
- The Leaning Tower of Suurhusen, Schiefer Turm von Suurhusen. at an angle which was according to Guinness World Records in 2007 the greatest for an unintentionally tilted tower
- The Leaning Tower of Dausenau (Schiefer Turm von Dausenau) (slightly further leaning than the Tower of Suurhusen, disqualified by Guinness World Records for being a ruin instead of a tower)
- The 14th-century bell tower of the Church of Our Dear Lady in Bad Frankenhausen
- The 13th-century tower in Kitzingen is distinctive for its crooked roof due to top floor being offset. This offset, due to town legend, was due to wine being used instead of water for the top floor during a serious drought.

=== Hungary ===
- Szécsény Firewatch Tower, leaning 3 degrees

=== Ireland ===
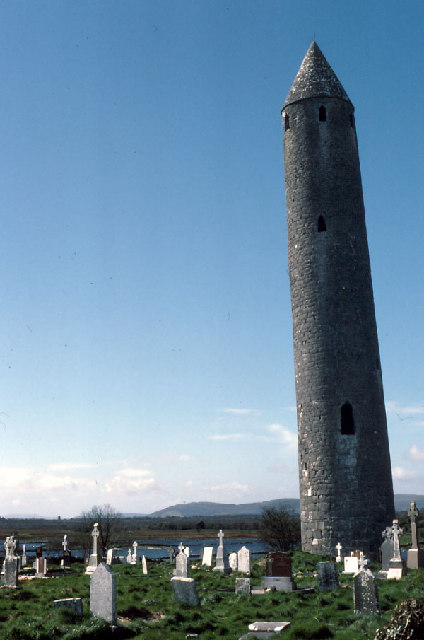
Round Tower of Kilmacduagh, Ireland

- The Round Tower of Kilmacduagh Monastery in Gort, County Galway
- Bastioned fort, Passage East, County Waterford.

=== Italy ===
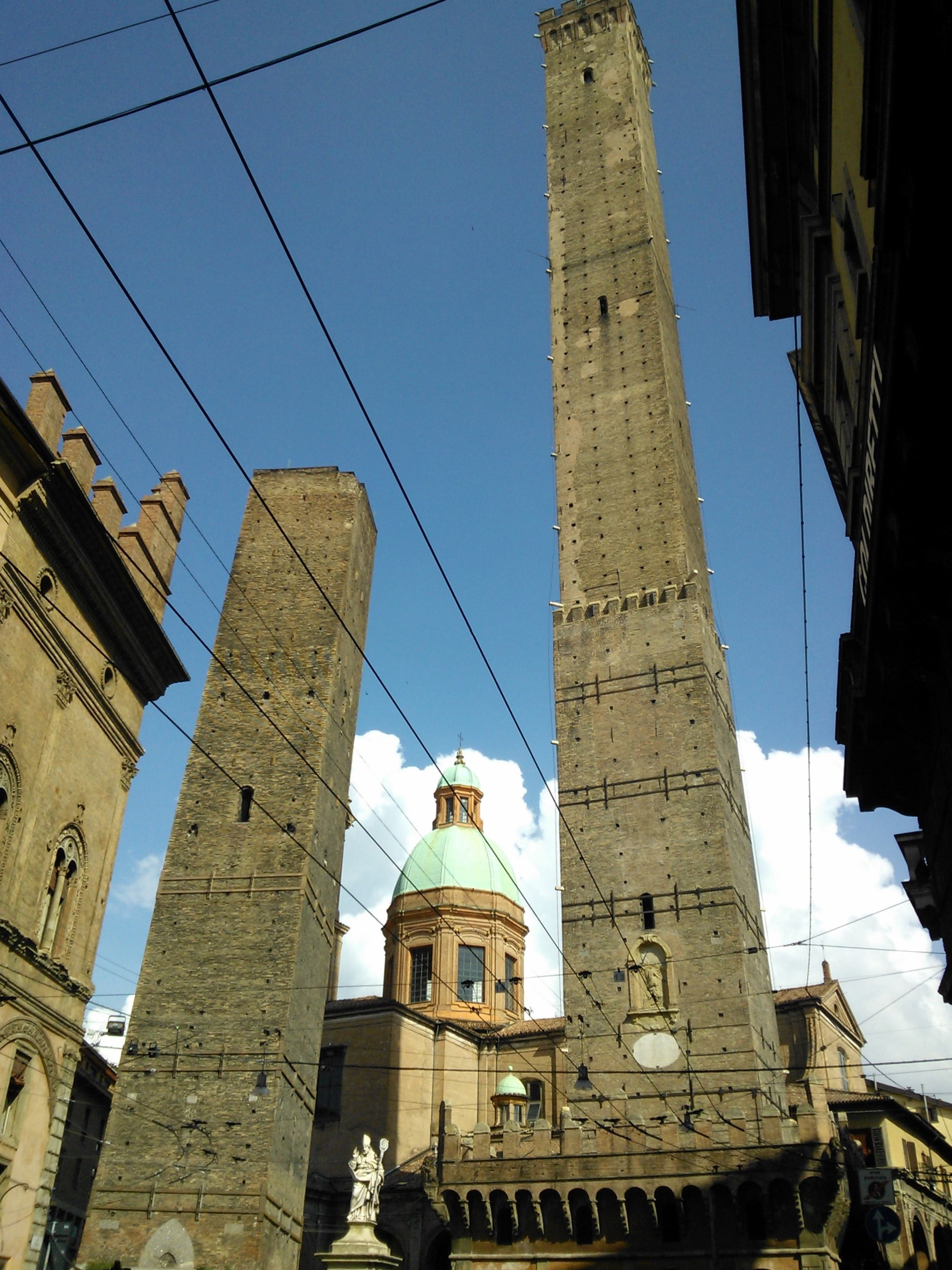
The Two Towers, Bologna, Italy

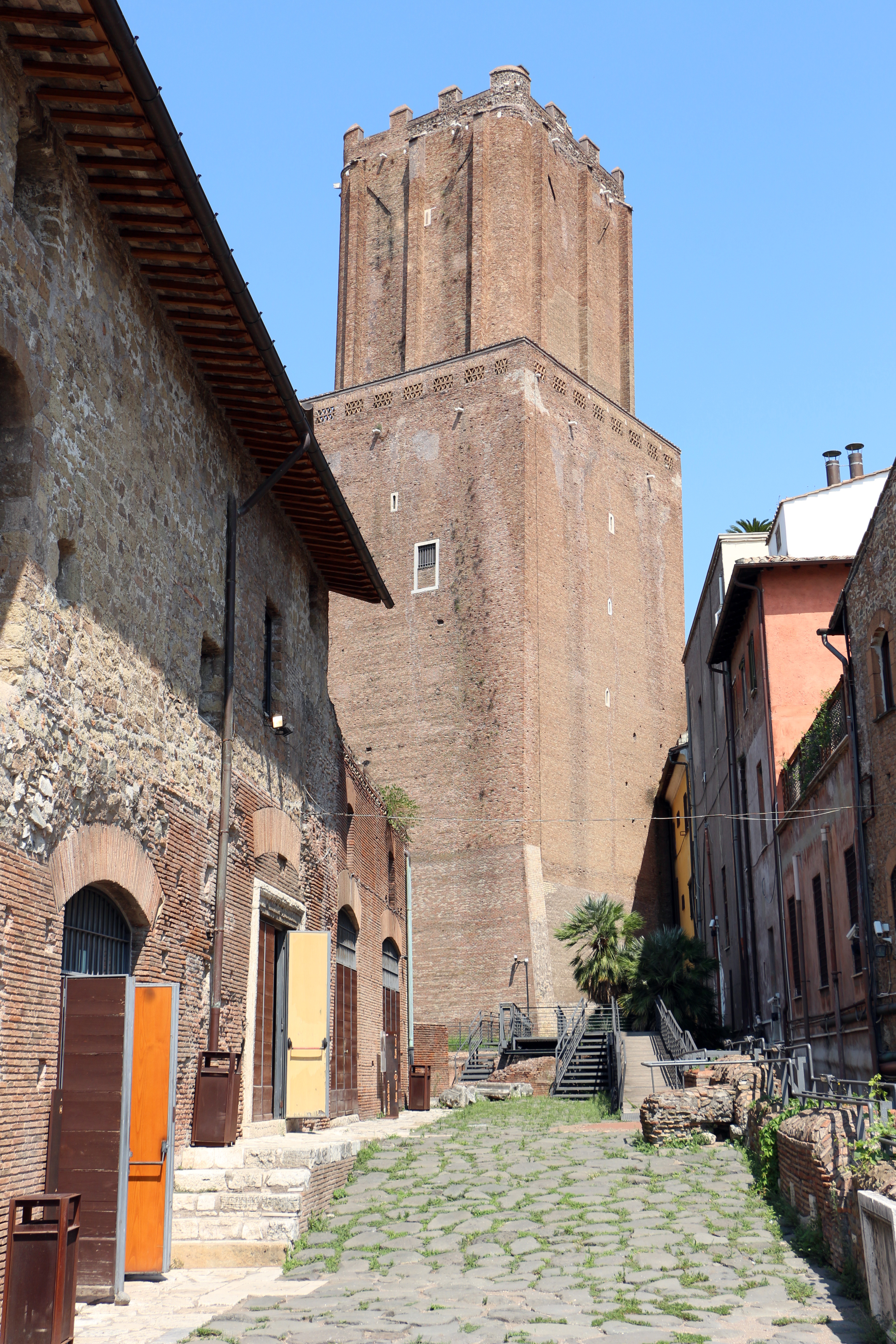
Torre delle Milizie, Rome, Italy

- The campanile of Duomo di Caorle
- Bellisario's Tower (Cerreto D'Esi, Ancona)
- The campanile (bell tower) of the Cathedral of Pisa (known as the Leaning Tower of Pisa), Pisa
- The campanile of Duomo di Portogruaro
- The campanile of San Giorgio dei Greci in Venice
- The campanile of San Martino church on the island of Burano, Venice
- The campanile of San Michele, Massino Visconti
- The campanile of the church of San Matteo in Molinella
- The campanile of San Michele degli Scalzi, Pisa
- The campanile of San Nicola, Pisa
- The Arengo tower of Palazzo del Podestà, Bologna
- The campanile of Santo Stefano in Venice
- Torre delle Milizie, Rome
- The Two Towers (Asinelli and Garisenda towers in Bologna)
- The San Benedetto church and bell tower, Ferrera
- The campanile of the parish church in Barbian, South Tyrol

=== Netherlands ===
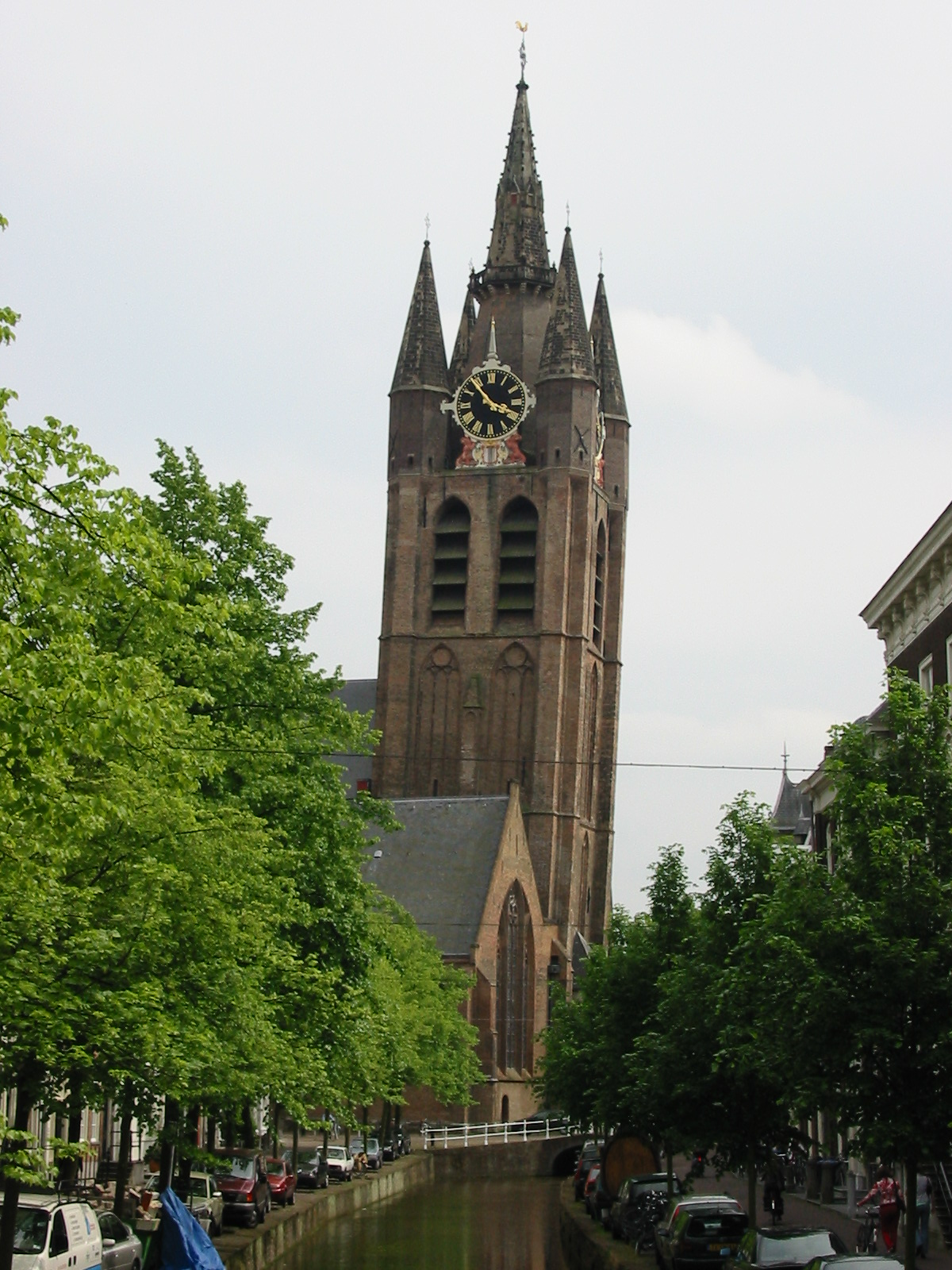
Oude Kerk, Delft, Netherlands

- The tower of the St. Walfriduskerk in Bedum
- The tower of the Oude Kerk in Delft
- The tower of the Grote Kerk of Dordrecht
- The Oldehove in Leeuwarden
- The tower in Miedum
- The Martinitoren in Groningen
- The tower of the Catharinakerk in Acquoy
- The tower of the Domkerk in De Lier
- The tower of the church in Loenen aan de Vecht
- The tower of Sint-Jan de Doper church in Waalwijk

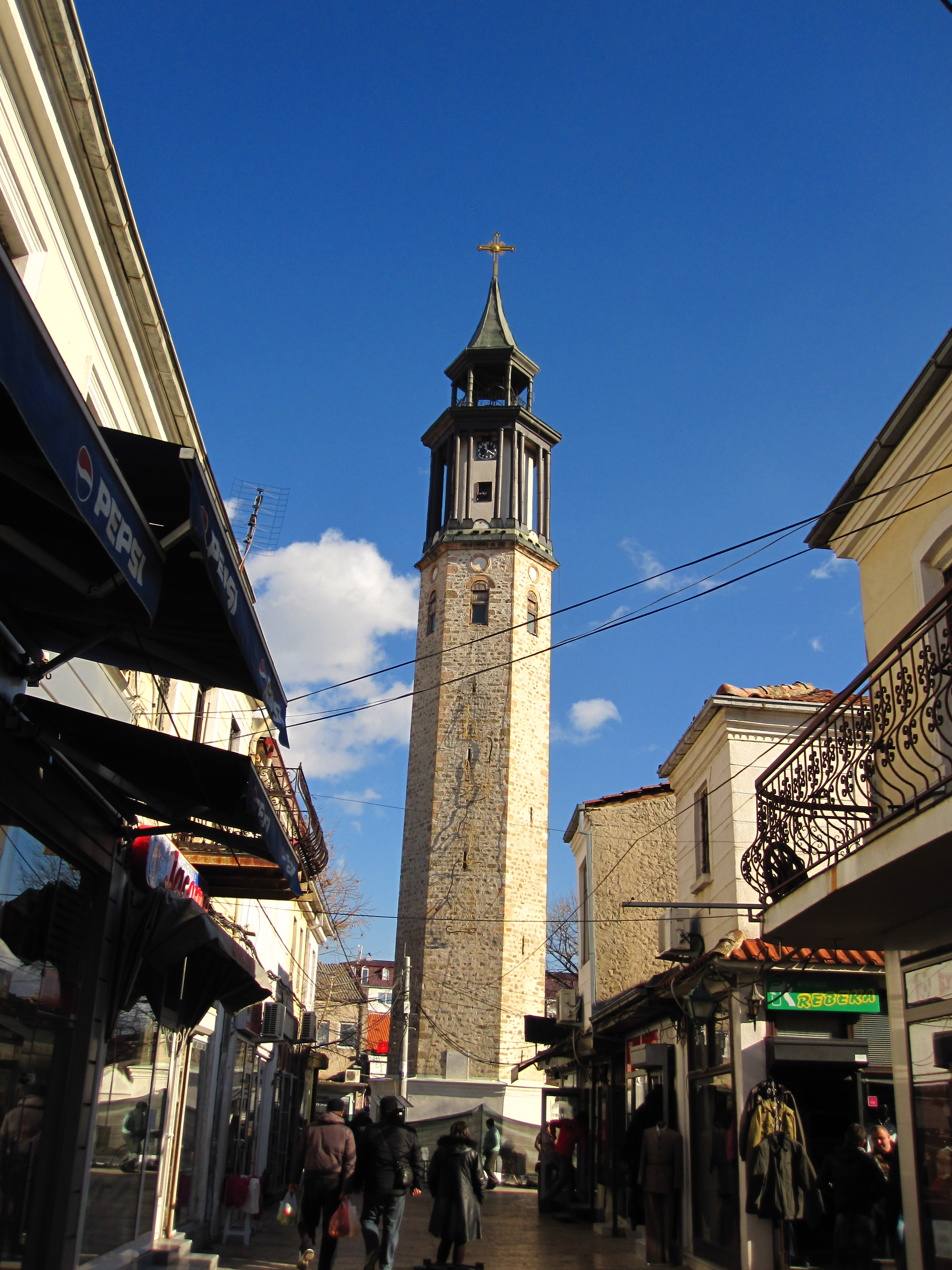
Clock Tower, Prilep, Northern Macedonia

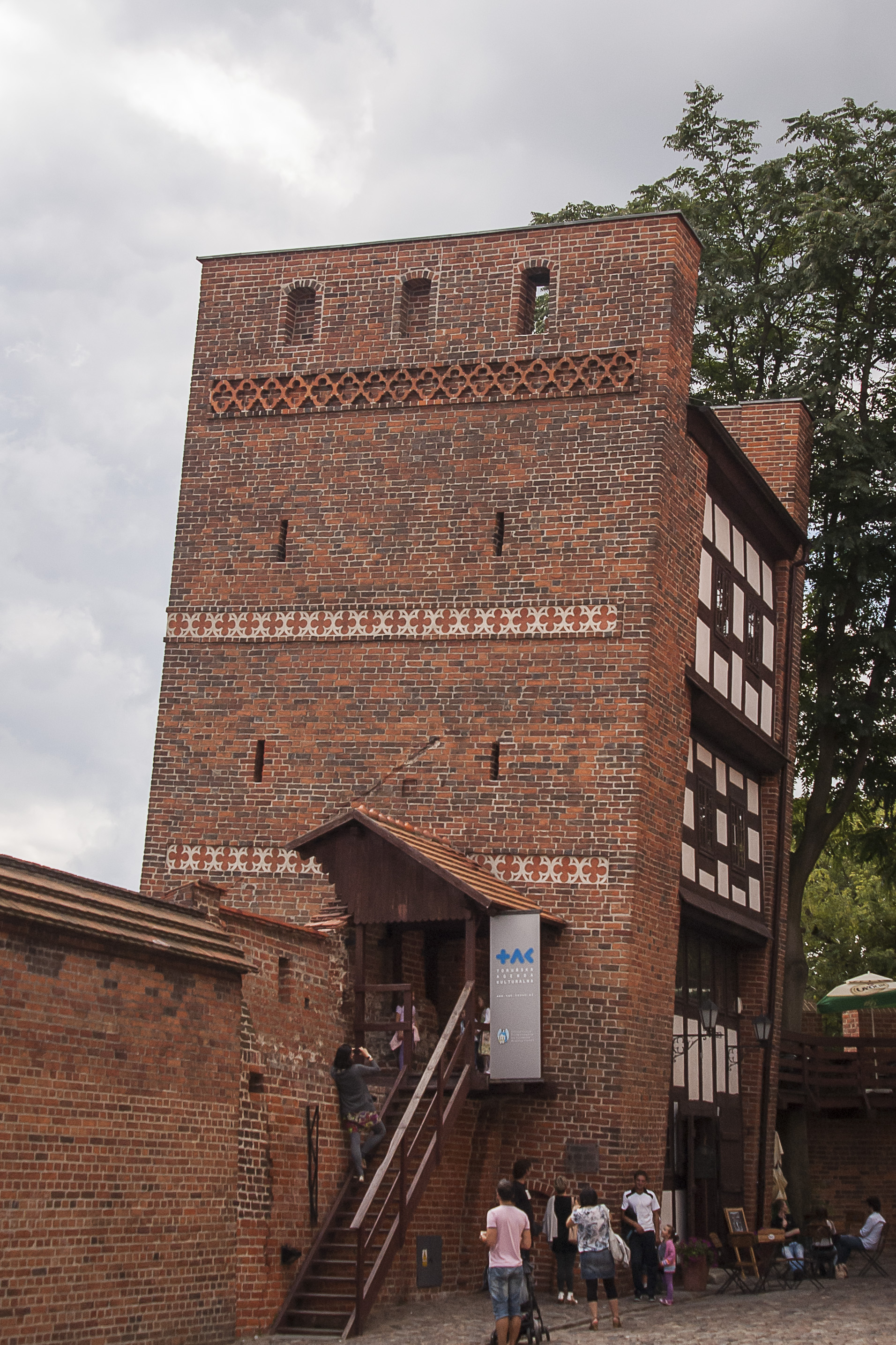
The Krzywa Wieża, Toruń, Poland

=== North Macedonia ===
- Clock Tower in Prilep in North Macedonia

=== Poland ===
- The Krzywa Wieża (Leaning Tower) in Toruń
- The Krzywa Wieża (Leaning Tower) in Ząbkowice Śląskie
- The Baszta Sowia (Owl's Tower) in Pyrzyce

=== Romania ===
- The St. Margaret Evangelic church Tower in Mediaș
- The church tower of the Evangelic Church in Ruși-Slimnic

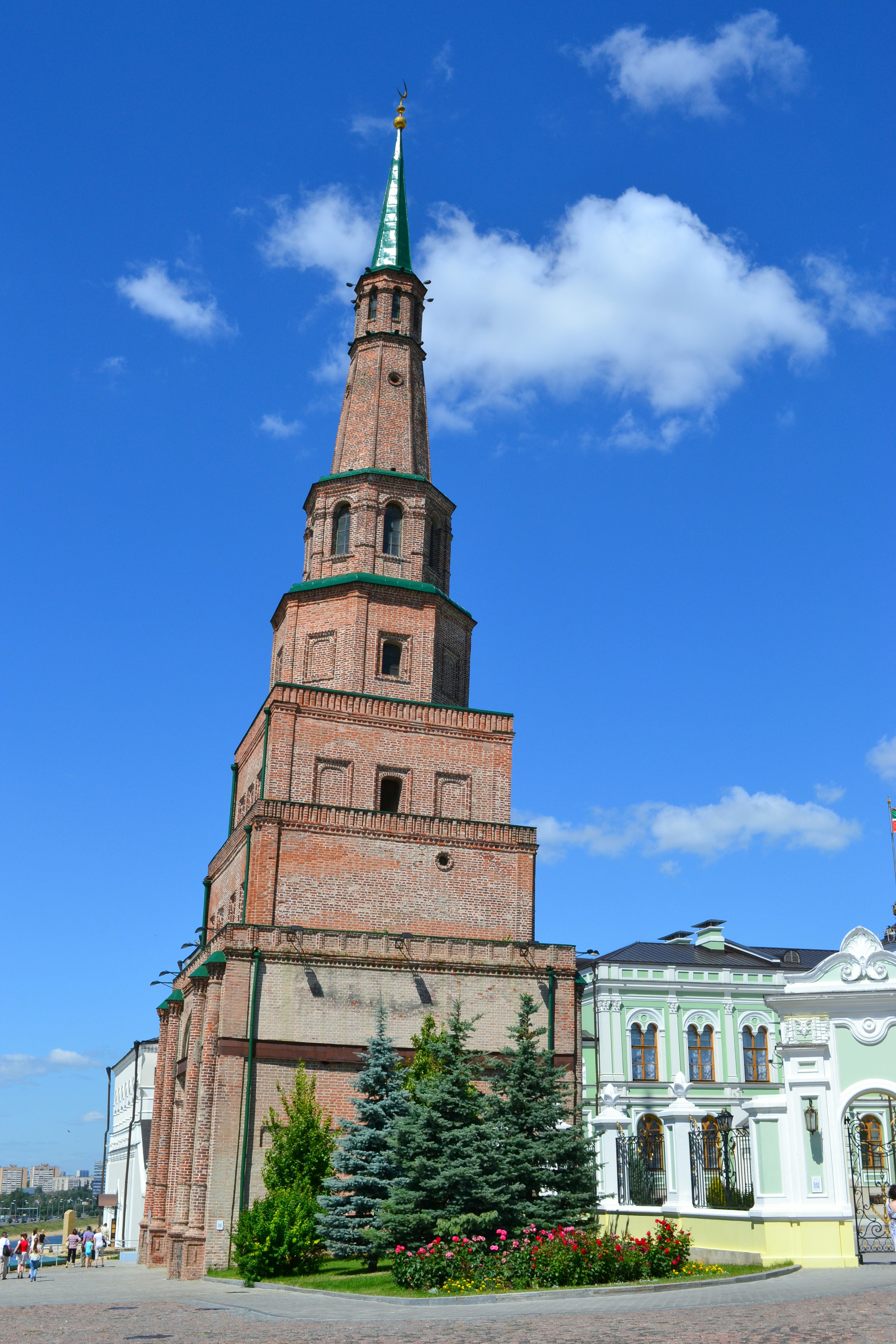
Söyembikä Tower, Kazan, Tatarstan, Russia

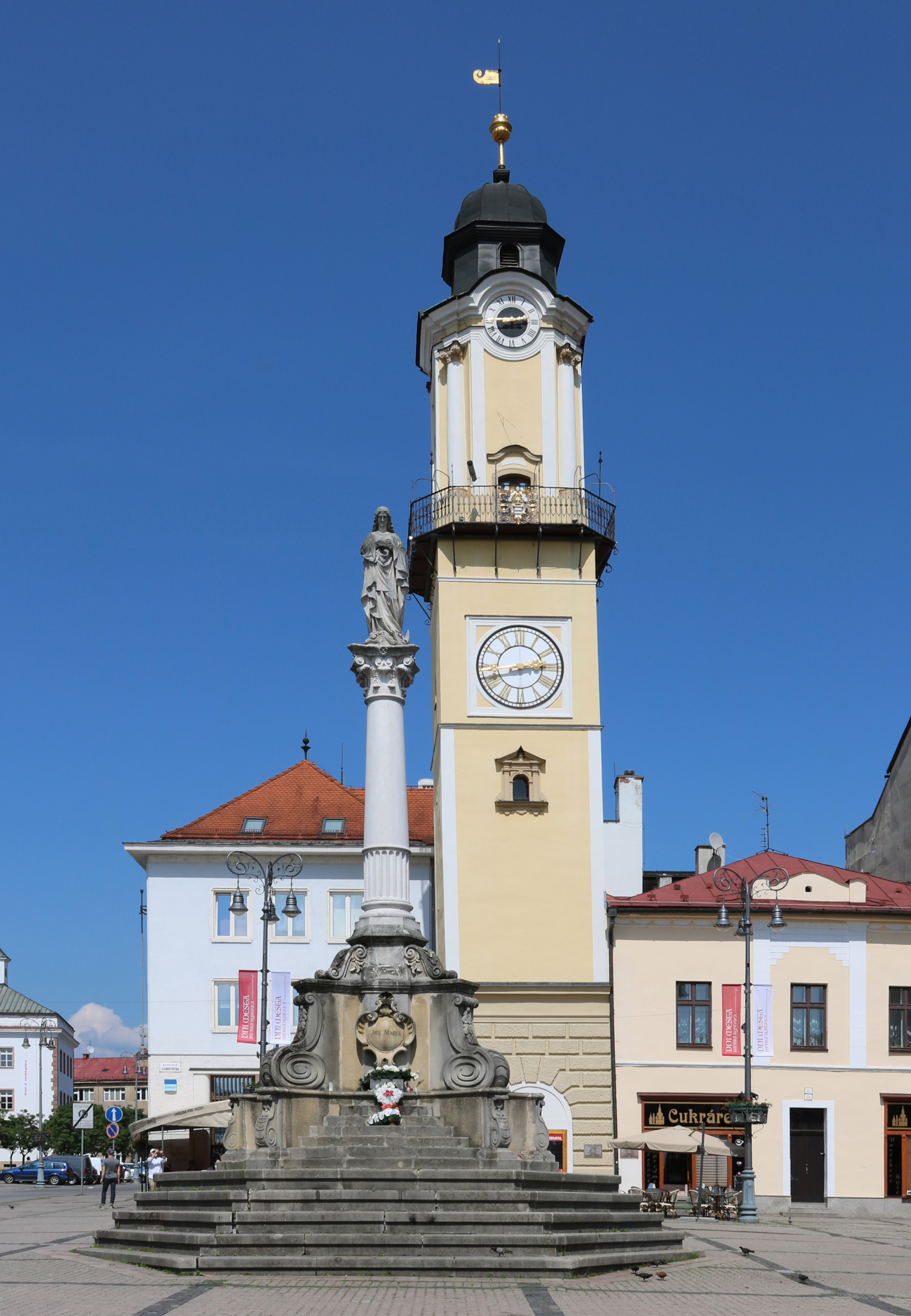
The Clock Tower on SNP Square, Banská Bystrica, Slovakia

=== Russia ===
- The Demidov Tower in Nevyansk
- The Sobornaya Belltower in Solikamsk
- The Söyembikä Tower in Kazan
- Belltower of the Church of the Theotokos of Tikhvin in Kungur
- Belltower of the Edoma Pogost near Arkhangelsk
- Belltower of the Church of All Saints in Moscow

=== Serbia ===
- Church of St. Anthony of Padua in Zvezdara municipality, Belgrade

=== Slovakia ===
- The tower of the Church of Saint Martin in Vrbové in Slovakia is known as the "Slovak Pisa".
- The Church of Saint George in Spišská Sobota
- The Clock Tower on SNP Square in Banská Bystrica

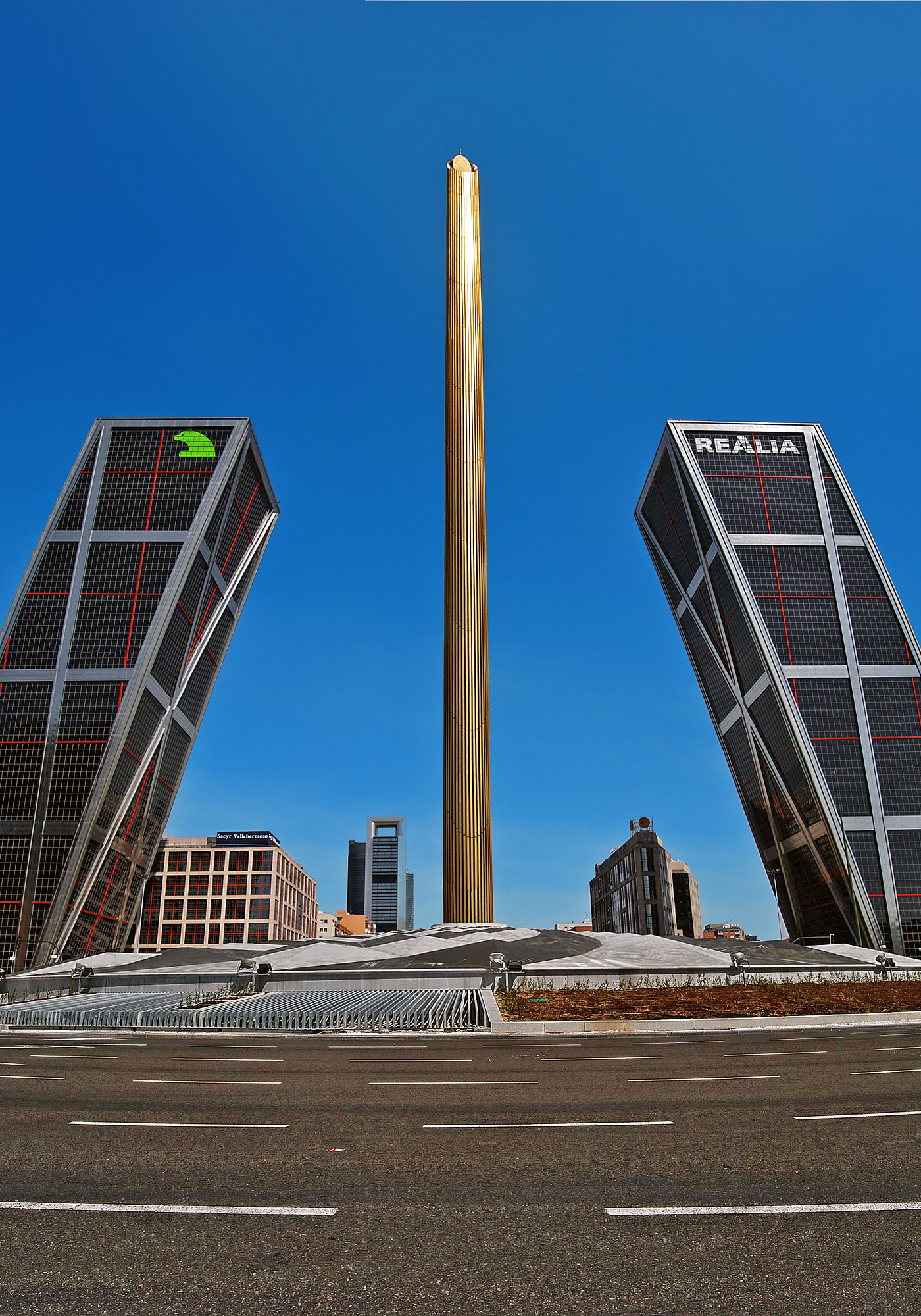
Gate of Europe, Madrid, Spain

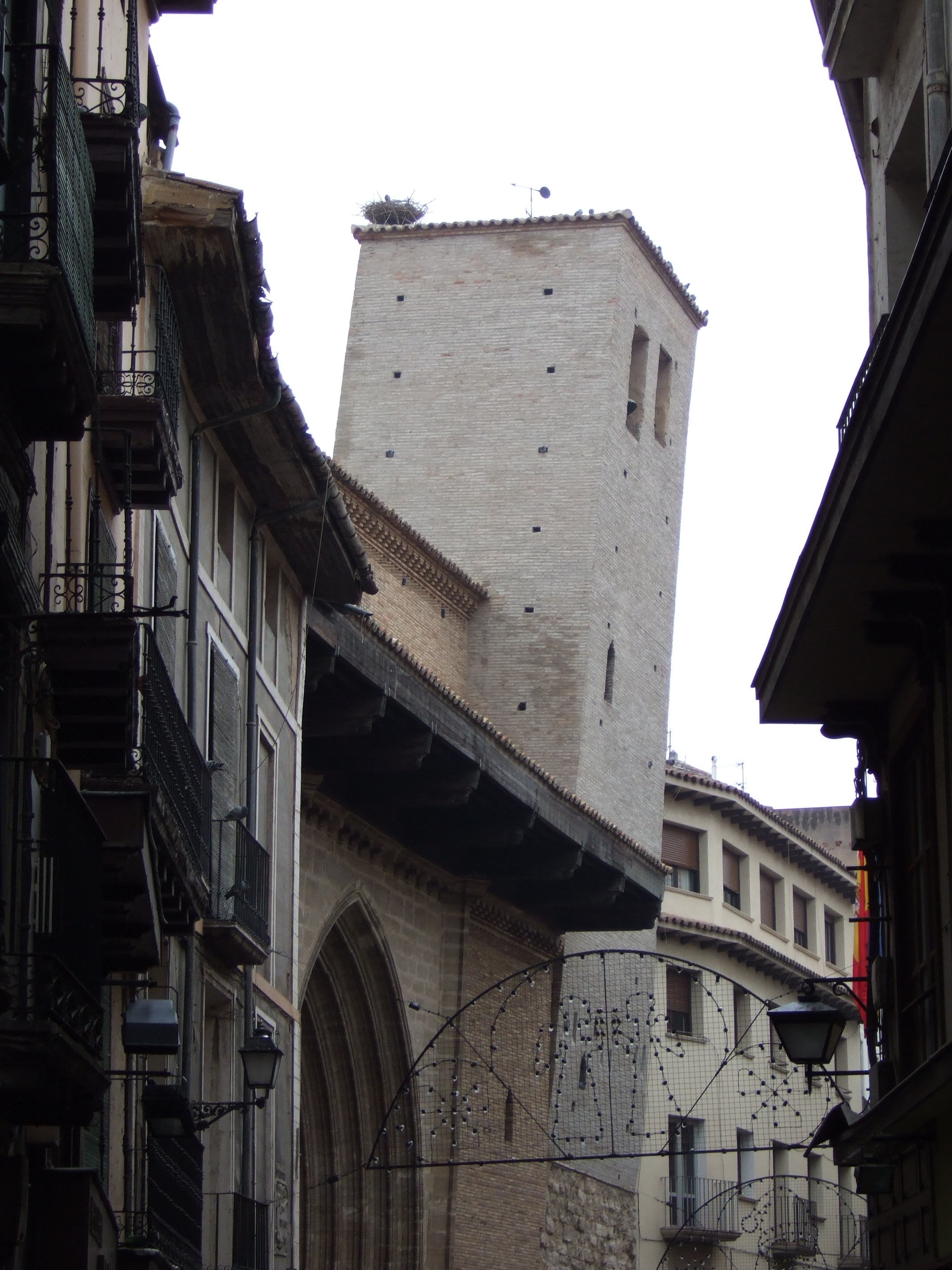
Mudéjar Tower, San Pedro del los Francos, Catalayud, Aragon, Spain

=== Spain ===
- Mudéjar Tower of San Pedro del los Francos, Catalayud, Aragon
- The demolished Leaning Tower of Zaragoza, was, while it existed, the most famous Spanish leaning tower. Demolished in 1892.
- Mudéjar Clock Tower of Ateca, Aragon
- Gate of Europe, two mutually inclined skyscrapers in Madrid
- The leaning bell tower of the Church of Our Lady of Assumption in Bujalance, Andalusia

=== Switzerland ===
- The Leaning Tower of St. Moritz, remaining bell tower of St. Mauritius Church (16th century) that was demolished in 1893.

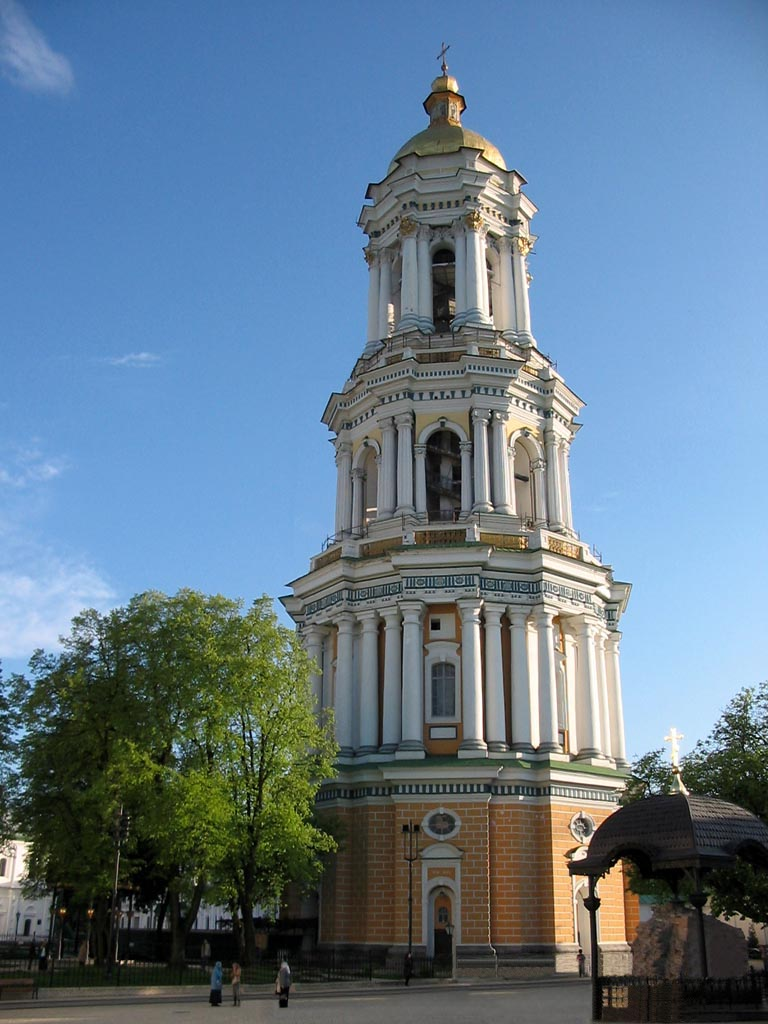
Belltower of Great Lavra, Kyiv, Ukraine

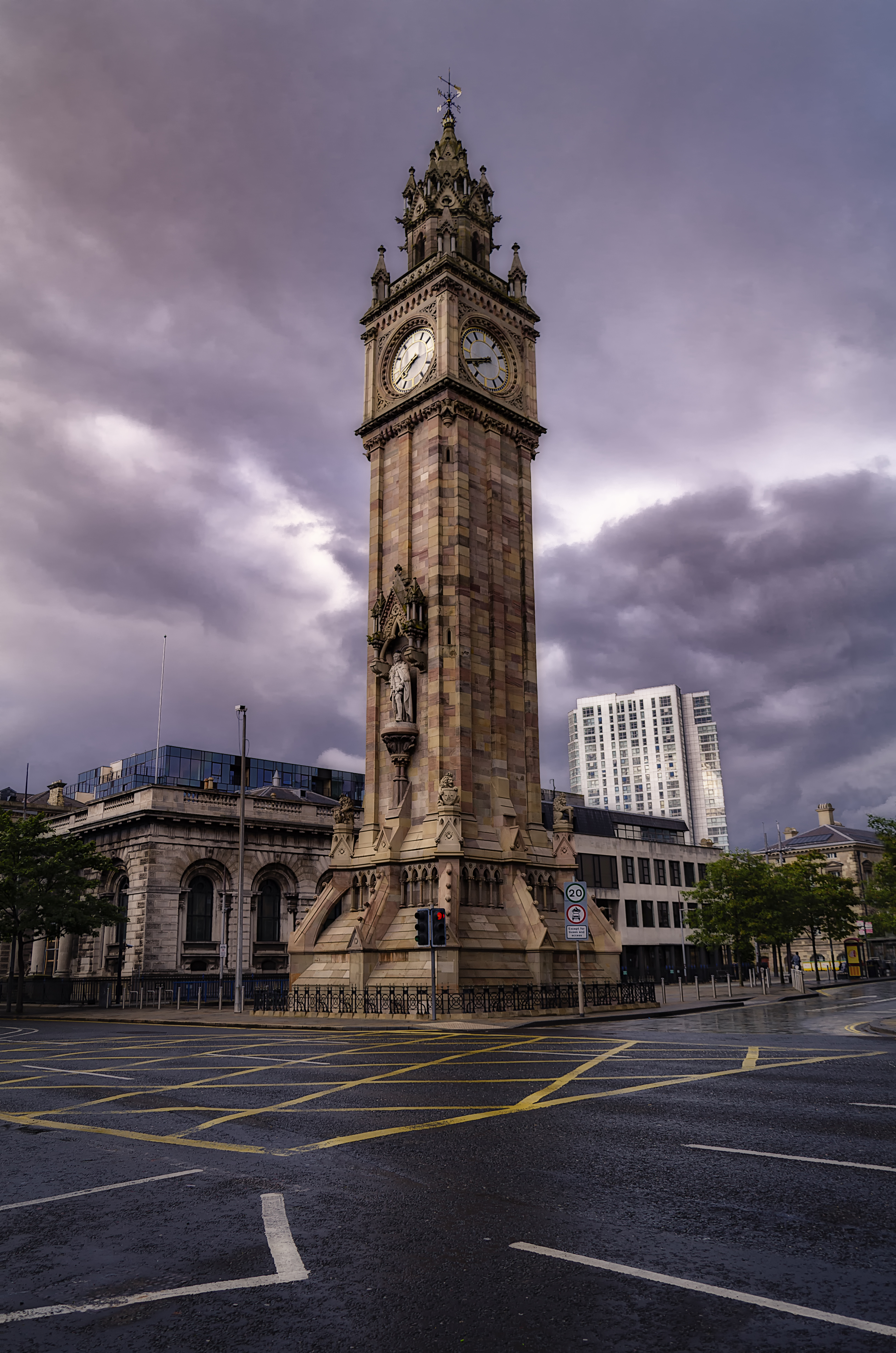
Albert Clock, Belfast, Northern Ireland, UK

=== Ukraine ===
- Belltower of Great Lavra in Kyiv
- Belltower of Saint Lawrence's Church in Zhovkva

=== United Kingdom ===
- 2 Adelaide St (multi-purpose building with Bank of Ireland as anchor tenant), Belfast, Northern Ireland
- The Albert Memorial Clock in Belfast, Northern Ireland
- Bateman's Tower in Brightlingsea, Essex, England
- The great tower of Bridgnorth Castle, in the town of Bridgnorth, Shropshire, England
- The southeast tower of Caerphilly Castle, Wales
- The spire of the Church of St Mary and All Saints, Chesterfield
- The Greyfriars Tower in King's Lynn
- The tower of St Clement's Church in Sutton-on-Sea, Lincolnshire, England

== North America ==
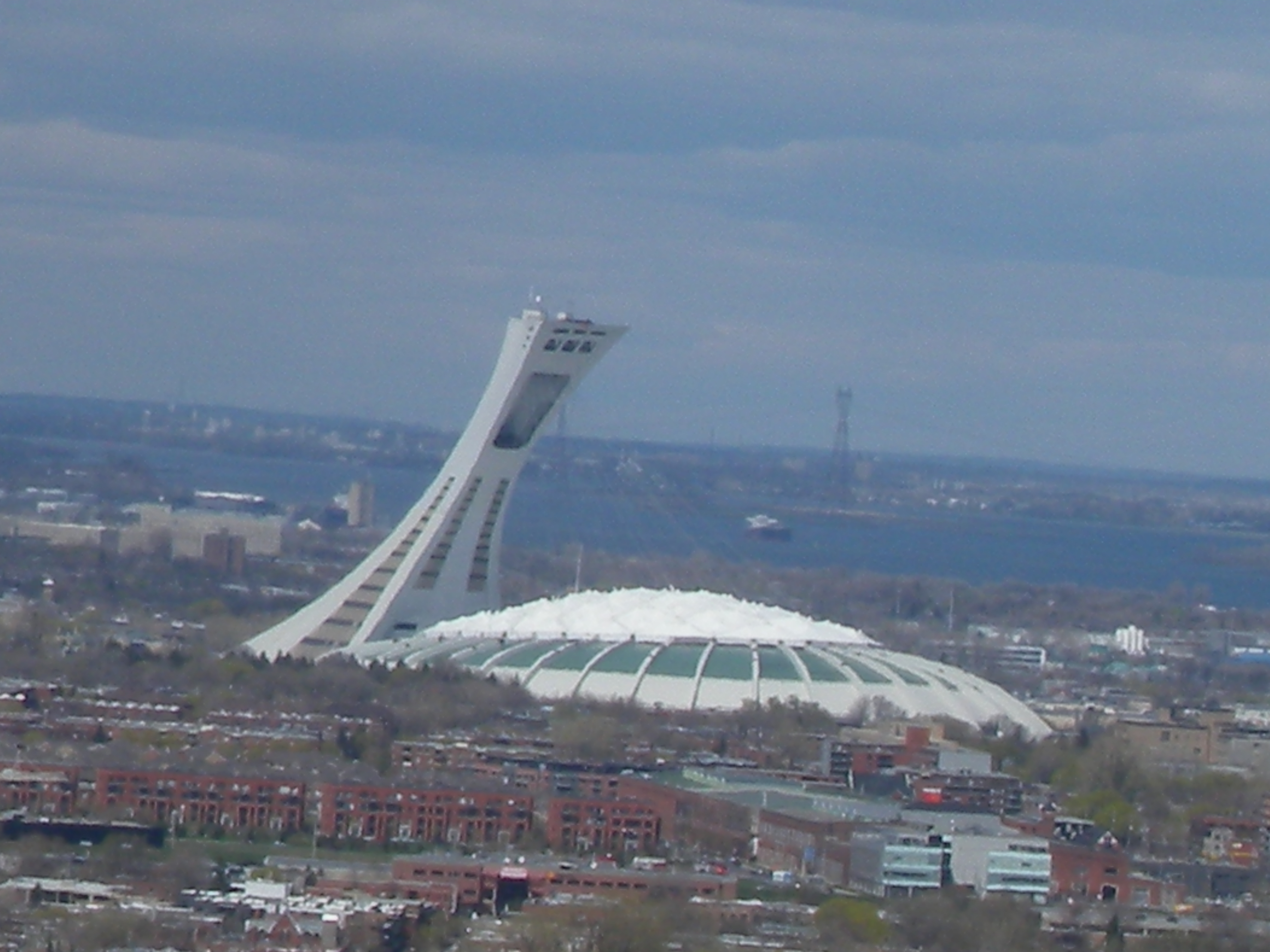
The Olympic Stadium, Montreal, Canada

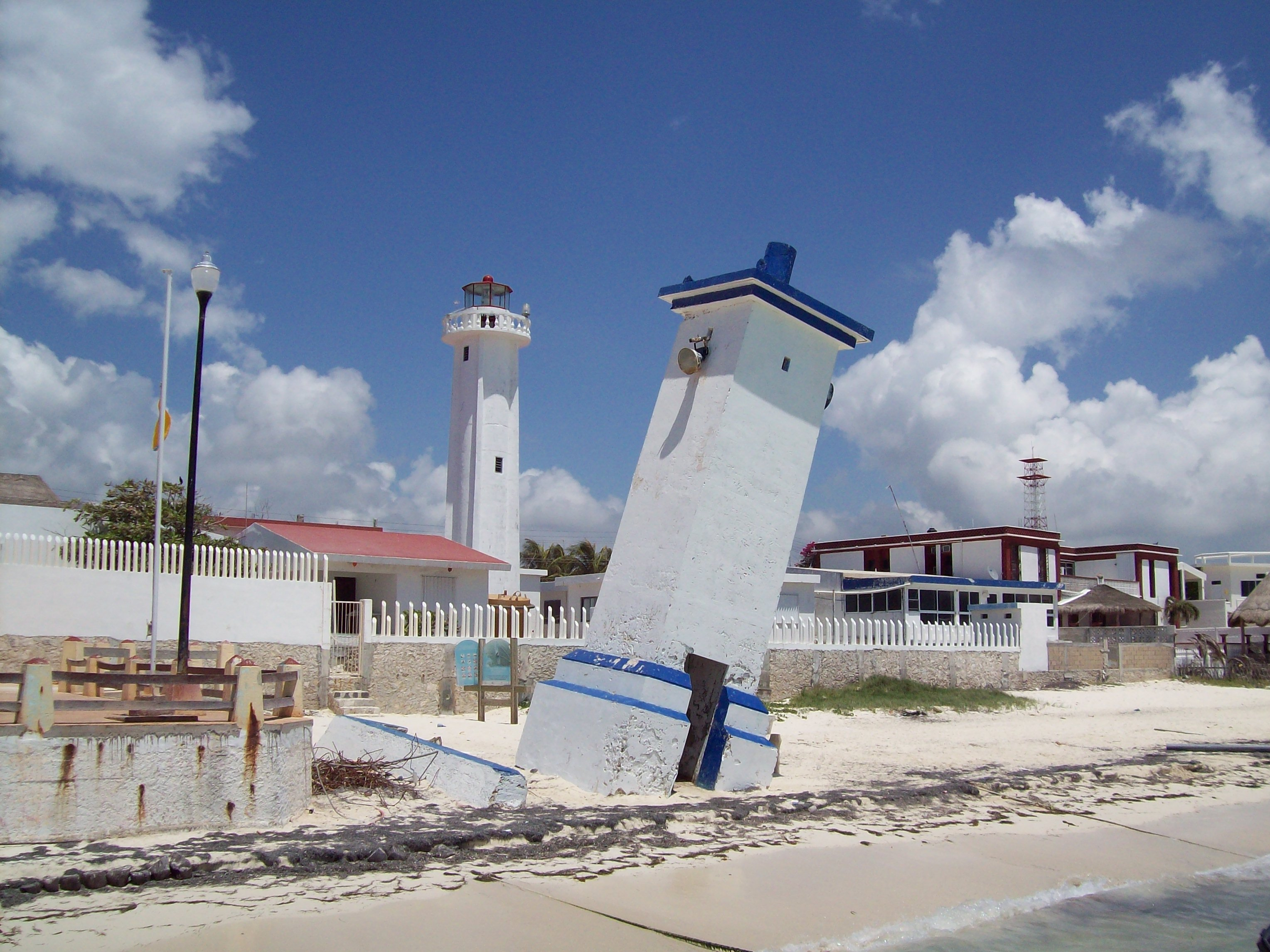
Puerto Morelos Lighthouse, Riviera Maya, Mexico

=== Canada ===
- The Olympic Stadium Tower, the tallest deliberately leaning tower, Montréal, Québec
- The Saint-Léonard Tower (and associated public market), Saint-Léonard, Québec (demolished)

=== Mexico ===
- Puerto Morelos Lighthouse of 1946 on Riviera Maya in the state of Quintana Roo, leaning since 1967

=== United States ===
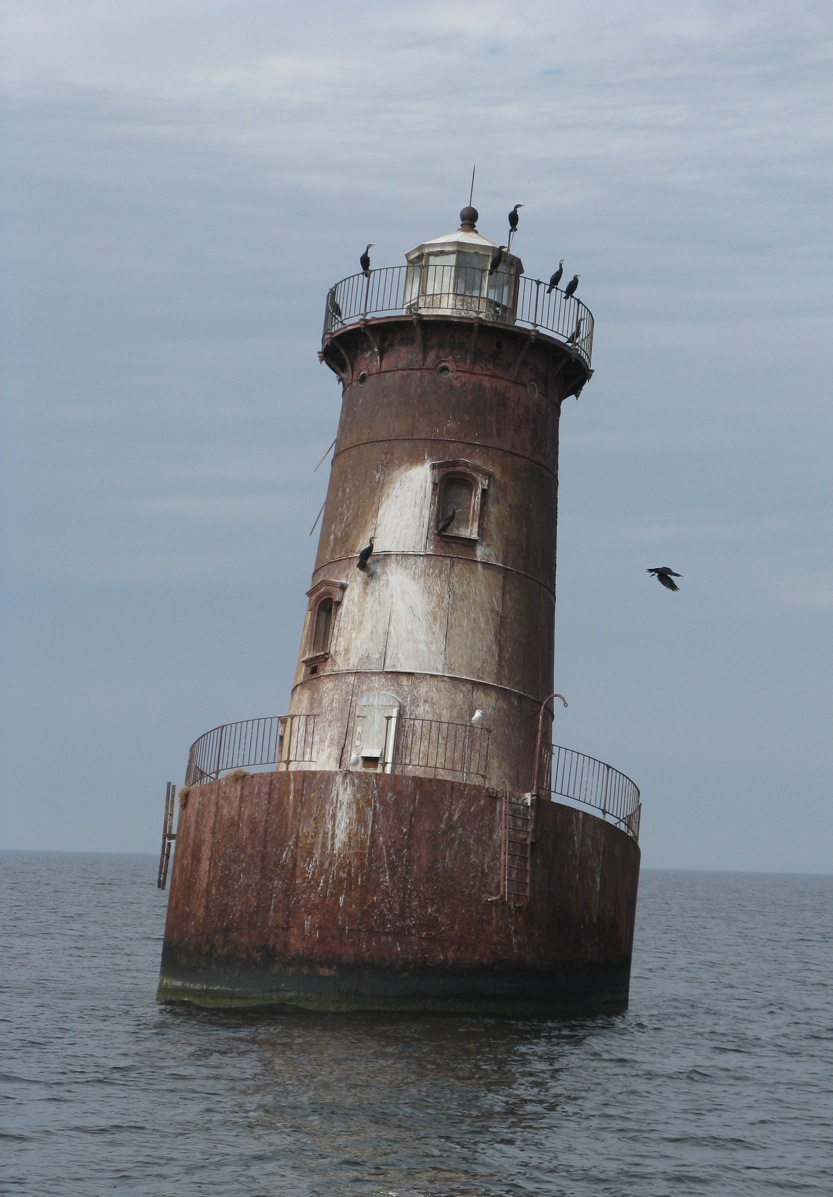
Sharps Light, Chesapeake Bay

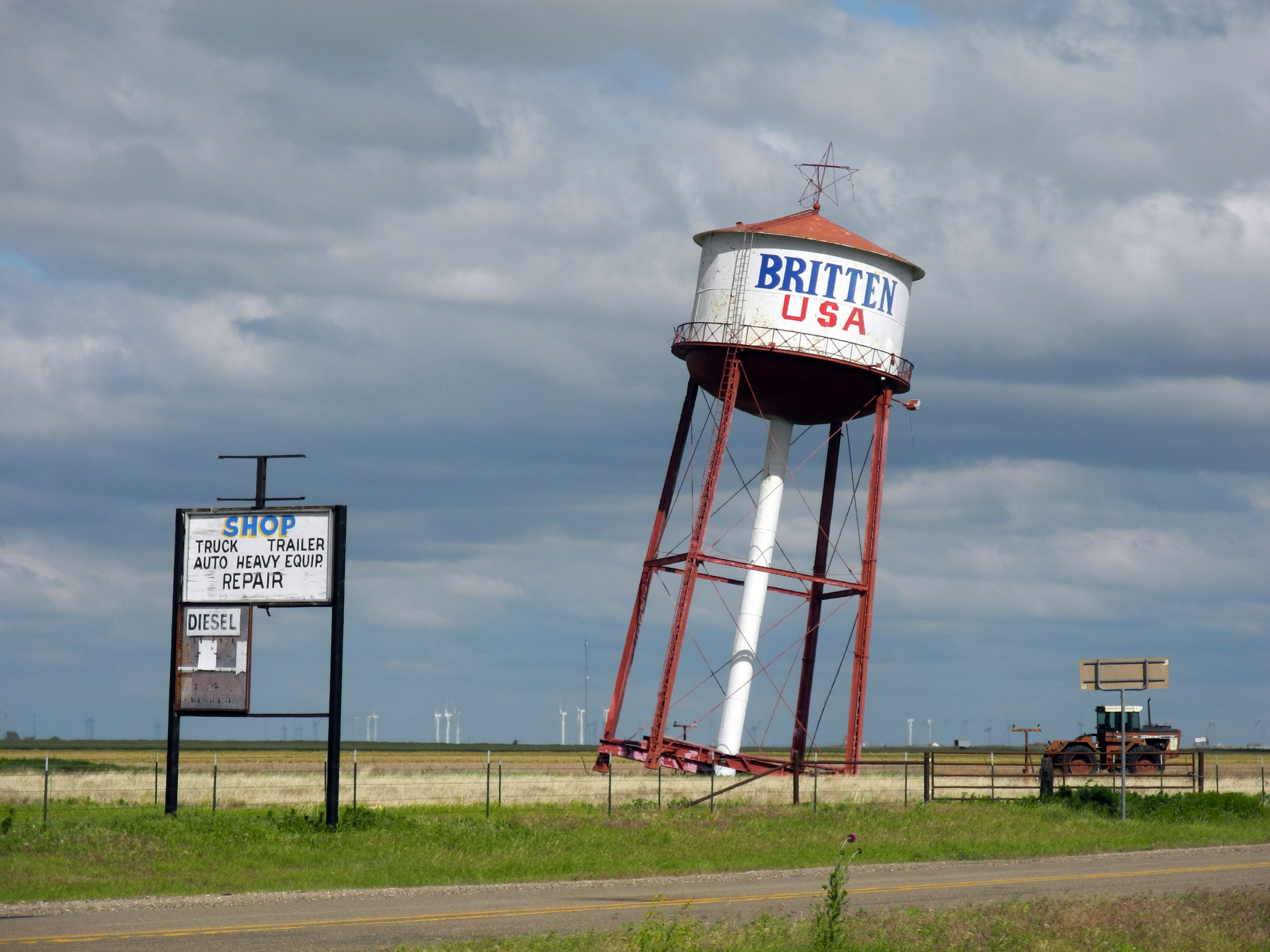
Leaning Tower of Britten, Groom, Texas

- The Leaning Tower of Niles, in Niles, Illinois; a replica of the Leaning Tower of Pisa
- The "Leaning Tower of Patchogue", a nickname given to the former PD Tower at the LIRR station in Patchogue, New York; it was demolished in 2006
- The Leaning Tower of Britten, in Groom, Texas
- The Leaning Tower of Dallas in Dallas, Texas, a now demolished core of a 11-story building that remained erect but slightly leaning after a building demolition.
- 161 Maiden Lane under construction in New York City
- The Millennium Tower in San Francisco; an examination in 2016 showed the building had sunk 16 inches, with a two-inch tilt towards the north west
- The Ocean Tower (The Leaning Tower of South Padre Island), in South Padre Island, Texas (demolished)
- Sharps Island Light, 3 miles off the southern end of Tilghman Island, in Maryland's Chesapeake Bay, has been leaning 15° since it was damaged by an ice floe in 1977
- Haskell Road house, a house in Nevada City, CA with unusual foundation settling and/or compromised shear design.

== Africa ==
=== South Africa ===
- The clock tower on Cape Town's waterfront.

== Oceania ==
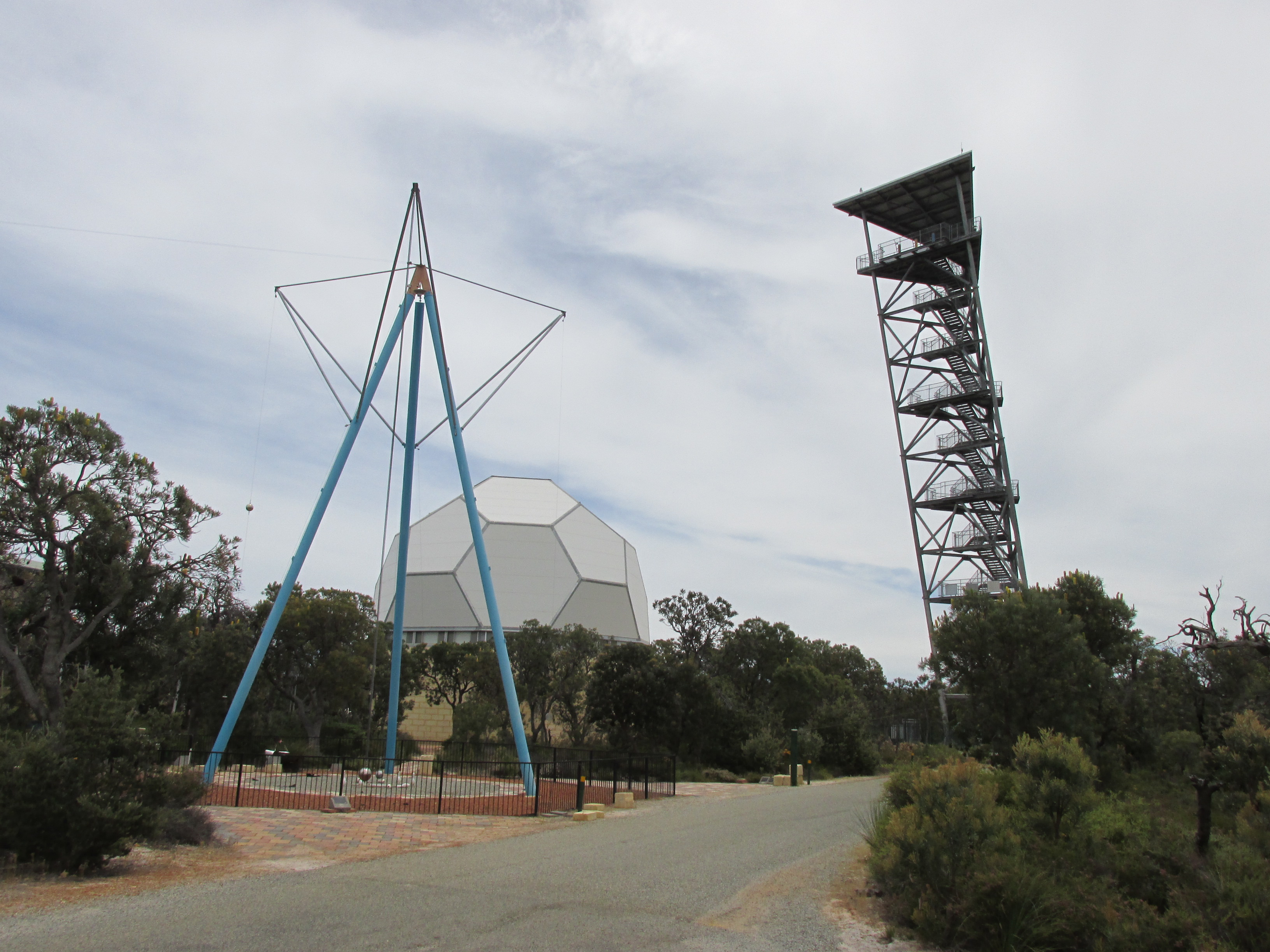
Leaning Tower, Gravity Discovery Centre, Gingin, Australia

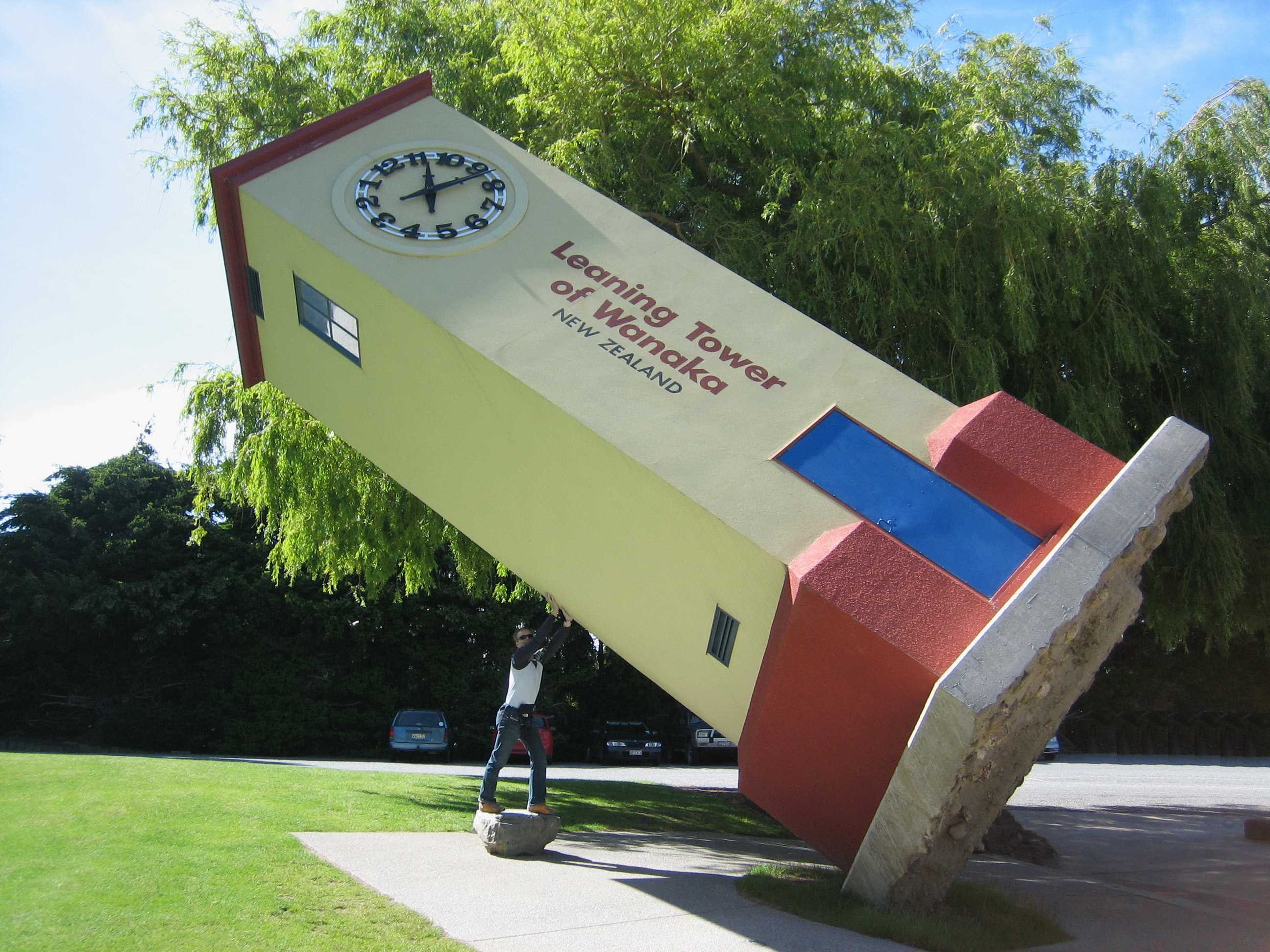
Leaning Tower, Puzzling World, Wānaka, New Zealand

=== Australia ===
- The Leaning Tower at the Gravity Discovery Centre in Gingin

=== New Zealand ===
- The Hotel Grand Chancellor, Christchurch (demolished in 2012 after the 2011 Christchurch Earthquake)
- The Leaning Tower of Wanaka at the Puzzling World in Wānaka

== See also ==
- Inclined building
- Inclined tower
- Crooked spire
