= Leaning Tower of Toruń =

- Krzywa Wieża w Toruniu
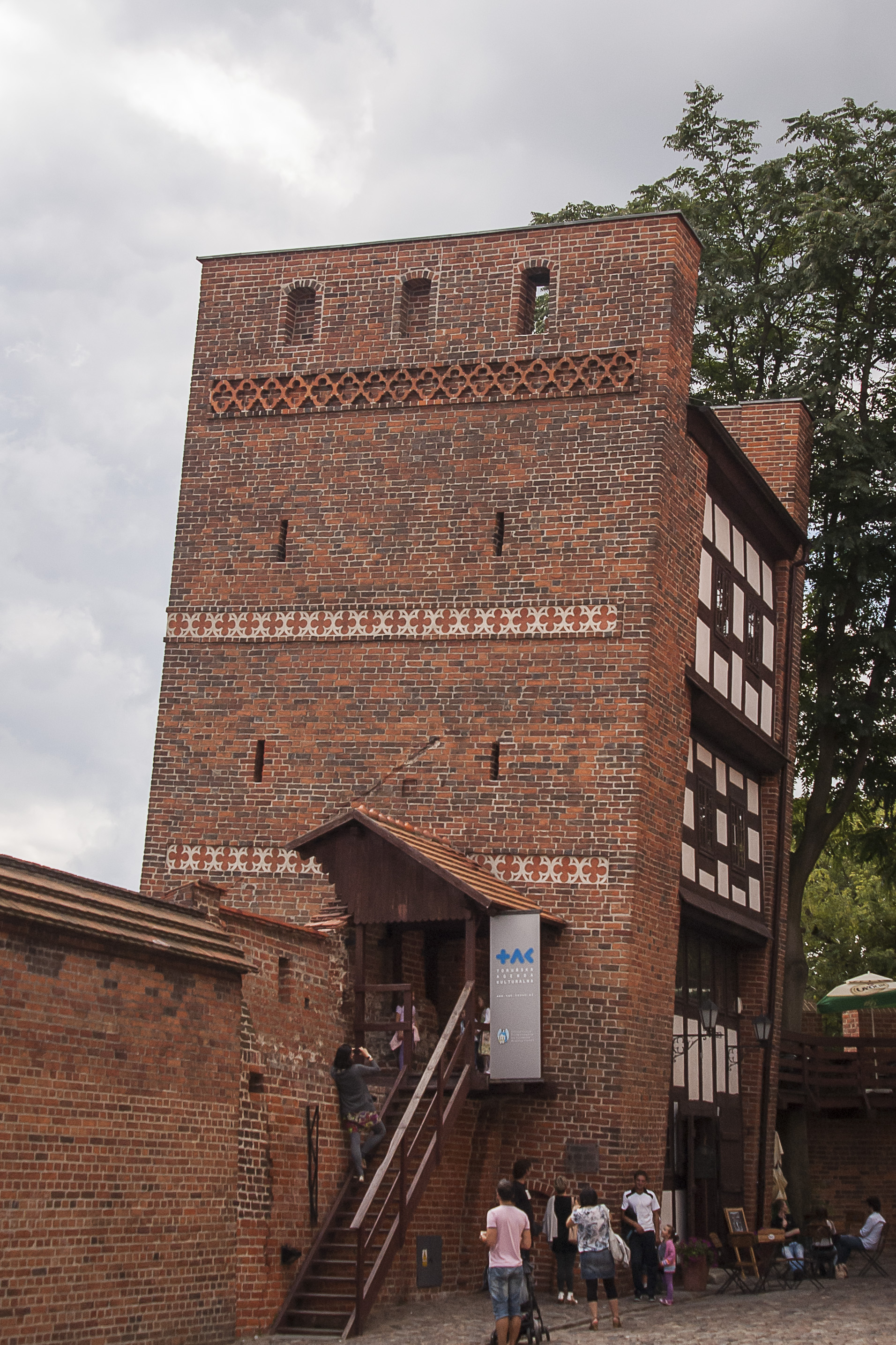
- The Leaning Tower of Toruń, viewed from the east

- Location within Poland

General information
- Type: Fortified tower
- Architectural style: Gothic
- Location: Toruń, Poland
- Coordinates: 53°0′30.04″N 18°36′7.92″E
- Construction started: 13th century
- Renovated: 19th century

Height
- Height: 15 m (49 ft)

Technical details
- Material: Red brick

UNESCO World Heritage Site
- Type: Cultural
- Criteria: ii, iv
- Designated: 1997
- Part of: Medieval Town of Toruń
- Reference no.: 835
- UNESCO region: Europe

Historic Monument of Poland
- Designated: 8 September 1994
- Part of: Toruń – Old and New Town
- Reference no.: M.P. z 1994 r. Nr 50, poz. 422

The Leaning Tower of Toruń (Polish: Krzywa Wieża w Toruniu) is a medieval tower in Toruń, Poland. It is known as a leaning tower because the top of the tower is displaced 1.5 metres (4 ft 11 in) from where it would be if the tower were perfectly vertical. Located on Pod Krzywą Wieżą street, it is one of the most important landmarks in Toruń's Old Town. As part of the Medieval Town of Toruń it is listed as a UNESCO World Heritage Site and a Historic Monument of Poland.

== History ==
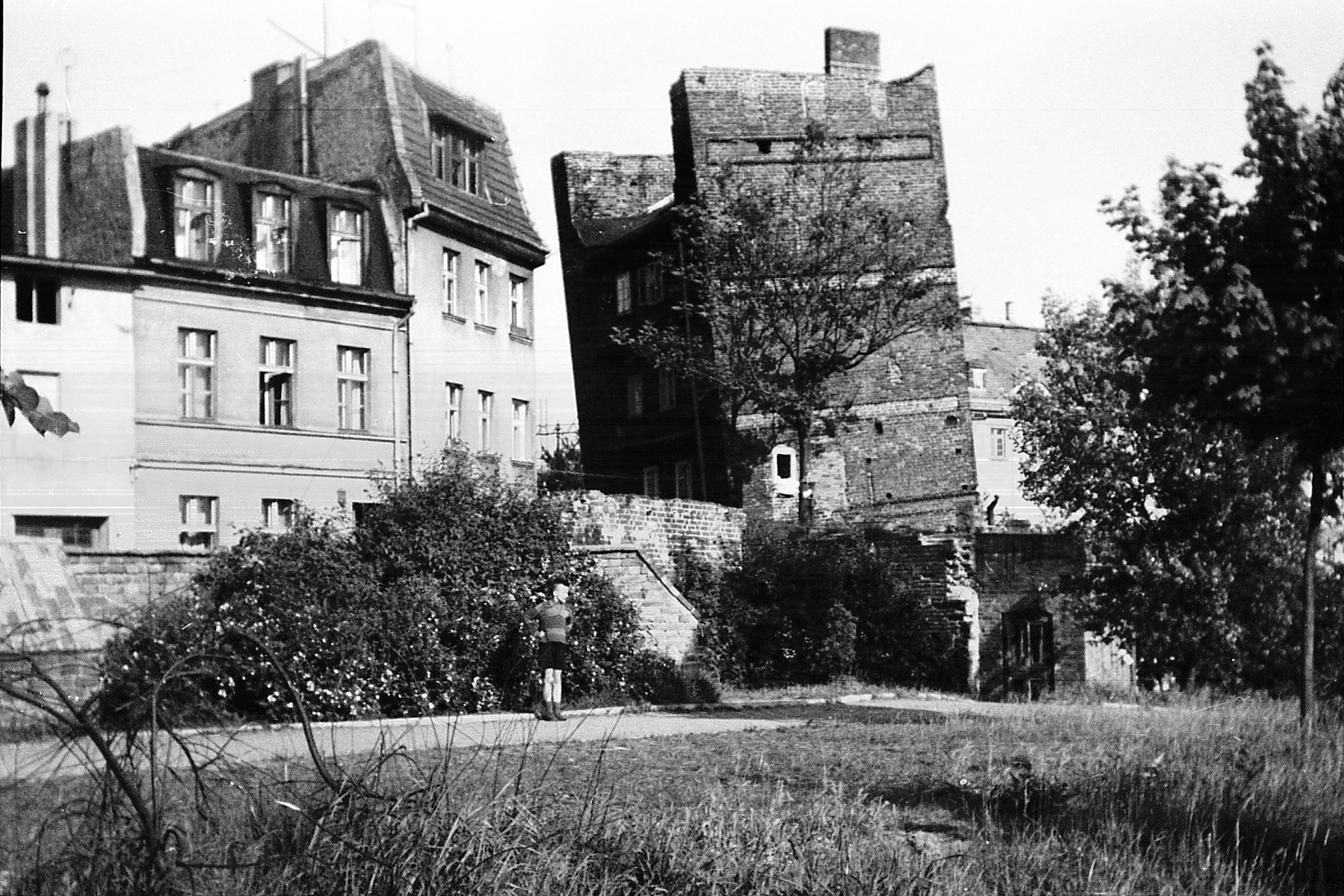
The Leaning Tower of Toruń in 1961

The Leaning Tower of Toruń was built in the 13th century in order to defend the town. It was built of red brick. It started leaning because it was built on loamy ground. In the 18th century it ceased to be used for defensive purposes. The tower was then converted into a women's prison. In the 19th century, it housed a blacksmith's shop and an apartment for a gunsmith. At this time, the Gothic tented roof was replaced by a pitched roof. A souvenir shop and a café used to be located in the tower in the 1970s and 80s, and now it houses the Toruń Cultural Department.

== Legends ==
Some legends are associated with the Leaning Tower of Toruń, which are narrated by tour guides to visitors:

- The sin of the Teutonic Knight: In the tower, there lived 12 knights of the Order of Teutonic Knights, who were forbidden to meet with women. However, one monk fell in love with the daughter of a rich merchant, and met her in secret, thus breaking the monastic rule of the Order. The residents of the town discovered this and reported them to the commander and the city authorities. Both lovers were fined, the woman was sentenced to 25 lashes, and the knight was ordered to build a tower. However, the tower had to be tilted, in the same way as his conduct had deviated from the monastic rule. To this day, legend has it that those who have sinned are not able to keep their balance under the tower.
- Origin of the name of the city: According to another legend, the tower was a friend of the river Wisła, and loved listening to interesting stories told by the river. With time, the river started getting closer to the tower and eroding its walls, and the tower started leaning. The tower pleaded with the river to not flow so close to it, because it might fall down, but the river said, "So fall down, then!". The river's cries were heard by wanderers who wondered what was the city with high walls that they could see on the horizon, and they called the city Toruń (which means "So fall down, then!", in Polish).

== See also ==
- Nicolaus Copernicus Monument, Toruń
