= Leaning Tower of Britten =

Water tower in Groom, Texas

Coordinates: 35°11′53″N 101°04′55″W

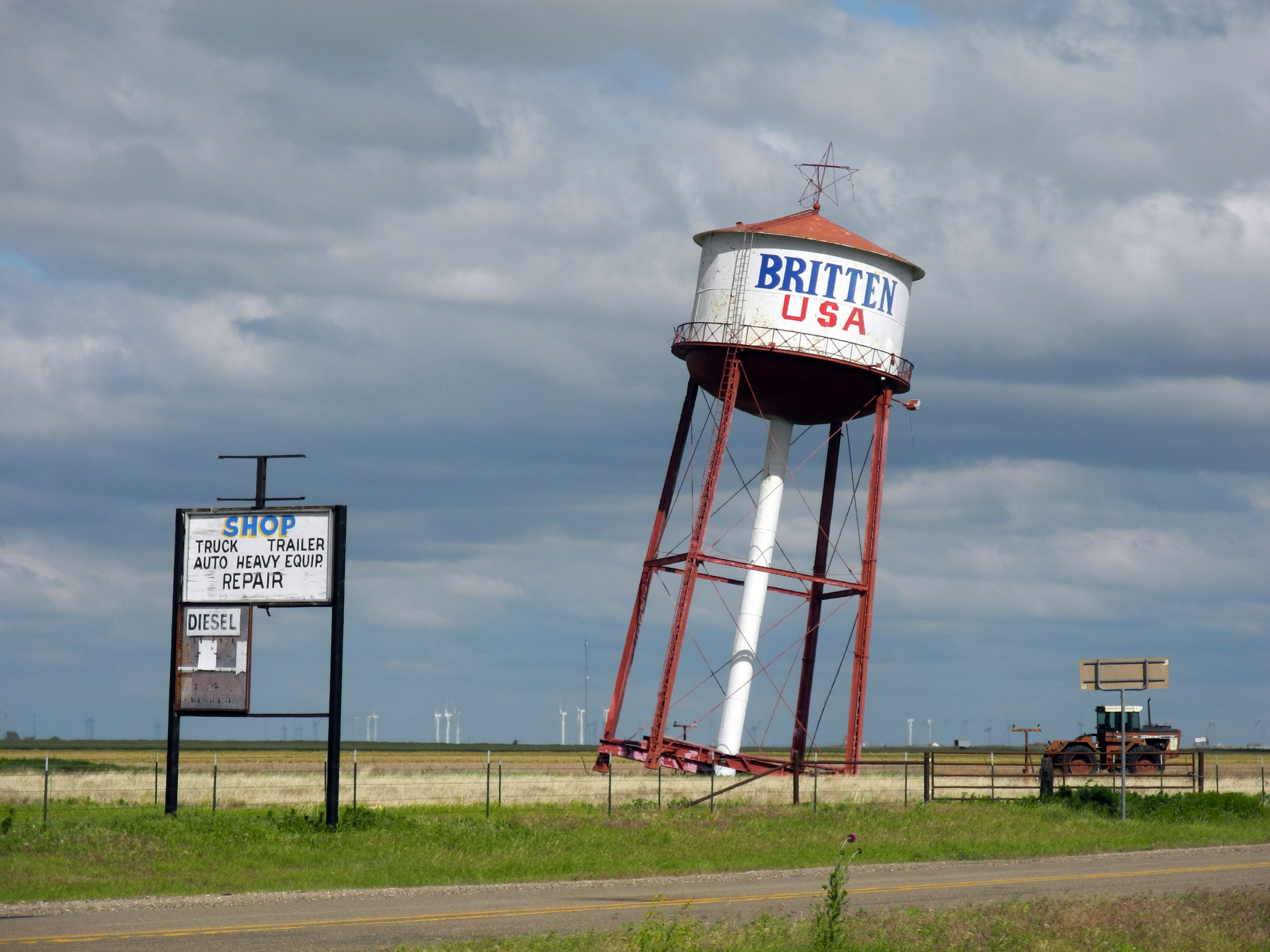
The Leaning Tower of Britten (with unlit star on the top), found east of Groom along I-40 (old U.S. Route 66), May 2017

The Leaning Tower of Britten is a leaning water tower which serves as a roadside attraction and decorative item along historic U.S. Route 66 in Groom, Texas. Sometimes called the Leaning Tower of Texas, the tower was originally a functioning water tower slated for demolition until Ralph Britten purchased and moved it to serve as an advertisement for his truck stop and tourist information center. The Leaning Tower Truck Stop closed in the mid-1980s after an electrical fire damaged it; a small remaining portion operates as a local truck repair shop.

Deliberately leaning at a roughly 10-degree angle, the tower is a popular tourist destination. A small gravel road is on the site for parking and taking pictures. During Christmas, the city of Groom lights the large multicolored star on top of the tower. Images of the water tower are common in Route 66 photography books.
