= Church of San Pedro de los Francos =

Church in Calatayud, Aragon, Spain

- Iglesia de San Pedro de los Francos (Spanish)
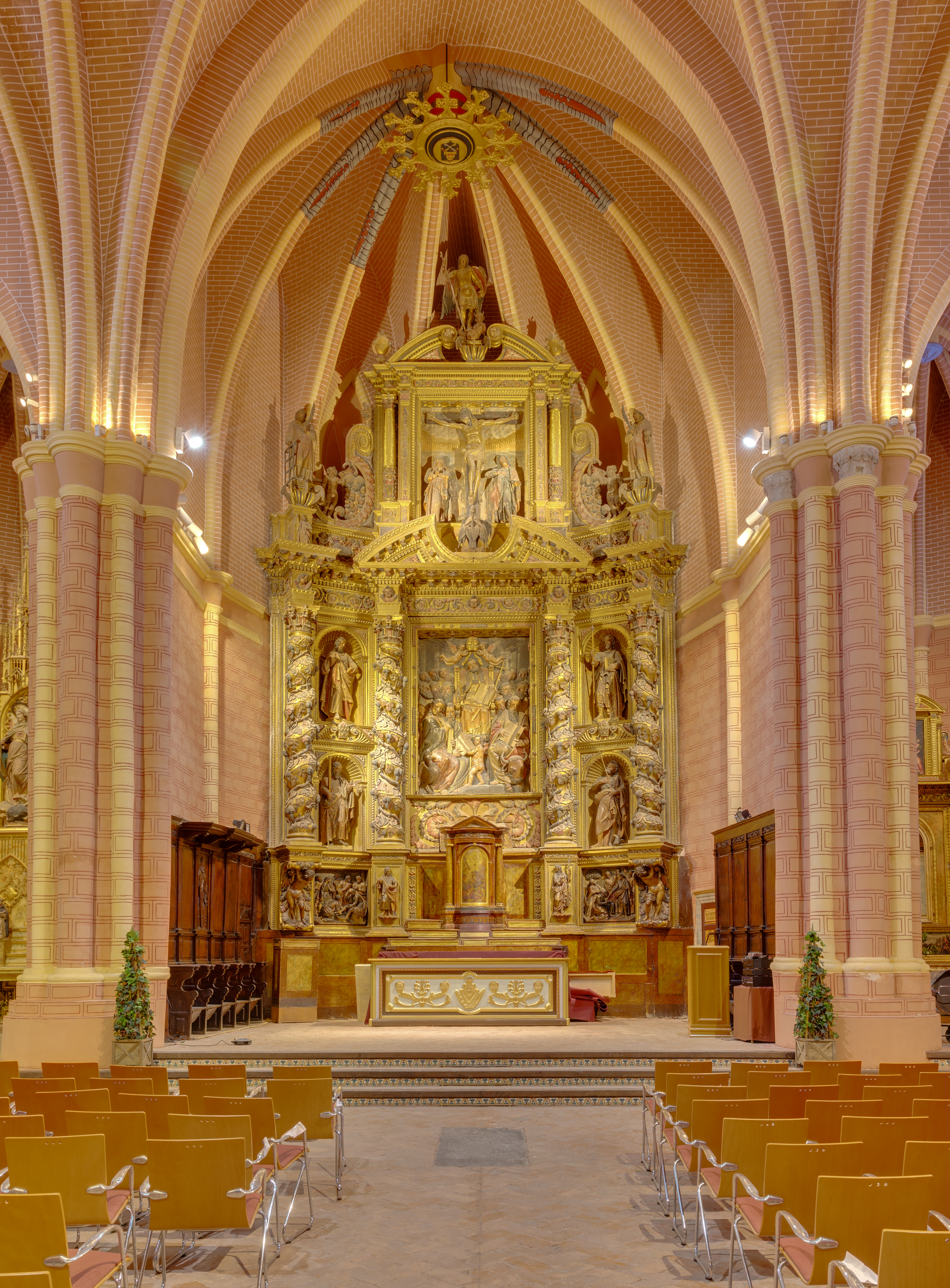
- Main altar and apse.

- Location within Spain
- 41.35312°N 1.643321°W
- Location: Calatayud, Spain

Spanish Cultural Heritage
- Official name: Iglesia de San Pedro de los Francos
- Type: Non-movable
- Criteria: Monument
- Designated: 1875
- Reference no.: RI-51-0000013

The Church of San Pedro de los Francos (Spanish: Iglesia de San Pedro de los Francos) is a church located on Via la Rua in Calatayud, Spain. It was declared Bien de Interés Cultural in 1875.

== History ==
The church was founded by Alfonso I el Batallador, after the Reconquista of Calatayud, to thank his French mercenary troops. The church was built in the 14th-century over an earlier temple. It has a typical Mudéjar structure of 3 naves and apses.

== Art and Architecture ==
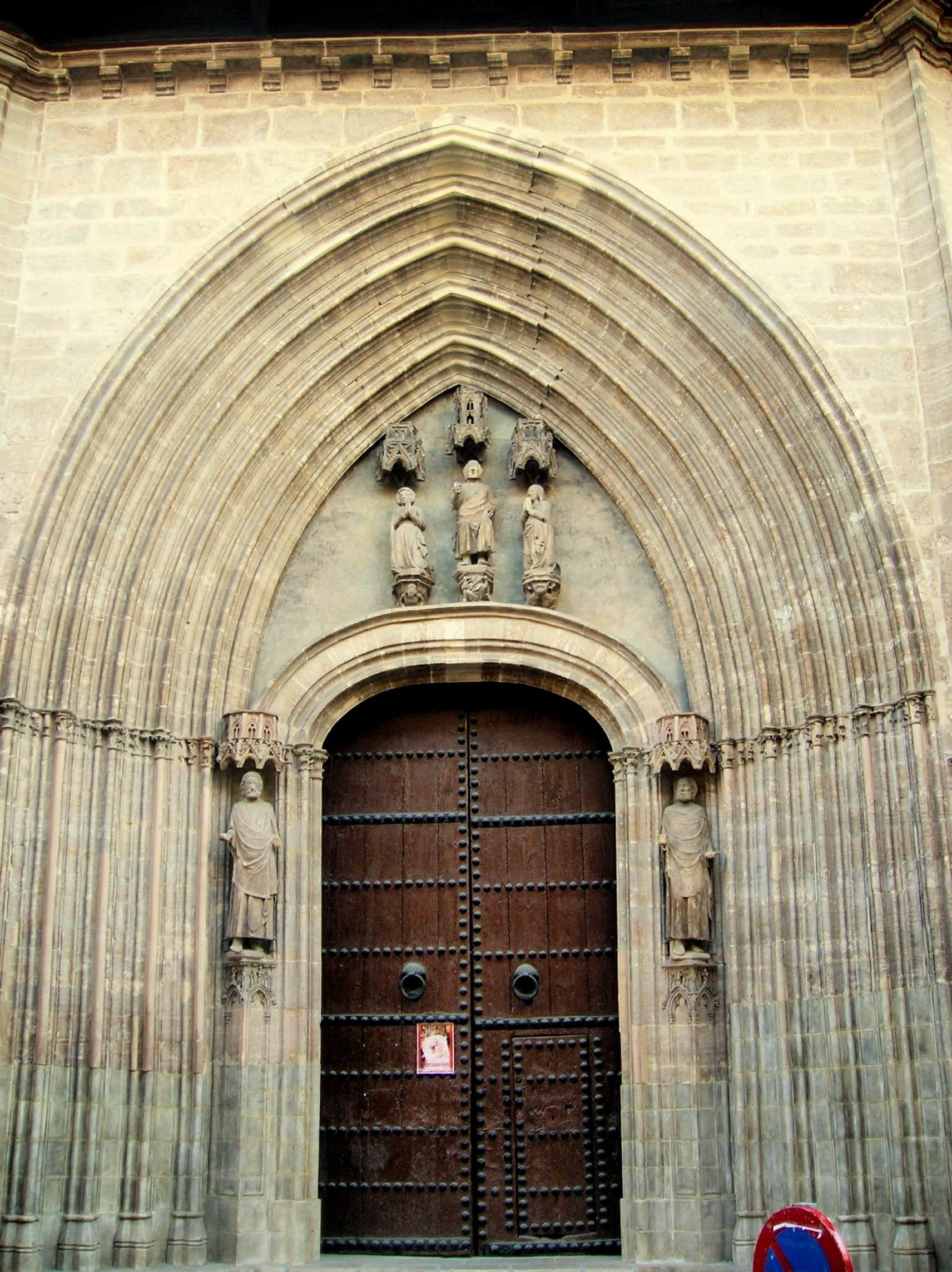
Entrance portal

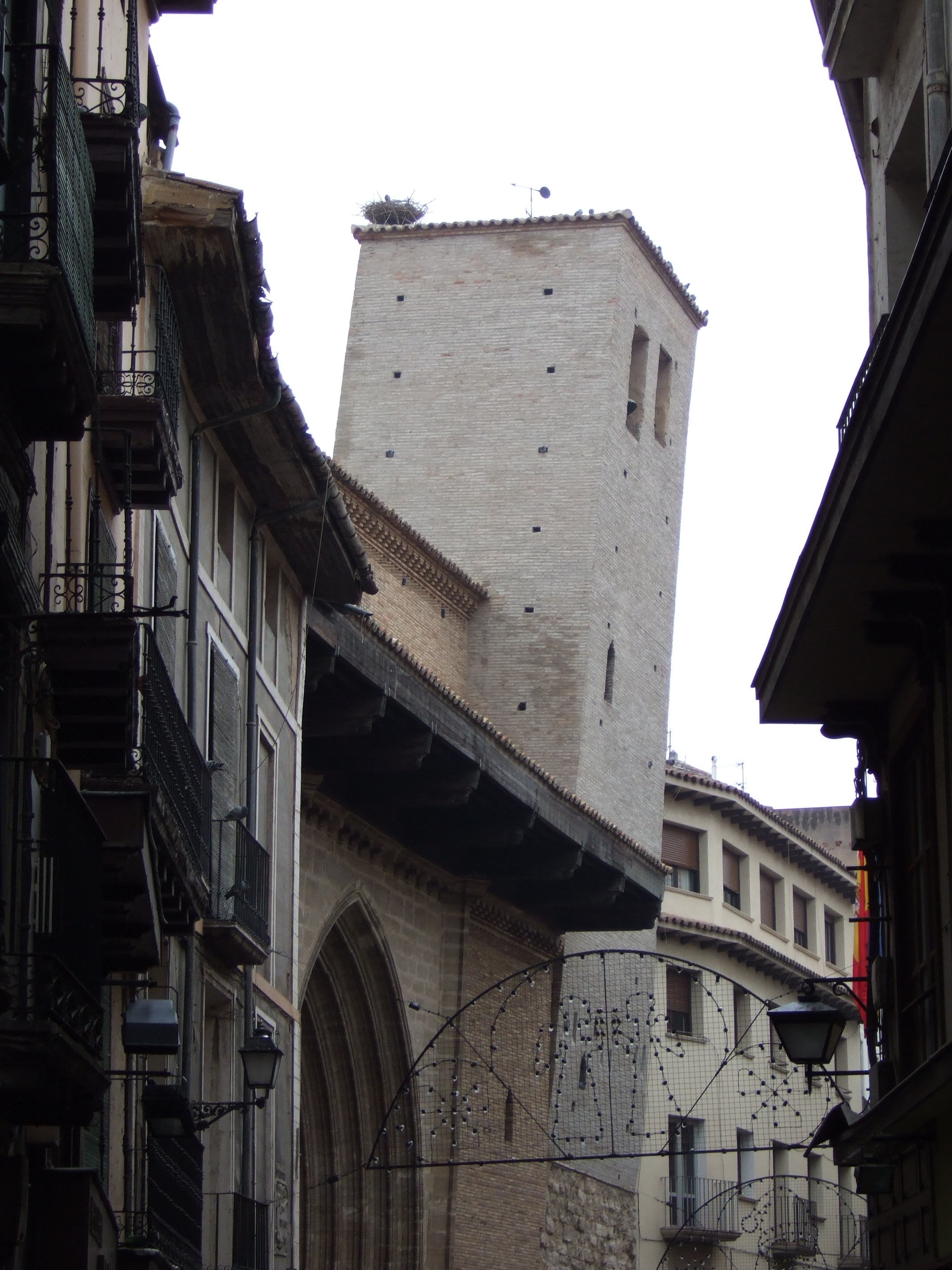
Exterior view

The entrance portal is Gothic in style with a peaked arch flanked by standing sculptures of St Peter and Paul, while the lintel has some awkwardly seated Christ (center), the Virgin and St John, all sheltered by a ledge with architecture.

Inside the main gilded Retablo at the high altar has Baroque Solomonic columns, and was completed in 1654. Other chapels include a retablo with Renaissance style panels. The various chapels include a virgin in a grotto.

The adjacent ancient mudejar tower leans over the street.

== See also ==
- List of Bien de Interés Cultural in the Province of Zaragoza
