= Monastery Gate =

Medieval gate in Toruń, Poland

Coordinates: 53°00′30″N 18°36′13″E

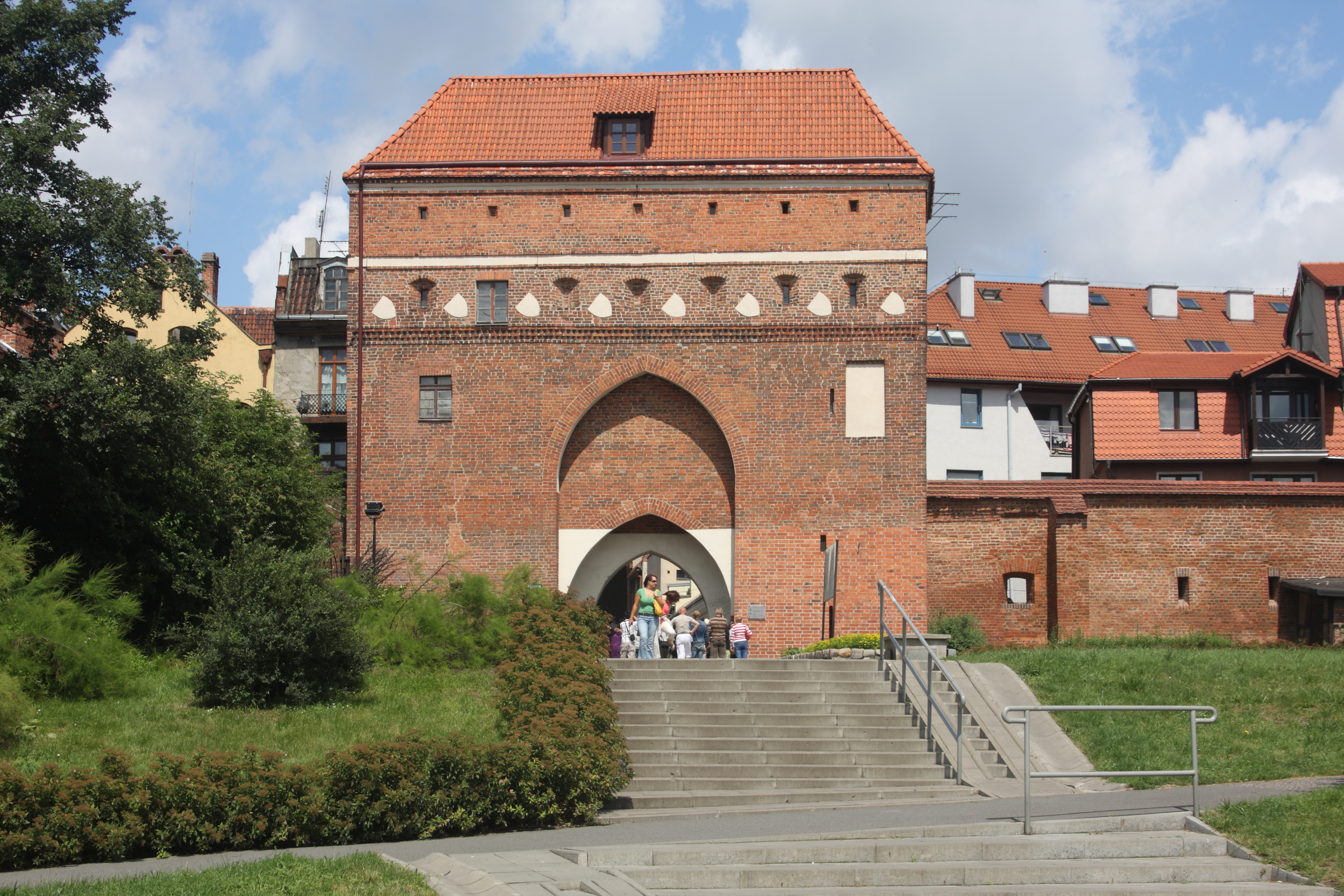
Gate seen from outside of the walls

The Monastery Gate (Polish: Brama Klasztorna) also the Gate of the Holy Spirit or the Gate of the Lady - one of the three gates of medieval Toruń that have survived to this day.

== Location ==
The gate is located in the southern part of the Old Town Complex, at 2a Holy Spirit Street, east of the Leaning Tower (pol. Krzywa Wieża).

== History ==
The gate was erected in the style of the Flemish Gothic, characterized by a bulky structure. Due to its burly appearance, the gate resembles another, no longer existing, gate of the Old Town - the Pauline Gate. The completion of the gate dates back to the 1st half of the 14th century. The development of war technology, especially the spread of firearms, necessitated the extension of the gate, which was completed around 1420. There was a drop gate in a niche on the outside of the gate. Another obstacle was a hole in the ceiling of the gate opening, from which defenders poured, among others, hot groats or oil on possible attackers. Another element was the proper gate, which could be supported from the town side with additional beams if necessary. These beams were immobilized by locking them in specially designed openings in the gate wall.

In the 19th century, the gate, which no longer had any defensive functions, was rebuilt and since then its rooms have been used for residential purposes.

The name of the gate comes from the Benedictine Sisters' Convent, located just outside the city walls, where a hospital and the Holy Spirit Church were built. It existed until the 17th century. Both the gate and the whole street of the Holy Spirit took its name from it. The origin of the street's name is often mistaken with the modern church of the same calling, located at the other end of the street, which was built in 1756 as a Lutheran church dedicated to the Holy Cross.

An air-raid shelter for 100 people has been located under the gate since October 1943 (probably built for port or gasworks workers), currently open to the public.

== Gallery ==
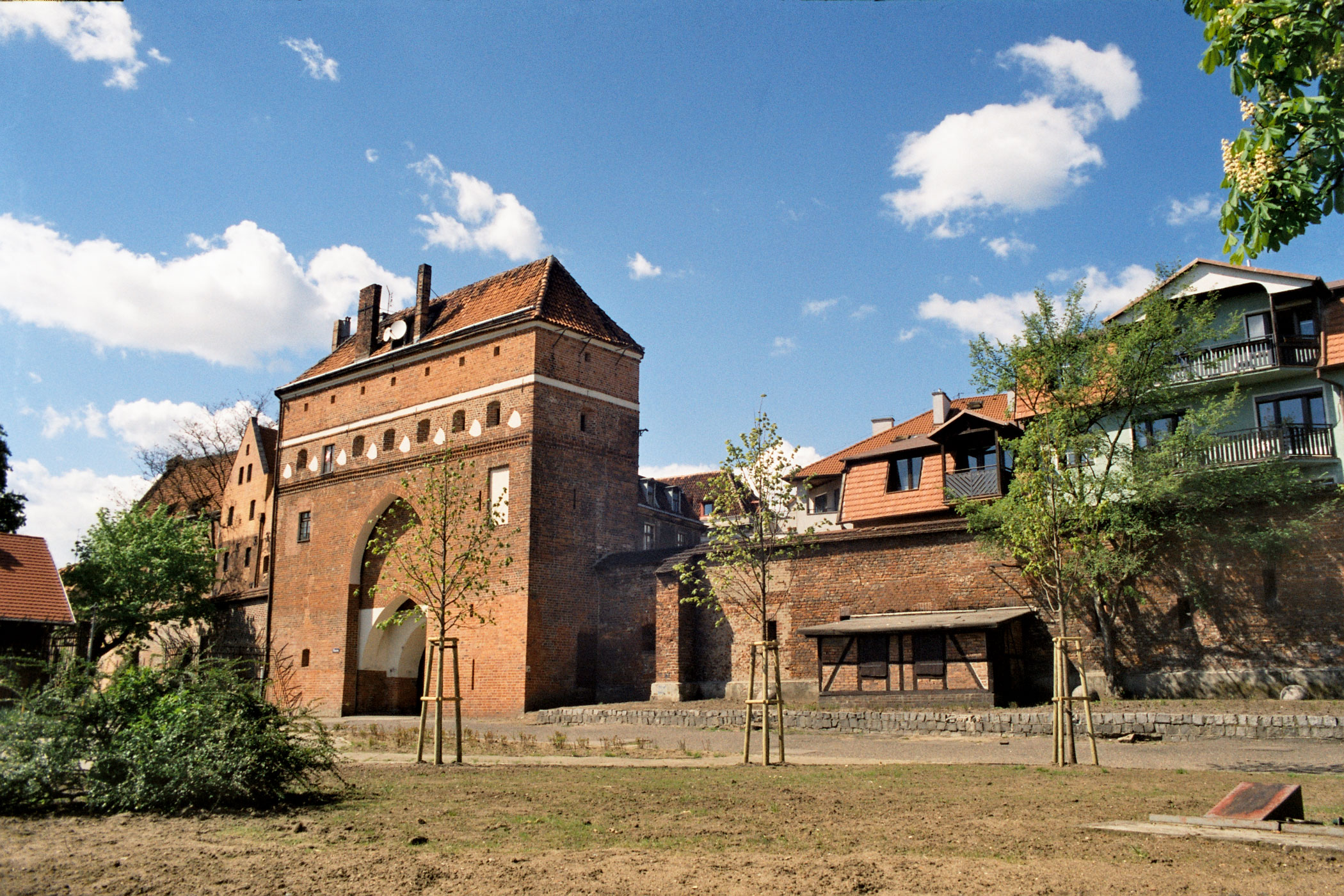
2005

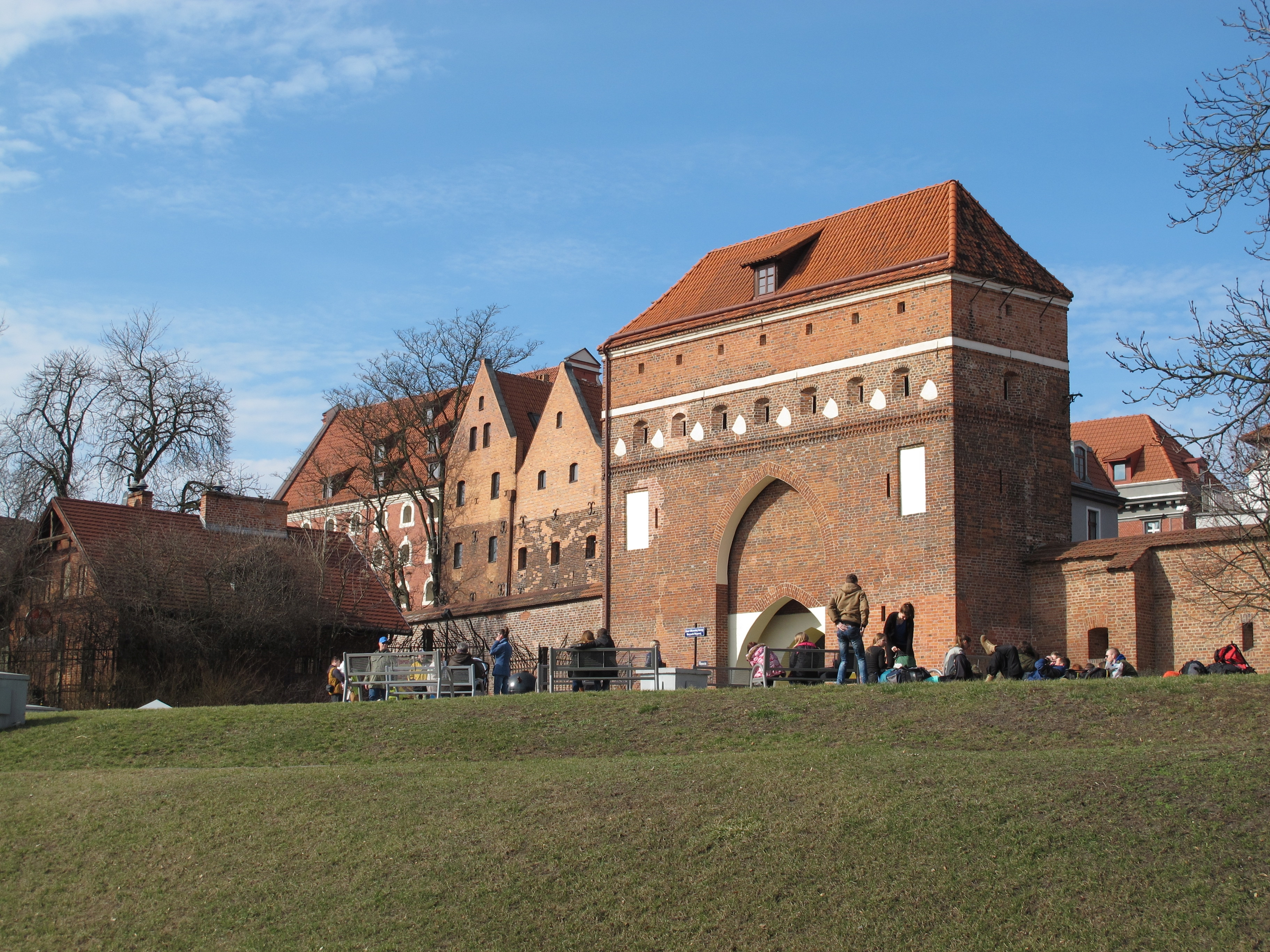
2006

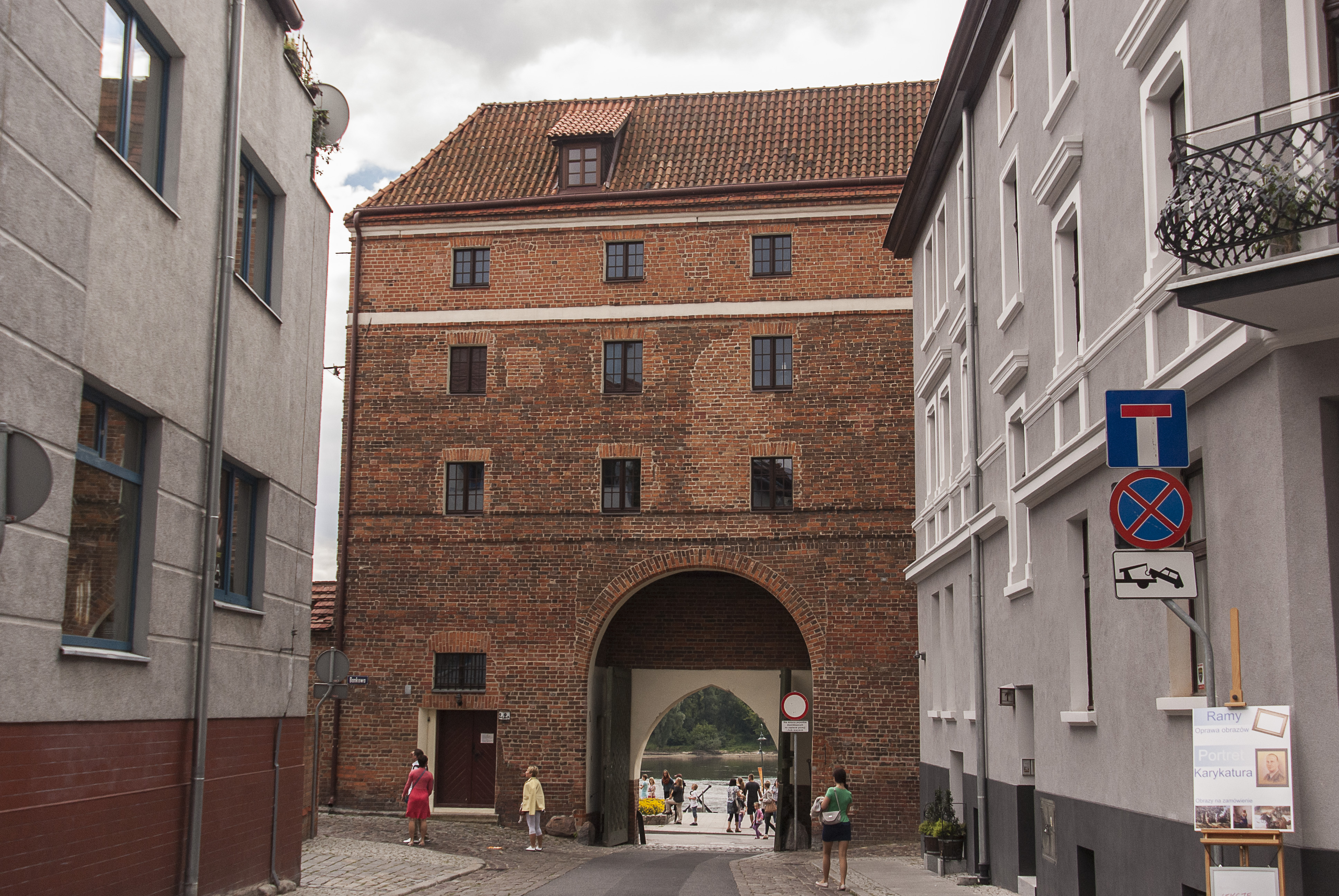
2012

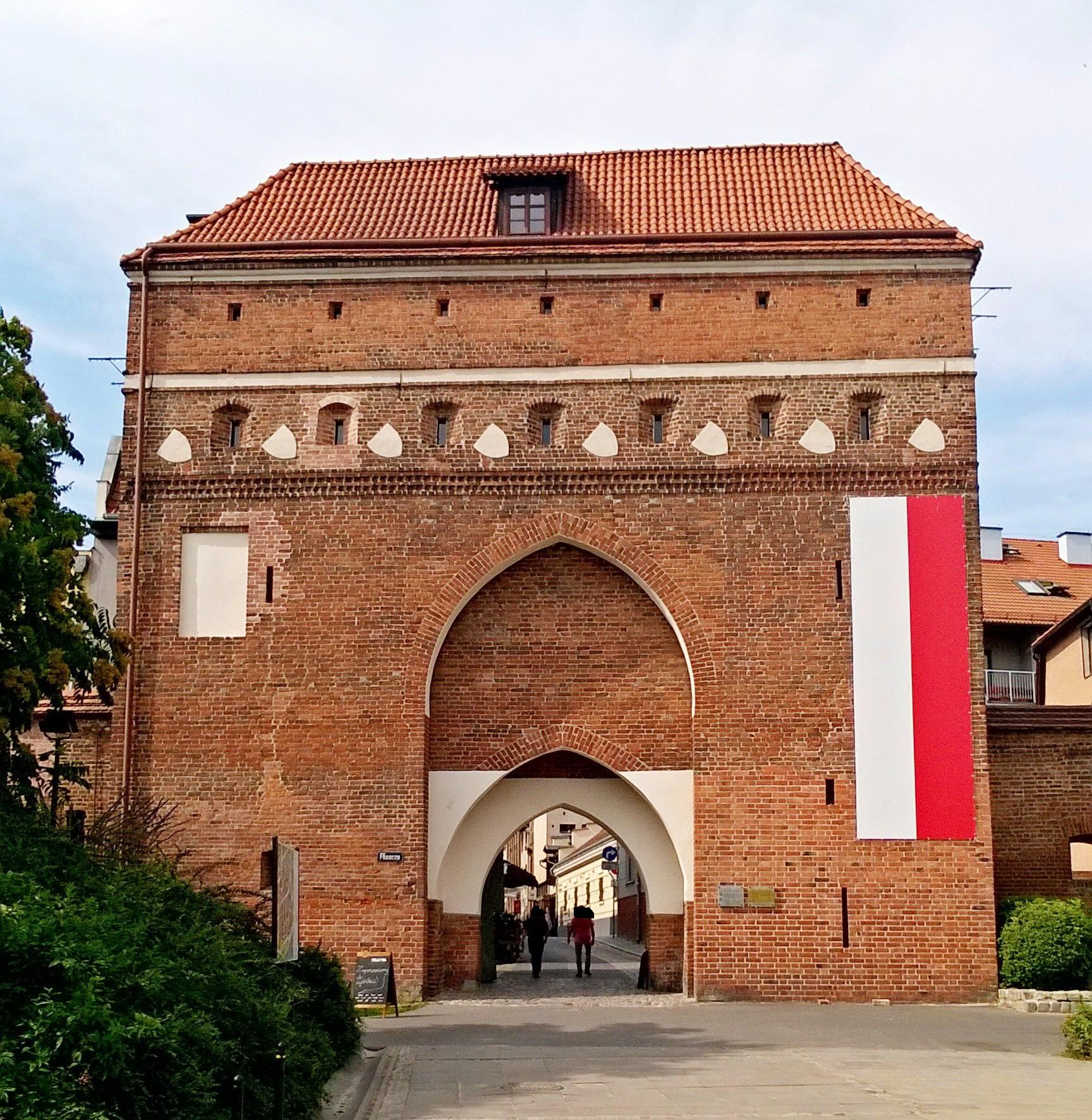
2018

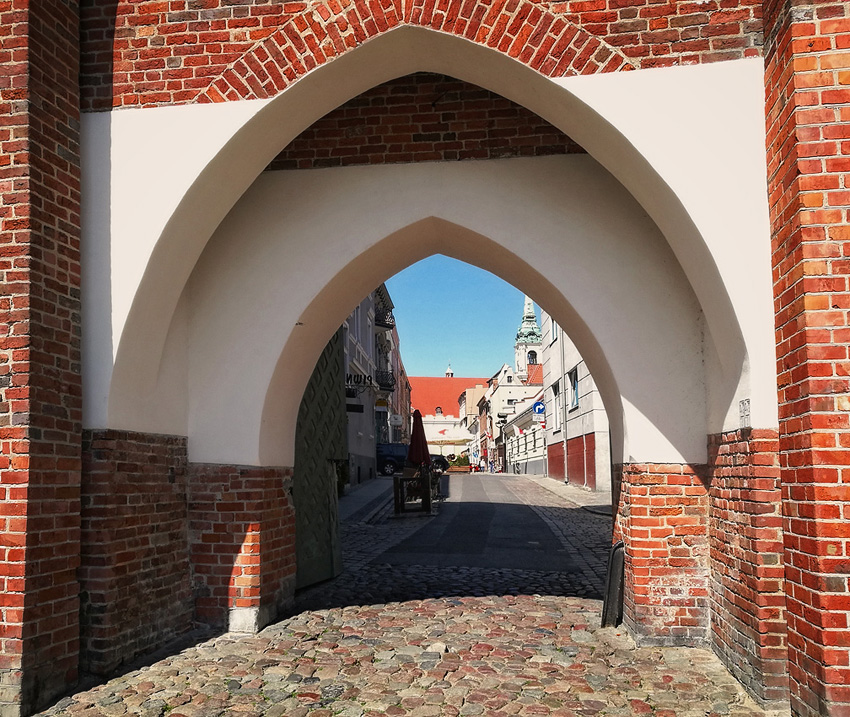
2018

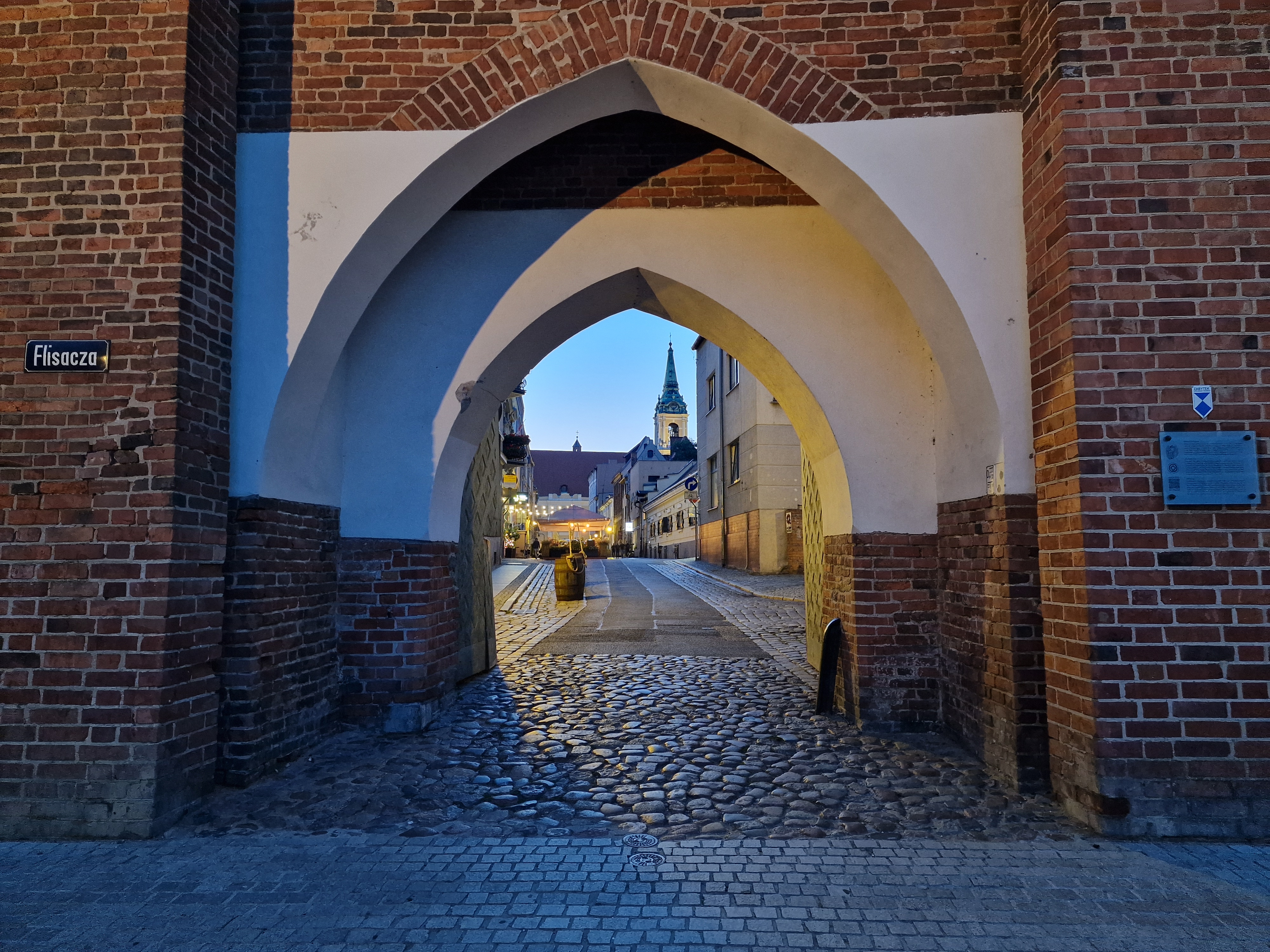
2025

== Sources ==
- Baszty i bramy. Brama Klasztorna (pol.). Toruń - a city website.
- Bramy. Brama Klasztorna (pol.). - Toruń city guide.
