= Buków, Podkarpackie Voivodeship =

Buków
- Village
- Location within Poland
- Coordinates: 49°38′35″N 21°57′39″E
- Country: Poland
- Voivodeship: Subcarpathian
- County: Brzozów
- Gmina: Haczów
- Population: 300

Buków [ˈbukuf] is a village in the administrative district of Gmina Haczów, within Brzozów County, Subcarpathian Voivodeship, in south-eastern Poland.

== History ==
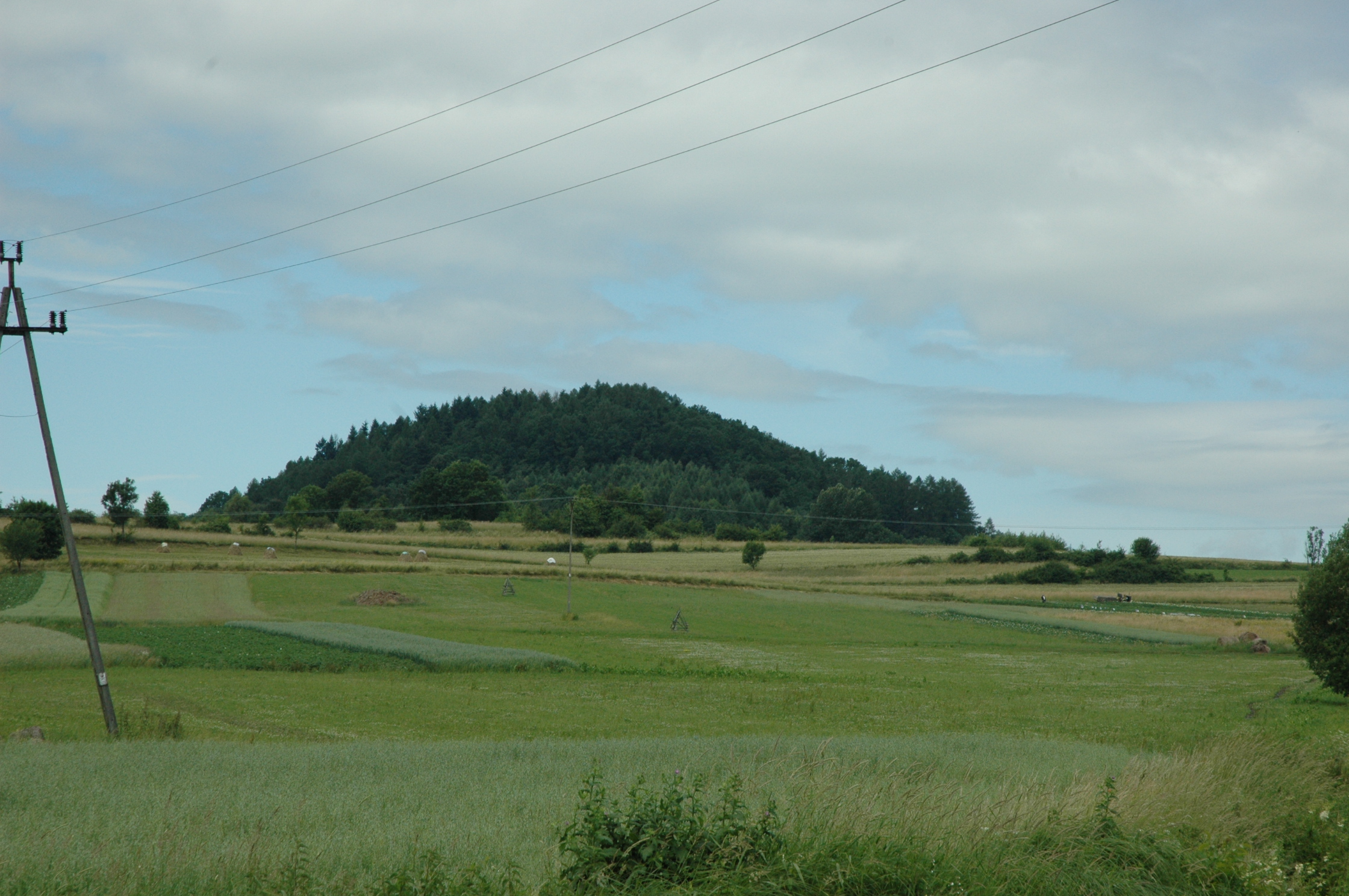
Hełm hill, view from Buków

The village is mentioned in documents as Bucowe (1430), de Bucowa/ de Bukowe (1437), Bukowa (1439), de Buccowo (1442), and Bukow (1464). The name of the village originates from the beech tree forest that once populated the area where the village is located. The village is first mentioned in legal documents in 1445 when the owner of the village, Jerzy Czeszykowicz, was trying to establish the border between the villages of Buków and Jasionów. In 1447 – 1448 the border between Buków and Wzdów was established on the Smynycza brook. In the following years, the borders between Trześniów were established.

The owner of Buków between the years of 1429 and 1480 was Jerzy Czeszykowicz. Adam Fastnacht mentions several disputes involving Jerzy Czeszykowich. In 1429, he ambushed Dobiesław Pilawe from Jasionów for which he was sued by Paweł and Szczepan from Jasionów, Maciej – sołtys from Lalin as well as Jan from Turze Pole and many others. In 1435 Czeszykowicz wounded Maciej (sołtys from Lalin) as well as getting into brawls and wounding Paweł Szafrot from Trześniów in 1436. He was also accused by the nobleman Jartka de Sboyno and Paweł for robbing and murdering in 1448 their brother, Jan Mazowszanin. Also in the same year, Czeszykowicz was sentenced for helping the local noblemen ambush the servant of the starosta and for releasing from him the known robber Jakub Kokoszkę as well as providing him shelter in his home.

Even for these many criminal actions, Czeszykowicz continued to increase his property fairly well. As the local historian and author, Jerzy F. Adamski writes, "In the year of 1447, Czeszykowicz acquired Srogów Górny followed by in 1450 and 1454 from Marcin and Henryk Kamieniecki a part of Jasienica Rosielna. Later on he was able to acquire the Wole Jasienicką (1460), Łodzinę (1458), Postołów, Wole Postołowską, and Huzele in 1460. From the lands around Przemyśl, he acquired from Mikołaj from Wapowic, Tarnowce". Czeszykowicz was able to acquire all of these lands through taking loans from Leonardo Pobiedna, Jerzy Matiaszowicz, Starosta Jan Kuropatwa, Mikołaj Pieniążek, and Henryk Kamieniecki.

In multiple documents, Jerzy Czeszykowicz is also mentioned/referenced as Jerzy Czeszyk and Jerzy Bukowski. He was married in 1443 to Katarzyna with whom he had five children: Mikołaj, Dziersław, Jan, Jerzy, and Katarzyna. His son, Jerzy, inherited his father's bad temper and reputation as was sentenced in 1493 for the rape of Małgorzate, the wife of Gregosz Teschar from Brzozów.

In the 19th century, the village was owned by Rafał Kołłątaj, who also owned Trześniów. After his death, his daughter, Maria, inherited the village which she had later submitted it in charity in 1853 to the institute of the deaf and blind in Lwów as well as the orphans of the Sacre-Coeur monastery.

During World War II, the villagers were active in the Polish Home Army unit located in neighboring Trześniów.

== Present day ==
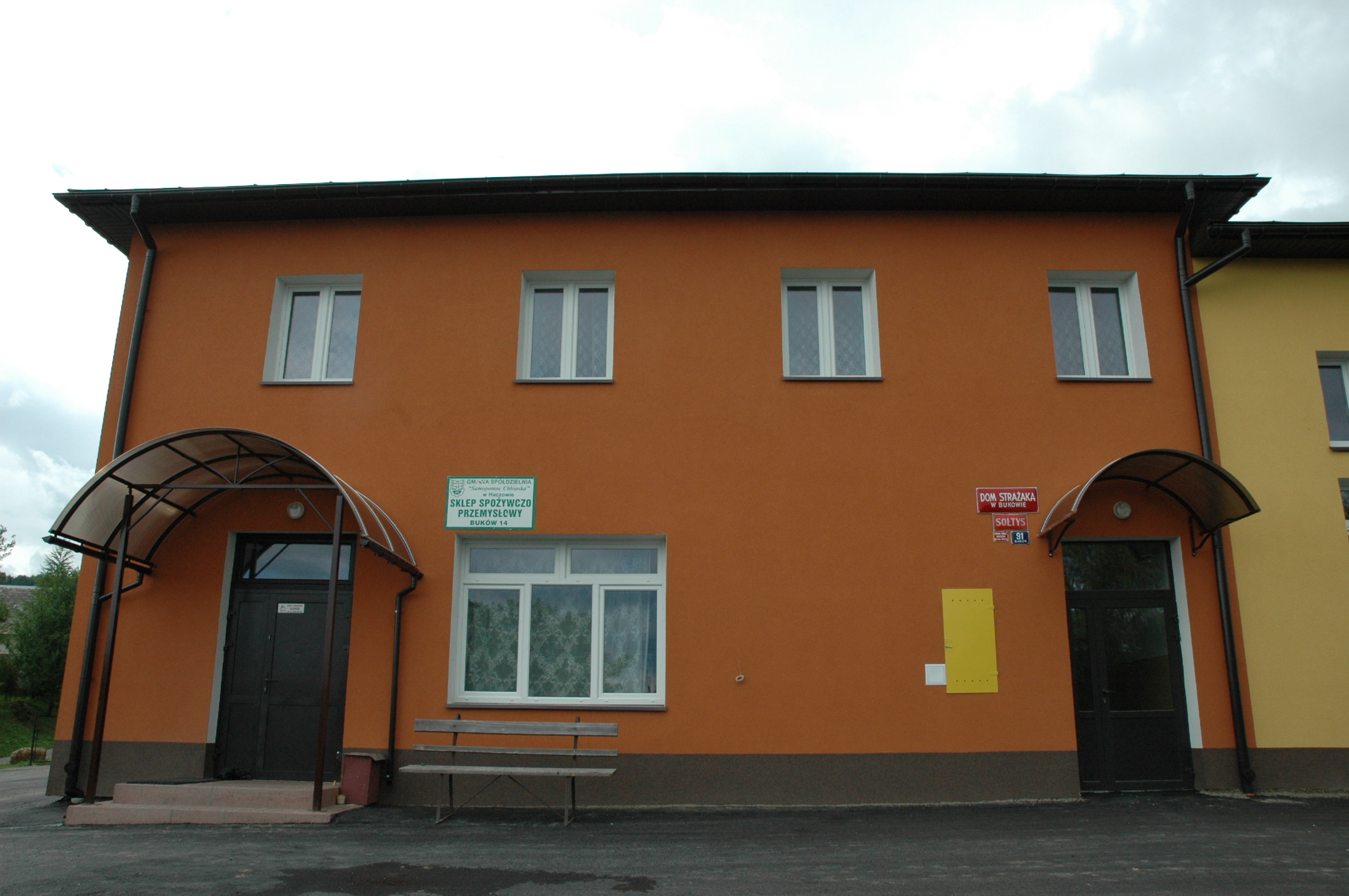
Buków Fire station

In the modern day, the villagers are members of the Trześniów parish of St. Stanislaw Bishop. Trześniów is also where the school children attend preschool, elementary school and gymnasium. Buków also has its own volunteer fire station.

== See also ==
- Brzozów
- Gmina Haczów
- Haczów
- Galicia (Central Europe)
- Trześniów
- Jasionów
