= Bezmiechowa =

Bezmiechowa may refer to the following places in Poland:

- Bezmiechowa Dolna
- Bezmiechowa Górna
