= Turze Pole =

- Village
- Location within Poland
- Coordinates: 49°39′44.69″N 22°0′4.72″E
- Country: Poland
- Voivodeship: Podkarpackie
- County: Brzozów
- Gmina: Brzozów
- Population: 1,040

Turze Pole ([ˈtuʐɛ ˈpɔlɛ]) is a village in the administrative district of Gmina Brzozów, within Brzozów County, Podkarpackie Voivodeship, in south-eastern Poland. The highest point in Turze Pole is the hill located just north of the village named Patria which is 383 meter above the water level.

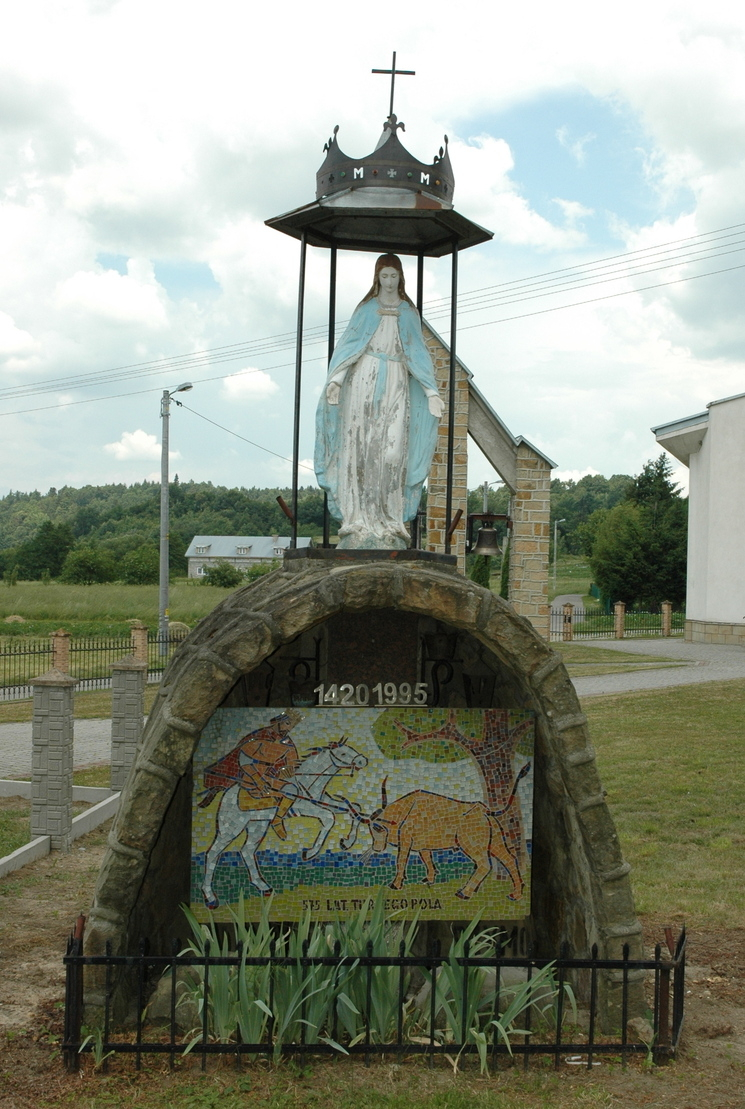
Monument of the 575 anniversary of the founding of Turze Pole

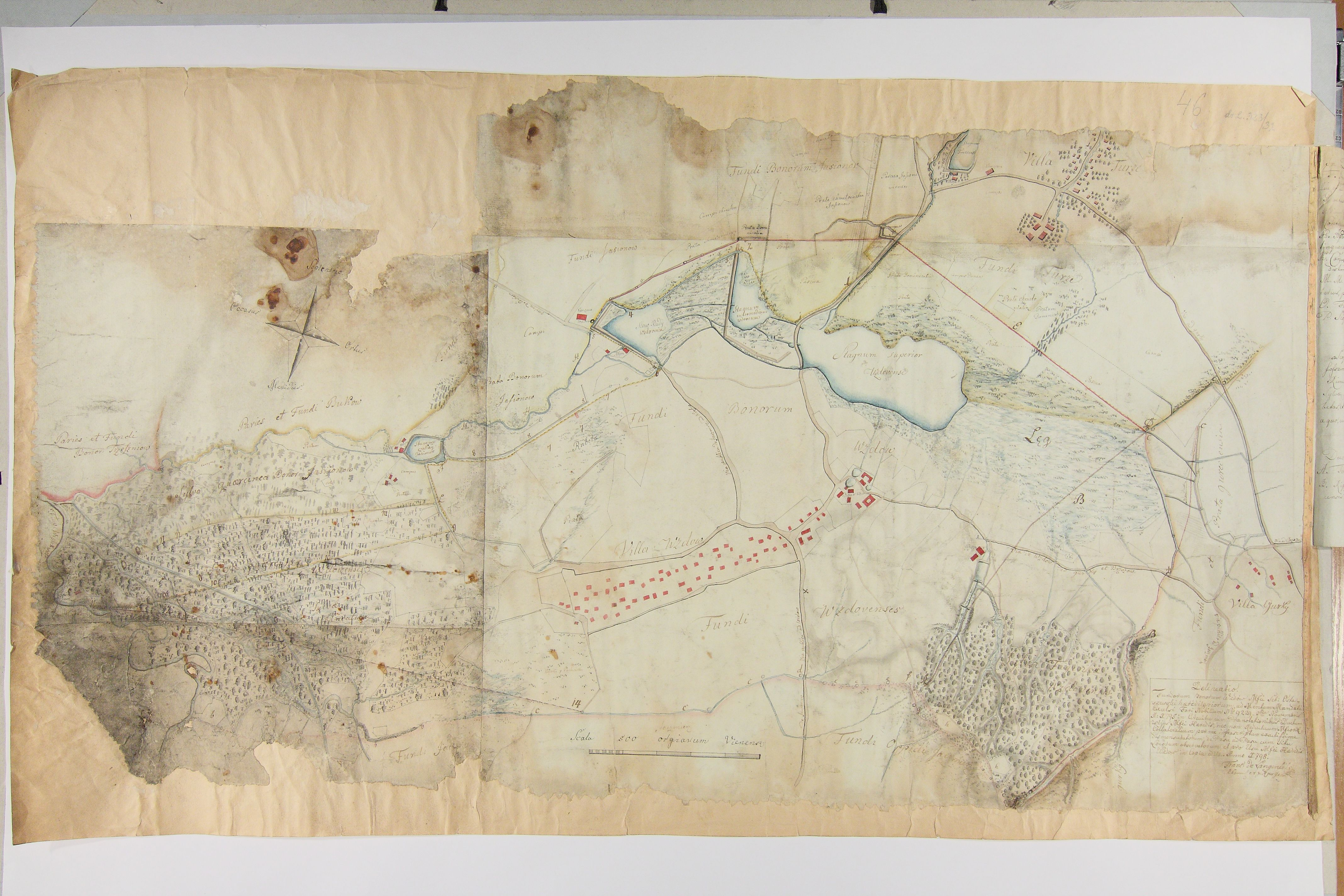
Map of Wzdow, Turze Pole, and the local area (1798)

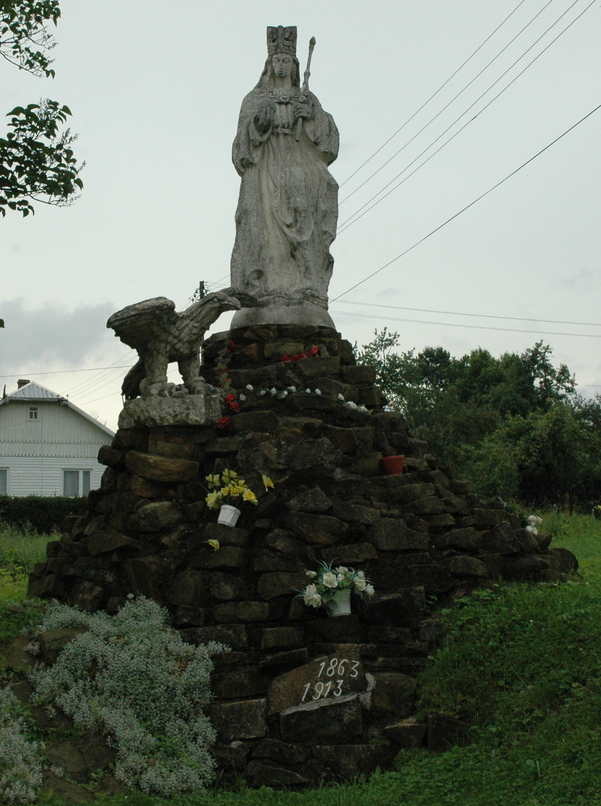
Monument in memory of the January Uprising and of Our Lady, Queen of Poland.

== History ==
The first known mention of the village is from 1420. The village was founded on Magdeburg Law and was initially owned by the Błoński family. The village center was the location of the Błoński brick manor house along with ten wooden buildings, an orchard, and a pond. Across from the manor house in 1791 a shrine was built which housed the statue of St.John of Nepomuk. In the first half of the 18th century the village belonged to Marie Łazowski, and then to Count Francis Starzenski (1769–1828).By the end of the 18th century, the village had grown to forty cottages. Shortly after his death, his children in sold the property in 1832 to John and Tekla from Świrskich Leszczynski . In 1891 the property was sold to Adam Ostaszewski from Wzdów, who was one of the pioneers of Polish aviation. By the end of the 19th century, there were two inns and a folwark that were operating in the village center. Turze Pole remained the property of The Ostaszewskis up until the end of World War II, due to the result of an agrarian reform by the Polish Committee of National Liberation, making it the property of the National Treasury.

=== Discovery of crude oil ===
During the 1890s, the village became well known for its oil extraction site that was located in the nearby forest. The first hydrocarbon exploration in the area started in 1885, which resulted with positive results. The year of 1890 marked the beginning of oil extraction operations . The peak production in this area was in 1910 and by 1914 there was a total of 14 completed oil wells. From 1914 to 1939, the total number of oil wells was increased to 35. During the Second World War, as a result of the increase of demand for crude oil, 29 new wells were added to the existing 35. The years of 1948-1950 marked the last years of the high rate of production for the area. The drilling site is still in operation today.

=== Volunteer fire brigade ===
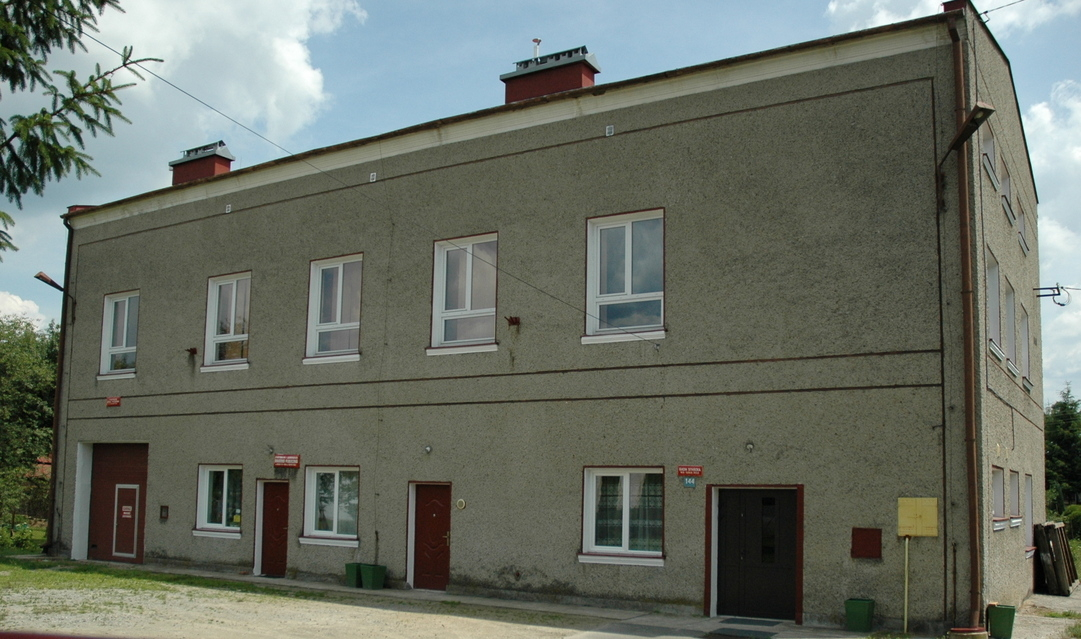
Volunteer Fire Station and Library in Turze Pole

The Turze Pole volunteer fire brigade was established in 1907. Its founders were Jan Czechowski, Jan Władyka and the local school teacher Antoni Zgrych. For the newly created organization, a building measuring 5m x 4m was built and it housed the first equipment of the OSP: a horse-drawn fire pump as well as a number of smaller hoses and hand pumps. May 28, 1978 the original "Fireman's House" was given to the use of the village. In 2007, the OSP celebrated its 100 anniversary of its founding.

=== World War II ===
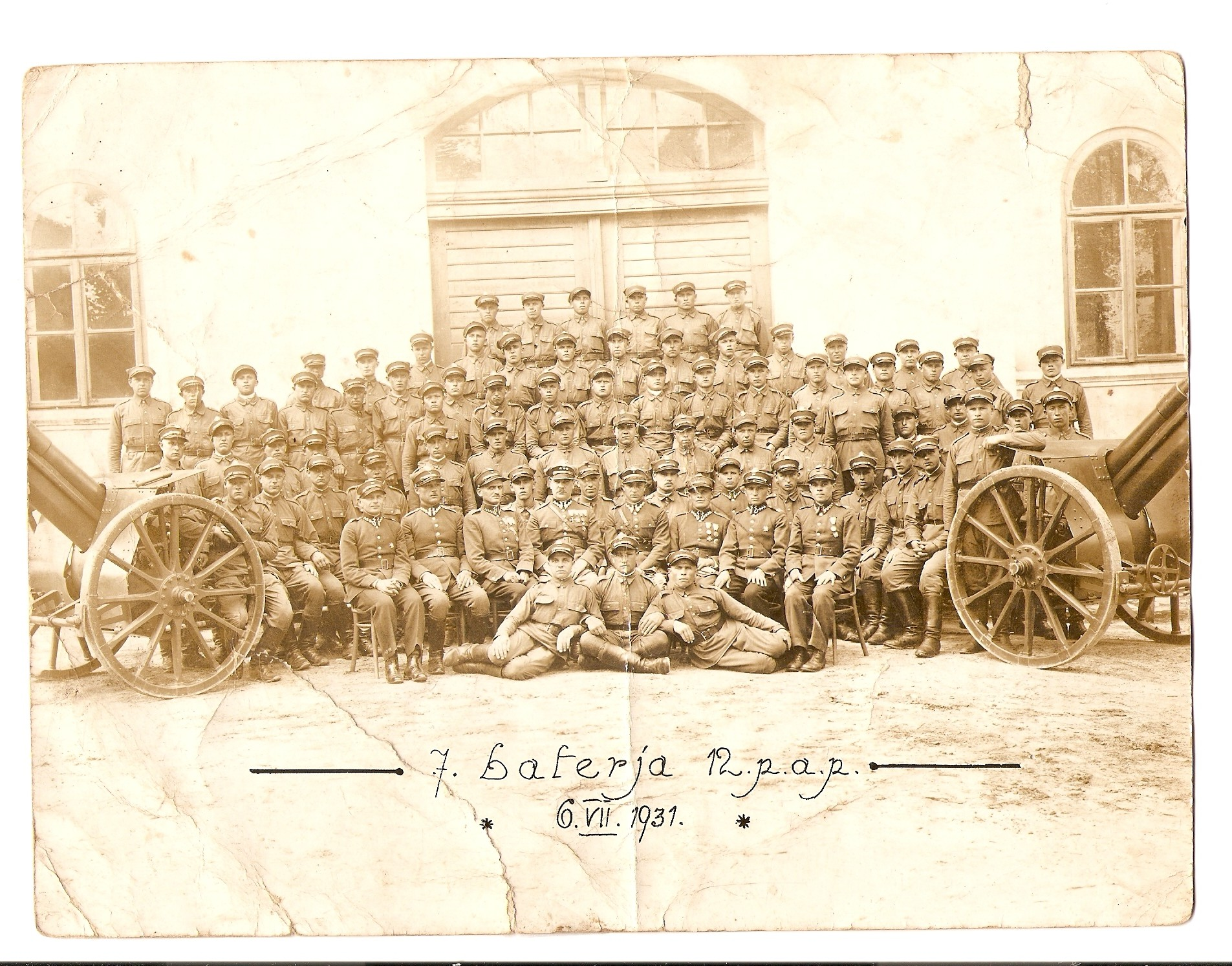
Franciszek Konopka, front row, center

During the Second World War, the village was the base of a polish Home Army partisan group under the command of lieutenant Wojciech Rosolski, "Skalny". The group committed multiple acts of sabotage on the oil wells located nearby which were well planned out in order to avoid any German reprisals against the workers. The group had members who came from Turze Pole as well as the neighboring villages of Jasionów, Humniska, Zmiennica, and Buków. One of the unit's hideouts as well as communication points was the house of Franciszek Konopka. Konopka was a soldier during the September campaign in the 12 Kresowy Light Artillery Regiment, however he was captured by the Soviets from which he escaped and returned from the soviet occupied area of Poland back to Turze Pole by December 1939. The house was used by the partisans when they needed to hide for a couple of days as well as the drop-off and pick-up place for the underground mail and communication network. The family of the commander of the partisan group was also involved in the underground conspiracy. The brother of the commander, Tadeusz Rosolski, was taken by the Gestapo and was executed in Jasło. The group operated in the region between the cities of Krosno and Sanok. The main objective of the group was to limit the extraction of crude oil in the area. The group also undertook a number of armed actions against the Germans such as the failed attempt on the life of the local German Gendarmerie "Jocha", who was the commandant of the German police station in Haczów. The attempt took place in the village of Jasionów and Rosolski was the first to open fire but he had shot wide and missed the gendarmerie. Another armed attack was directed on two armored cars by three partisans, which resulted as a failure but without partisan casualties. Other active members of the resistance were local school teacher Karol Toczyński, who was active in the propaganda section of the resistance from 1942. In 1944, Rosolski was replaced by his adjutant, lieutenant Adam Hędrzak. Once the Soviets arrived, the group again faced arrests and interrogations, this time from the hands of the UB. During the occupation, the old quarries located around Patria served as a place of refuge for Jews and others who were persecuted by the Nazi regime. The local forests around Turze Pole served as hideouts for the local Home Army partisan as well as for the anti-communist group under Major Żubryd who operated in this region after the war.

=== Recent history ===
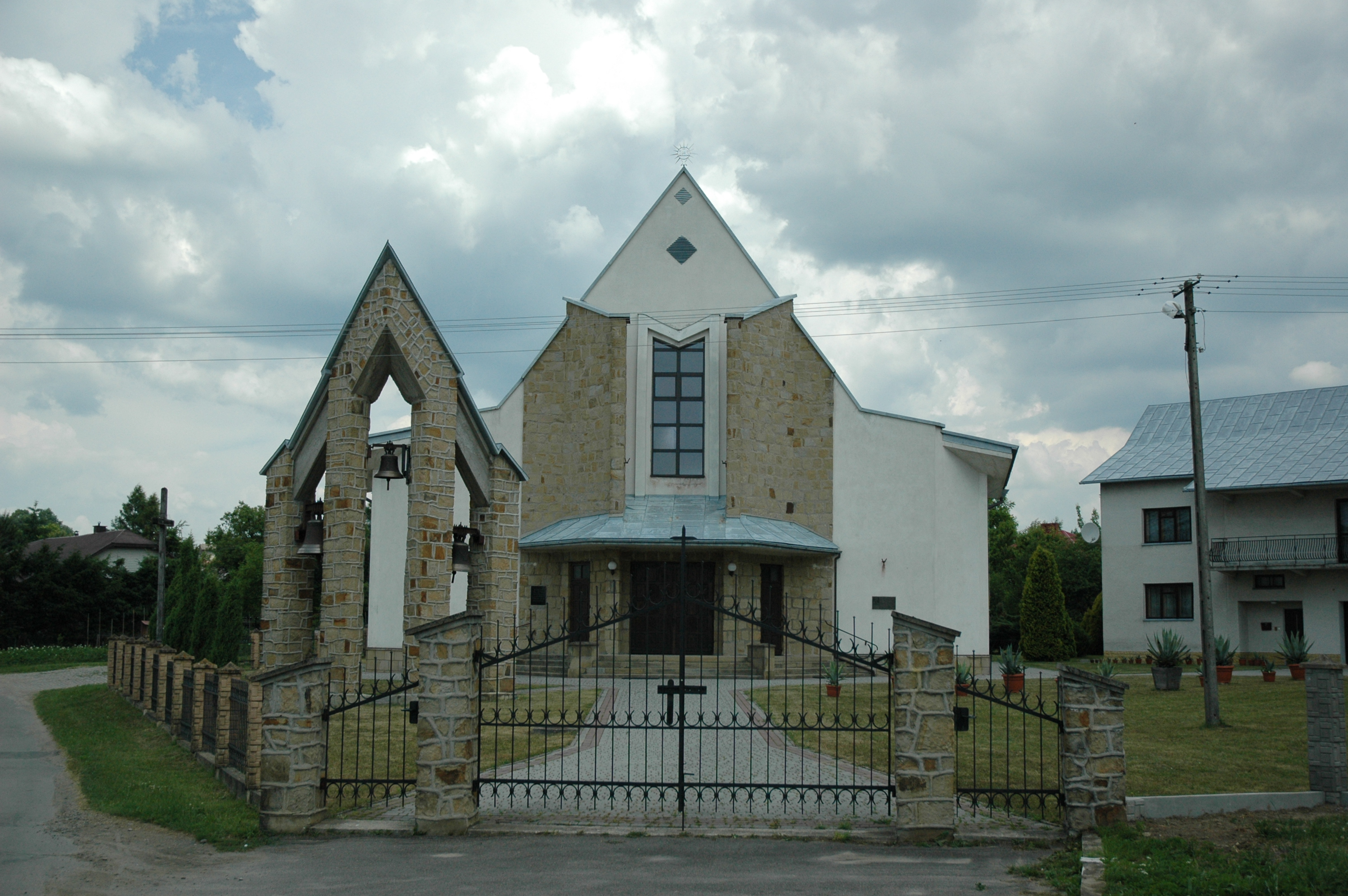
Church of Divine Mercy - Turze Pole

In of 1989–1991, the parish church, Church of the Invocation of Divine Mercy, was built under the direction of architects Zdzisław Wojdanowski and Lucjan Krynicki from Brzozów. In of 1995-1996 under the initiative of the village pastor, Fr.Henryk Hazik, a monograph of the village was created.

== Important figures from Turze Pole ==
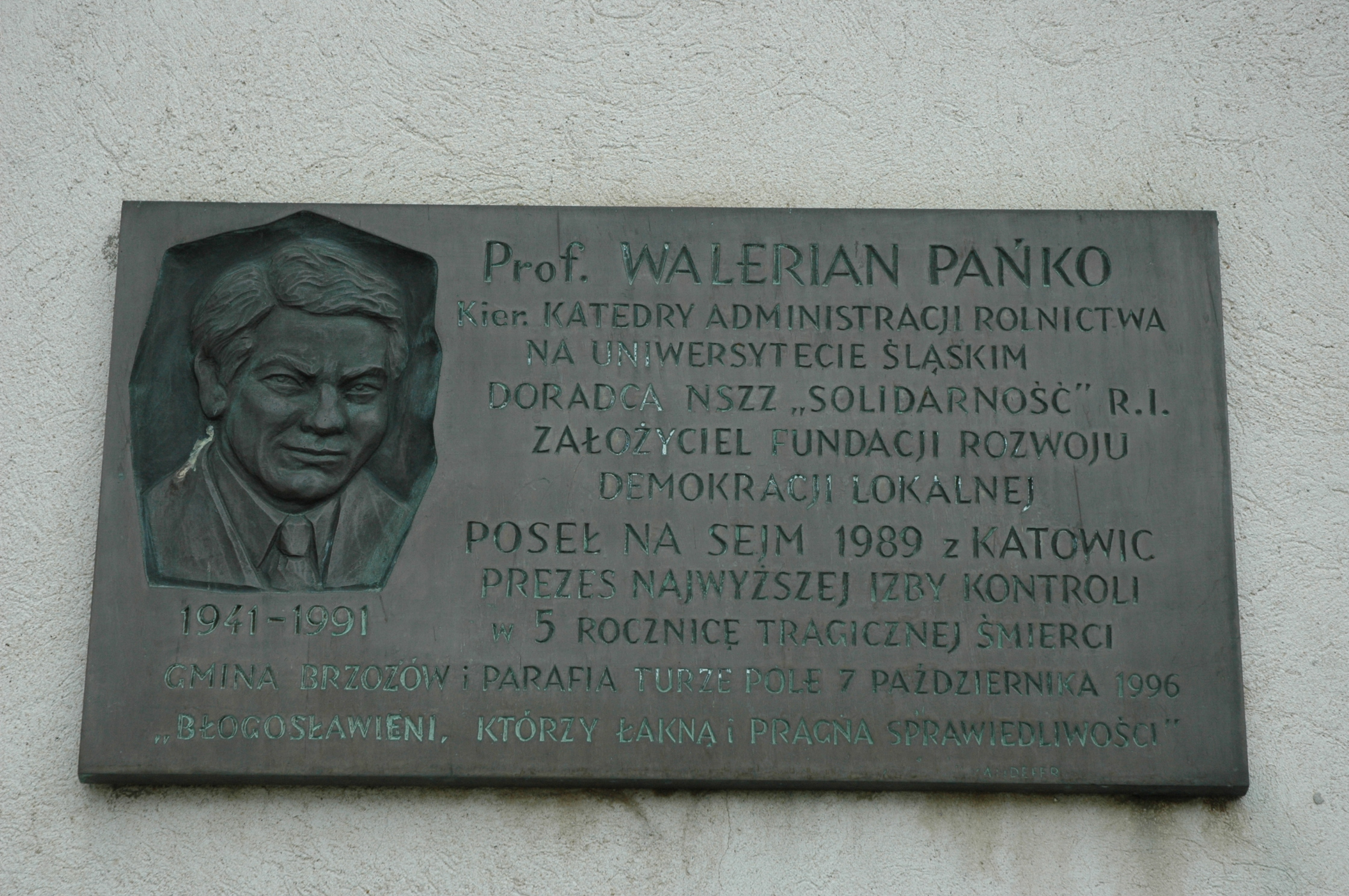
Commemorative plaque of Walerian Pańko - Turze Pole

In 1941, professor. Dr. Valerian Pańko was born in Turze Pole. He was a lawyer, president of Supreme Chamber of Control of the Republic of Poland who died in a mysterious car accident on October 7, 1991, during the investigation of the controversial FOZZ affair, which he was heading at the time. Since 1980, he was involved in the activities of the trade union Solidarity. He was an advisor during strikes in Rzeszow as well as in Ustrzyki Dolne. He is buried next to his father in the neighboring village of Jasionów.

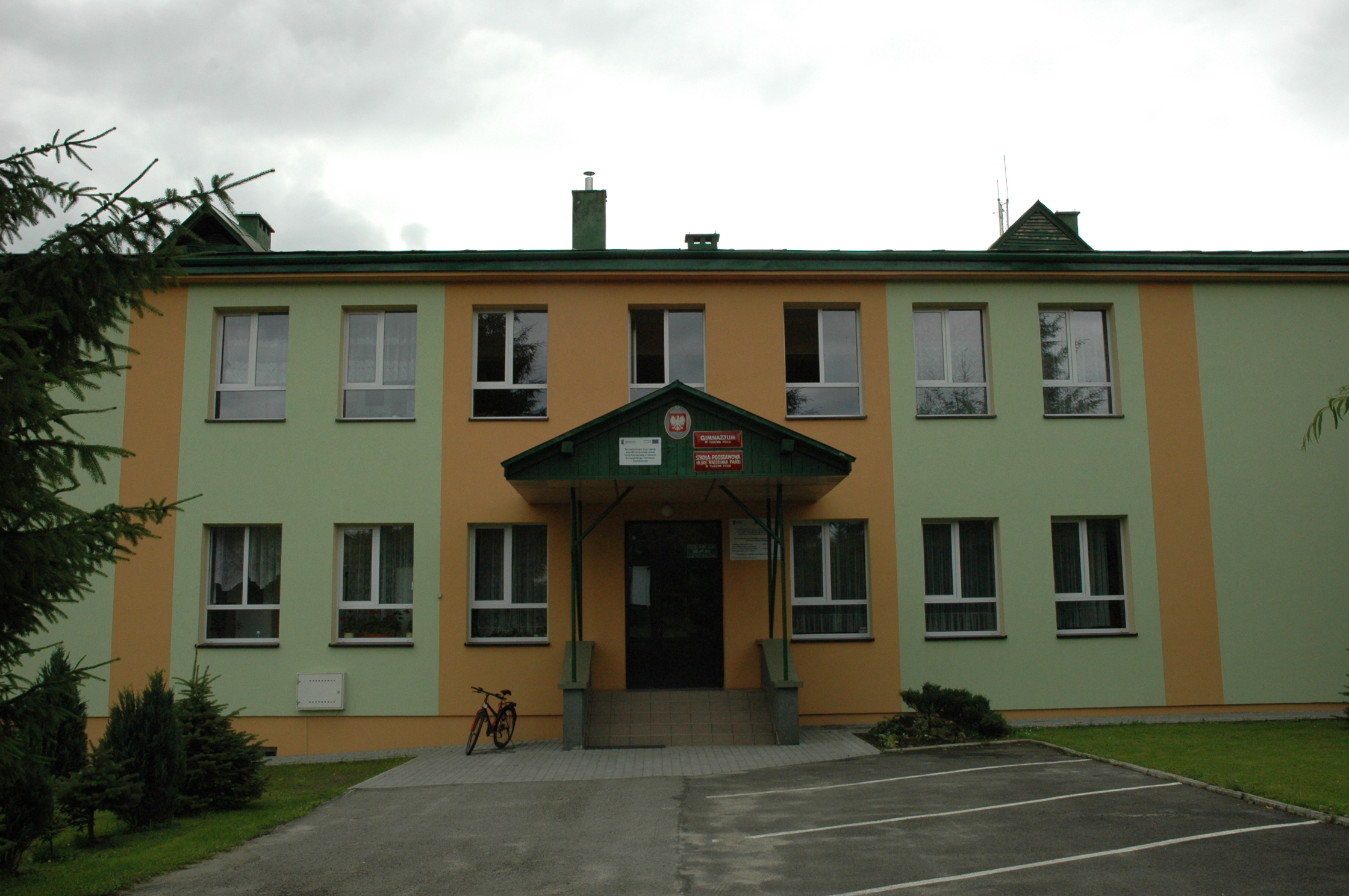
School in Turze Pole that is named in honor of Walerian Pańko

== See also ==
- Brzozów
- Gmina Brzozów
- Haczów
- Ignacy Łukasiewicz
- Galicia (Central Europe)
