= Jankowce =

- Village
- Location within Poland
- Coordinates: 49°29′6″N 22°21′4″E
- Country: Poland
- Voivodeship: Subcarpathian
- County: Lesko
- Gmina: Lesko

Jankowce [jaŋˈkɔft͡sɛ] is a village in the administrative district of Gmina Lesko, within Lesko County, Subcarpathian Voivodeship, in south-eastern Poland.

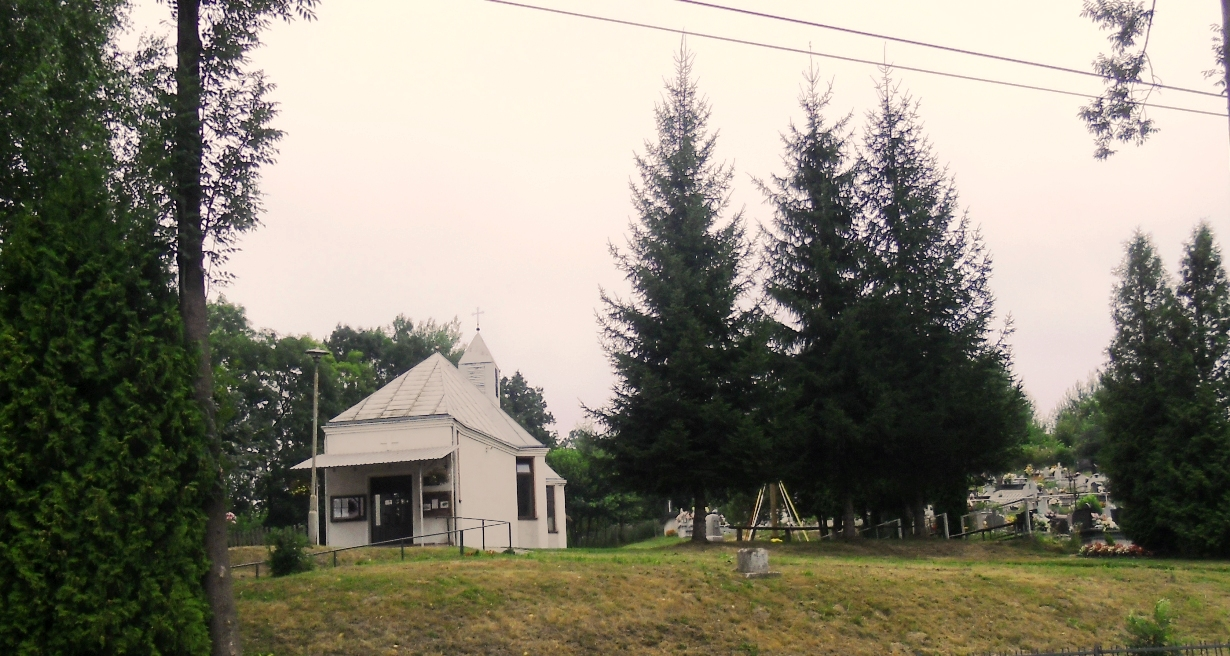
Catholic church of St. Jadwigi Krolowei in Jankowce (Poland).

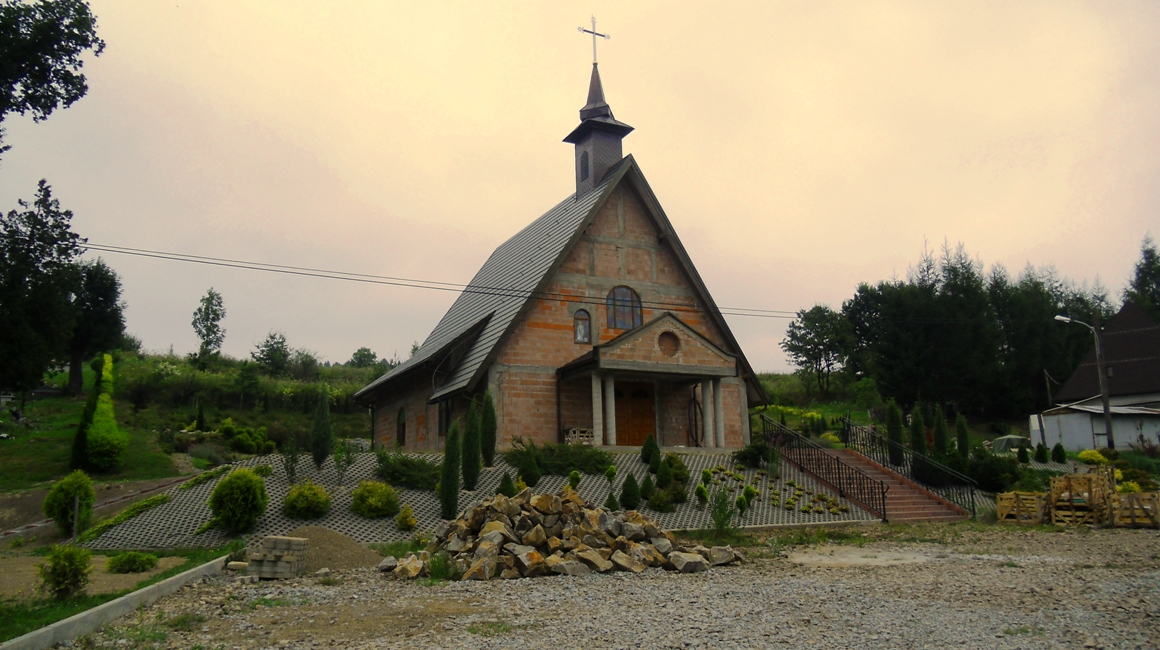
New construction of the church in Jankowce.
