= Jabłonica Polska =

- Village
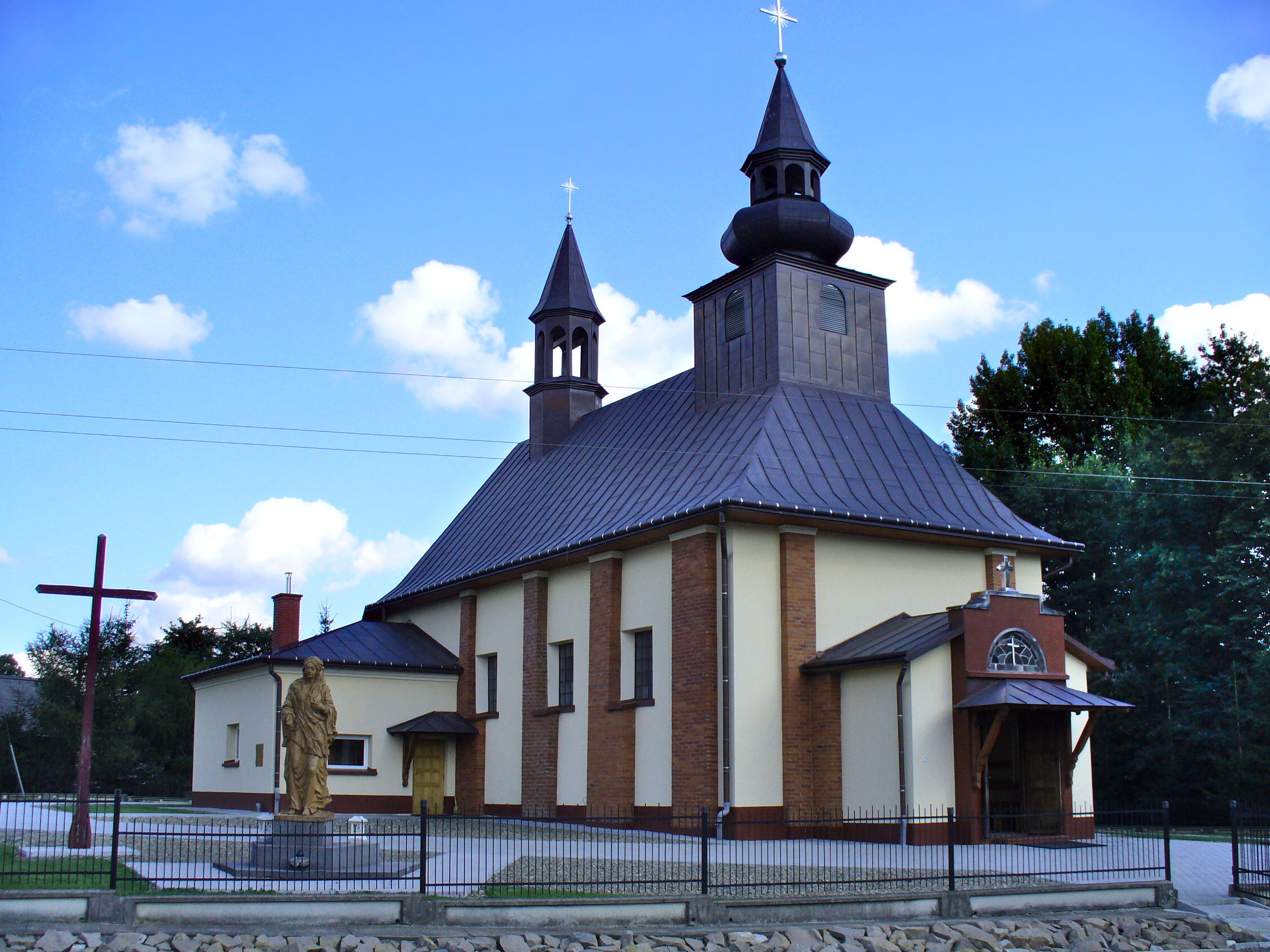
- Catholic church

- Location within Poland
- Coordinates: 49°42′N 21°54′E
- Country: Poland
- Voivodeship: Subcarpathian
- County: Brzozów
- Gmina: Haczów
- Elevation: 295 m (968 ft)
- Population: 1,076

Jabłonica Polska [jabwɔˈɲit͡sa ˈpɔlska] is a village in the administrative district of Gmina Haczów, within Brzozów County, Subcarpathian Voivodeship, in south-eastern Poland.
