= Łukawica, Lesko County =

Łukawica
- Village
- Location within Poland
- Coordinates: 49°30′N 22°20′E
- Country: Poland
- Voivodeship: Subcarpathian
- County: Lesko
- Gmina: Lesko

Łukawica [wukaˈvʲit͡sa] is a village in the administrative district of Gmina Lesko, within Lesko County, Subcarpathian Voivodeship, in south-eastern Poland.
