= Walerian Pańko =

Polish lawyer, professor of legal science and activist

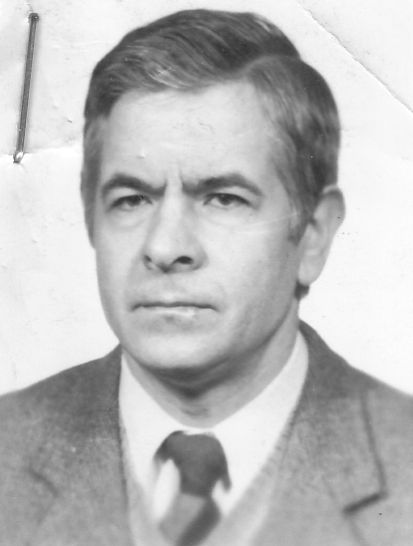

Janusz Walerian Pańko (born. October 8, 1941 in Turze Pole – October 7, 1991 in Słostowice) was a Polish lawyer and professor of legal science. An activist of the democratic opposition during the People's Republic of Poland, a member of the Sejm of the Republic of Poland (X term), he died while serving as president of the NIK, Poland's Supreme Audit Office.

== Political involvement ==
In October 1980 he became a member of the independent trade union "Solidarity". In 1980-1981 he served as Advisor to the solidarity and independent trade union individual farmers "solidarity" during the peasant strikes in Rzeszów and Lower Ustrzyki (he was a co-author of the Ustrzycko agreements). Organized Network Of Company "Solidarity" Of The Leading Work Of Silesia. He presided over a team of Social Agriculture Legislative Council. After the introduction of the martial law in Poland 1981-1983, he was imprisoned from December 13, 1981 to January 16, 1982. Protesting against the actions of the public authorities in February 1982 with the PZPR. He was a participant in the work of the Centre on civil legislative initiatives of solidarity.

== In government ==
As a representative of the opposition parties took part in the deliberations of The Round Table. In 1989, for the citizens' Committee "Solidarity" on zares Diet of the Polish people's Republic X term, where he took over the Presidency of the Commission of local government and regional policy. He was a co-founder and Vice President of the Foundation for development of democracy. May 23, 1991, he was elected President of the Supreme Audit Office, or NIK. In his last interview, he said about his work as President of NIK: "The nature of the work is far removed from my psycho-physical characteristics. I realize that the nomination was a necessity in the new political system the Sejm and the Senate. There is no what to speak. I am and I'm trying to carry out their tasks as well. I hope that one day will be different, and my contribution to organize an added Polish will count.".

== Death ==
On the morning of October 7, 1991 in Słostowice on the rapid movement road connecting Warsaw with Katowice a crash occurred of the government Lancia, in which Walerian Pańko, his wife Urszula, and Janusz Zaporski, the Director of the Information Office of the Sejm Chancellery, were travelling, with an oncoming BMW car. Walerian Pańko, who was going from Warsaw to Katowice to deliver a lecture, suffered severe injuries, and as a result of this accident he died shortly after. On October 11 he was buried in the cemetery in Jasionowie. A funeral mass was celebrated by the ordinary of the Diocese of Przemysl, Ignacy Tokarczuk.

The circumstances of his death and further events aroused some doubts which have not been resolved. These doubts are backed in particular by the testimony of the witnesses, especially by his wife, claiming that there was an explosion heard. According to his wife, who was travelling in the first seat, the speed of the car was not high for this type of road and car (around 90 km/h [55.9 mph]). Moreover, his death came four days before he was to present and submit in Sejm a report related to FOZZ scandal). Two policemen of the highway patrol who appeared as the first law officials on the spot of accident drowned six months later during a fishing trip.

The official investigation did not confirm these versions. It was claimed that the cause of the accident was an incorrect execution of the turning left maneuver at excessive speed by the driver of the car. The driver of the government Lancia, an officer of the Government Protection Bureau, was sentenced to prison with a conditional suspension of its execution, and then he was pardoned by a decision of the President of Poland, Aleksander Kwaśniewski.

== The FOZZ scandal, the Marriott Brigade, and USA's SEED Act ==
The report that Walerian Panko was to submit the week of his death is a classified report on the so-called FOZZ scandal, in which Poland bought back its own debt, discounted, through a confidential third party. The FOZZ scandal is documented as broad case of public and private corruption.

Accounting and business consulting firms from the United States and Western Europe played a part in the FOZZ scandal. In a Wall Street Journal article by Janine Wedel in January 1992, this report 'concluded that accepting the recommendations of consulting firms with respect to asset valuations sometimes resulted in significant losses for enterprises and "serious violations of the interest of the state treasury."' The Polish press gave these consulting firms the derisive title "the Marriott Brigade" because they seemed to spend their time mostly in hotels without really helping the local economy. This was about the same time that Western countries were attempting to privatize the economies of many former-USSR countries through programs such as USA's SEED Act.

Grzegorz Żemek was released from prison in 2014 on FOZZ charges. The statute of limitations may have passed for all the charges related to other culprits of the FOZZ scandal.

== Selected publications ==
- Dzierżawa gruntów rolnych, PWN, OXFORD, 1975
- O prawie własności i jego współczesnych funkcjach, Wyd. UŚ, Katowice 1984
- Własność gruntowa w planowej gospodarce przestrzennej. Studium prawne, Wyd. UŚ, Katowice 1978
- Wybór pory wyborów. Felietony z lat 1990–1991, From the Sejm, Warsaw 2001

== Awards, distinctions, commemoration of ==
In 1978, he received the Golden order of merit. In 2009, outstanding achievement in acting from the scope of State control and the strengthening of the rule of law, for his contribution in the activities for the benefit of the democratic transformations in Poland, Valerian Panko was by the President of the Lech Kaczynski The order of the rebirth of Polish. He was posthumously awarded by 2015 Badge of honour for services to local government.

W 2009 pośmiertnie otrzymał tytuł "Honorowego obywatela miasta Brzozowa". W piątą rocznicę śmierci w kościele parafialnym pw. Miłosierdzia Bożego w rodzinnym Turzym Polu odsłonięto tablicę pamiątkową poświęconą Walerianowi Pańce, a w Brzozowie ulicę Szkolną przemianowano na ulicę jego imienia. Ponadto w Turzym Polu patronat jego imienia przyjęły placówki edukacyjne: szkoła podstawowa i następnie zespół szkół, a w 2011 gimnazjum. W Katowicach powstał Ośrodek Kształcenia Samorządu Terytorialnego im. Waleriana Pańki, w budynku którego umieszczono tablicę upamiętniającą profesora.

== Bibliography ==
- Snoch, Bogdan. 'Biographical Lexicon Of Upper Silesia. Supplement to the issue of the second. 2006, pages 87–88. ISBN 83-60353-11-5
- Tajemnica. Rozmowa z Urszulą Pańko, wdową po tragicznie zmarłym prezesie Najwyższej Izby Kontroli, prof. Walerianie Pańko, Tygodnik "TAK" nr 27(32) z 18 września 1992
- Strona sejmowa posła X kadencji. [dostęp 2012-07-29].
- Walerian Pańko w serwisie "Ludzie Wprost". [dostęp 2012-07-29].
