= Janine R. Wedel =

American anthropologist and scholar on international policy

- Education: Bethel College; Indiana University Bloomington; University of California, Berkeley (PhD)
- Occupation: Anthropologist
- Employer: George Mason University Schar School of Policy and Government
- Awards: Grawemeyer Award

Janine R. Wedel is an American anthropologist and university professor in the Schar School of Policy and Government at George Mason University and a senior research fellow of the New America Foundation. She is the author of several books and many articles on some key systemic processes of the day. She is the first anthropologist to win the Grawemeyer Award for Ideas Improving World Order.

== Biography ==
Wedel received a Bachelor of Arts in history, social sciences, and German from Bethel College in 1978, a Master of Arts in anthropology and East European studies from Indiana University Bloomington in 1980, and a Ph.D. in cultural anthropology from the University of California, Berkeley, in 1985. She writes about governing, corruption, foreign aid, and influence elites through the lens of a social anthropologist. She is a university professor in the Schar School of Policy and Government at George Mason University and senior research fellow at the New America Foundation.

Wedel is co-founder and president of the Association for the Anthropology of Policy formerly known as the Interest Group for the Anthropology of Public Policy.

== Areas of research ==
- International Commerce and Policy
- Anthropology of Public Policy
- Corruption
- Eastern Europe
- Foreign Aid
- Governance
- Privatization of Government
- Social Networks

== Bibliography ==
=== Books ===
Wedel's most recent books are

- Dumas, L.J., J.R. Wedel and G. Callman. Confronting Corruption, Building Accountability: Lessons from the World of International Development Advising. Palgrave, 2010.
- Wedel, J. R. Shadow Elite: How the World's New Power Brokers Undermine Democracy, Government, and the Free Market. Basic Books, 2009.
- Wedel, J. R. Prywatna Polska (the Private Poland) with new introduction: The Private Poland, A Quarter Century Later. Warsaw, Poland: Wydawnictwo Trio, 2007.
- Wedel, J. R. Collision and Collusion: The Strange Case of Western Aid to Eastern Europe. Palgrave, 2001.
- The Unplanned Society (edited, annotated, and introductions, Columbia University Press, 1992)
- The Private Poland: An Anthropologist Looks at Everyday Life (1986)

==== Shadow Elite ====
In her book, Shadow Elite: How the World's New Power Brokers Undermine Democracy, Government, and the Free Market, Wedel explores the non-transparent ways in which, in her view, many of today's top power brokers operate. She explores what she suggests are the rules of the game these contemporary power elites are writing to benefit themselves and their social networks, and what she sees as the negative implications for democracy, the rule of law and the free market. Her work assesses what she claims is the significant extent to which the new rules take us beyond traditional corruption and conflict-of-interest — and into an accountability-challenged era.

Labeling the new breed of U.S. and international political operators "flexians," Wedel characterizes these players as moving seamlessly among roles in government, business, think tanks, and media, advancing their own personal agendas and those of their associates at the expense of democracy and accountability. Examples include retired four-star army general Barry R. McCaffrey and financial advisor Larry Summers, among many others, both foreign and domestic.

By a flexian wearing several hats simultaneously (think tanker, retired military or government official, corporate representative, so-called "objective" expert), as did Barry R. McCaffrey in the run-up to the Iraq war, Wedel claims to show how a flexian can gain extraordinary insider knowledge and influence in order to custom-tailor a version of the "truth" benefitting the highest monetary bidder. In this way, flexians not only "co-opt public policy agendas" but "craft policy with their benefactors' purposes (monetary profit) in mind."

Some flexians work together in what Wedel calls "flex nets", close-knit networks that guard and share information. Like flexians, flex nets arose to fill a new niche. Wedel writes that, just as flexians cannot be reduced to mere lobbyists, neither can flex nets be reduced to interest groups, lobbies, old-boy networks, mafias, and other such groupings in society, government, and business. Like interest groups and lobbies, flex nets serve a long-established function in the modern state, mediating between official and private. And, like the mafia networks, flex nets have their tentacles in both state and private organizations. But, unlike mafia, many of their activities are not secret, but open, as members of flex nets make their case all over the airwaves. Thus while flex nets incorporate important aspects of other such groupings, they also differ from them in crucial ways—and those ways are precisely what make flex nets less visible and less accountable. Examples include the dozen or so players around neo-conservative cold-warrior Richard Perle, some of whom have long been working together in various incarnations for as long as 30 years to change American foreign policy according to their own ideology.

Flexians and flex nets are the consequence of an unprecedented confluence of four transformational 20th and 21st century developments: government privatization, outsourcing and deregulation; the end of the Cold War; the growth of new information technologies; and "the embrace of 'truthiness.'"

The book seems to be a work of investigative anthropology.

In Wedel's view, today's American and, more generally, Western socio-economic and "democratic" political systems look increasingly similar to many communist and post-communist societies in the ways that they merge state and private power. In a 2009 Salon article she wrote: "The way that government and business now interlock in the U.S., notably in the wake of Wall Street's meltdown, is beginning to resemble the tangle of self-interested government-business "clans" and other such informal networks that emerged during the East's transition to a market economy in the 1990s. I have come to this conclusion after spending the better part of three decades studying communist and post-communist societies — observing first how people circumvented the communist system, and when it was coming undone, how players positioned themselves to wield power and influence and thereby helped create the emerging order. This century, as I've turned much of my energy homeward, my prior experience has — to my surprise — proved ideal preparation for looking into similar issues in the United States."

===== Reviews =====
The book was generally well received. Publishers Weekly gave Shadow Elite a starred review. The Huffington Post selected it as a monthly Book Club selection and described it as a "gripping, disquieting book" that exposes and explains why it's been so hard to bring about any real change in our country---why Washington "no longer seems capable of addressing the problems our nation faces". The Financial Times described the book as "a serious study of global affairs ... and the top-level politicians, bureaucrats and businessmen who make up the global elite. Janine Wedel's argument is that political culture at the beginning of the 21st century has changed in such a way" as to make it easier, and even obligatory, for individuals to mask their true agendas and conflicts of interest in creating policies. Public Administration Review described Shadow Elite as making "an important contribution to the effort to conceptualize the increasingly problematic role of elites in American government and politics." This review determined that the book finds a "startling, if not alarming", congruence between off-the-books governing practices in Eastern Europe upon the fall of the Soviet Union and government policy "entrepreneurship" in the United States. Contemporary Sociology called Shadow Elite "an example of the cutting edge of the discipline [of anthropology]." Choice wrote that "Wedel (George Mason University) presents an arresting theory of power that deserves wide attention....as a thinker she is in the same league as John Kenneth Galbraith and Charles Lindblom."

==== Collision and Collusion ====
Collision and Collusion: The Strange Case of Western Aid to Eastern Europe was generally well received, despite being controversial. In granting the book and Wedel's work on the subject the 2001 Grawemeyer Award for Ideas Improving World Order, the selection committee noted: "This is a book that is bound to have a long-term impact on the practice and politics of foreign aid from the West to non-western economies." Zbigniew Brzezinski, former national security advisor, wrote about Collision and Collusion: "Very critical and troubling analysis of the shortcomings of Western aid policy, particularly to Russia. The implications of Wedel's critical assessment need to be seriously taken into account." The book was named "impressive and informative" by Foreign Affairs while American Ethnologist called it "a tribute to the high caliber of Wedel's journalistic and anthropological abilities alike and a reminder of the need for a re-envisioned and effective anthropology brought to bear on pressing social issues." The Wall Street Journal wrote that "Janine Wedel's admirable new book... argues convincingly that the lack of accountability on both sides ultimately compromised all those involved....Aid, it seems, can hurt as well as help." Other academics have recently given the name FOZZ affair collectively to scandal of Polish corruption at the time.

Wedel's research about western aid in former-Soviet states may in the future help to shed light on the untimely death in 1991 of the president of the Polish Supreme Audit Office, Walerian Panko.

==== The Private Poland ====
Wedel's first book was The Private Poland: An Anthropologist's Look at Everyday Life (1986) which Osteuropa Wirtschaft called "a brilliant account of contemporary Polish society". Ernest Gellner, the noted University of Cambridge social anthropologist, wrote that "Her book...makes an extremely valuable contribution." The Los Angeles Times reviewer wrote: "In spite of its engrossing readability this is a serious piece of research by a Berkeley-trained anthropologist."

=== Monographs ===
- Building Accountability into International Development Advising in an Age of Diffused Governance. Resource Handbook, Submitted to Ford Foundation, 2007.
- Corruption and Organized Crime in Post-Communist States: New Ways of Manifesting Old Patterns. In Trends in Organized Crime, volume 7, number 1, Fall 2001, pages 3–61 (released Fall 2003).
- Local Government Reform, NGOs, and Training in Russia: A Tale of Three Cities (with Jonathan Harris and Yulia Bolotskikh). Washington, D.C.: Submitted to Eurasia Foundation, 2002.
- Toward an Anti-Corruption Agenda. Report commissioned by the Social Development Team, World Bank, Washington, D.C., 1999.
- Western Aid to Central and Eastern Europe: What We are Doing Right, What We are Doing Wrong, and How We Can Do It Better (with John Harper). East European Studies Occasional Paper: The Woodrow Wilson International Center for Scholars, number 41, September 1995.
- The Effects of Regulation on the Home Improvement Industry. Manual commissioned and distributed by the Federal Trade Commission, Washington, D.C., 1982.
