= Glinne =

- Village
- Location within Poland
- Coordinates: 49°28′49″N 22°22′7″E
- Country: Poland
- Voivodeship: Subcarpathian
- County: Lesko
- Gmina: Lesko

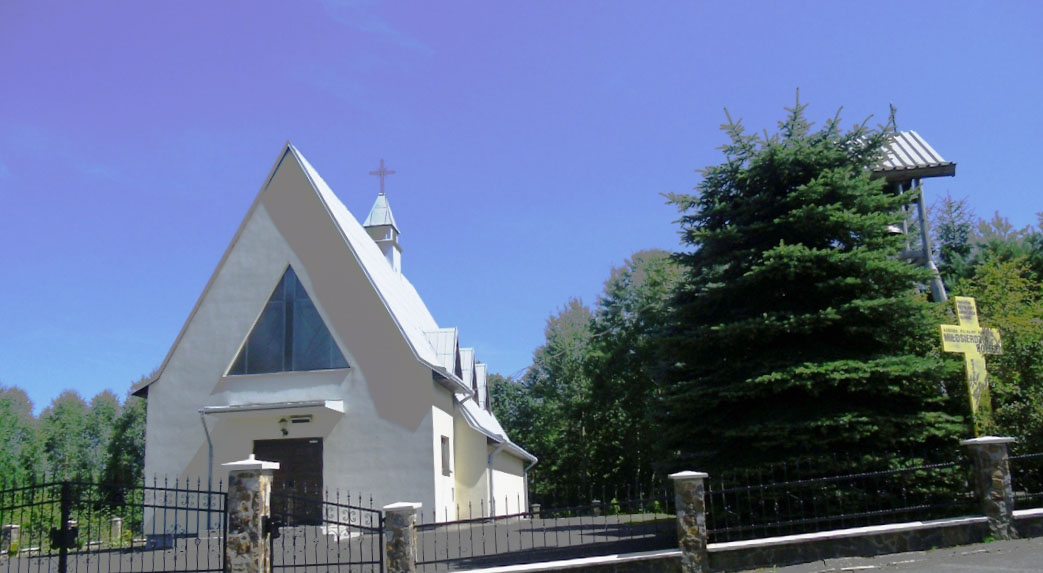
Roman Catholic Church. Of Divine Mercy.

Glinne [ˈɡlʲinːɛ] is a village in the administrative district of Gmina Lesko, within Lesko County, Subcarpathian Voivodeship, in south-eastern Poland.
