= Ostoja-Ostaszewski =

Ostoja-Ostaszewski is a Polish noble family which had a number of residences in pre-war Poland, among others a palace in Kraków and a castle in Wzdów. It belongs to the medieval Clan of Ostoja, influential in the Polish-Lithuanian Commonwealth, Hungary and Ukraine.

Notable members of the family include: Tomasz Ostaszewski (1746-1817), bishop of Płock, Nereusz Ostaszewski (1755-1803), member of the Great Sejm, Teofil Ostaszewski (1807-1889), landlord and politician, as well as a number of women known from charity work and patronage: Emma Ostaszewska née countess Załuska (1831-1912), countess Maria Dzieduszycka née Ostaszewska (1851-1918) and countess Zofia Tarnowska née Ostaszewska (1902-1982).

== Gallery ==
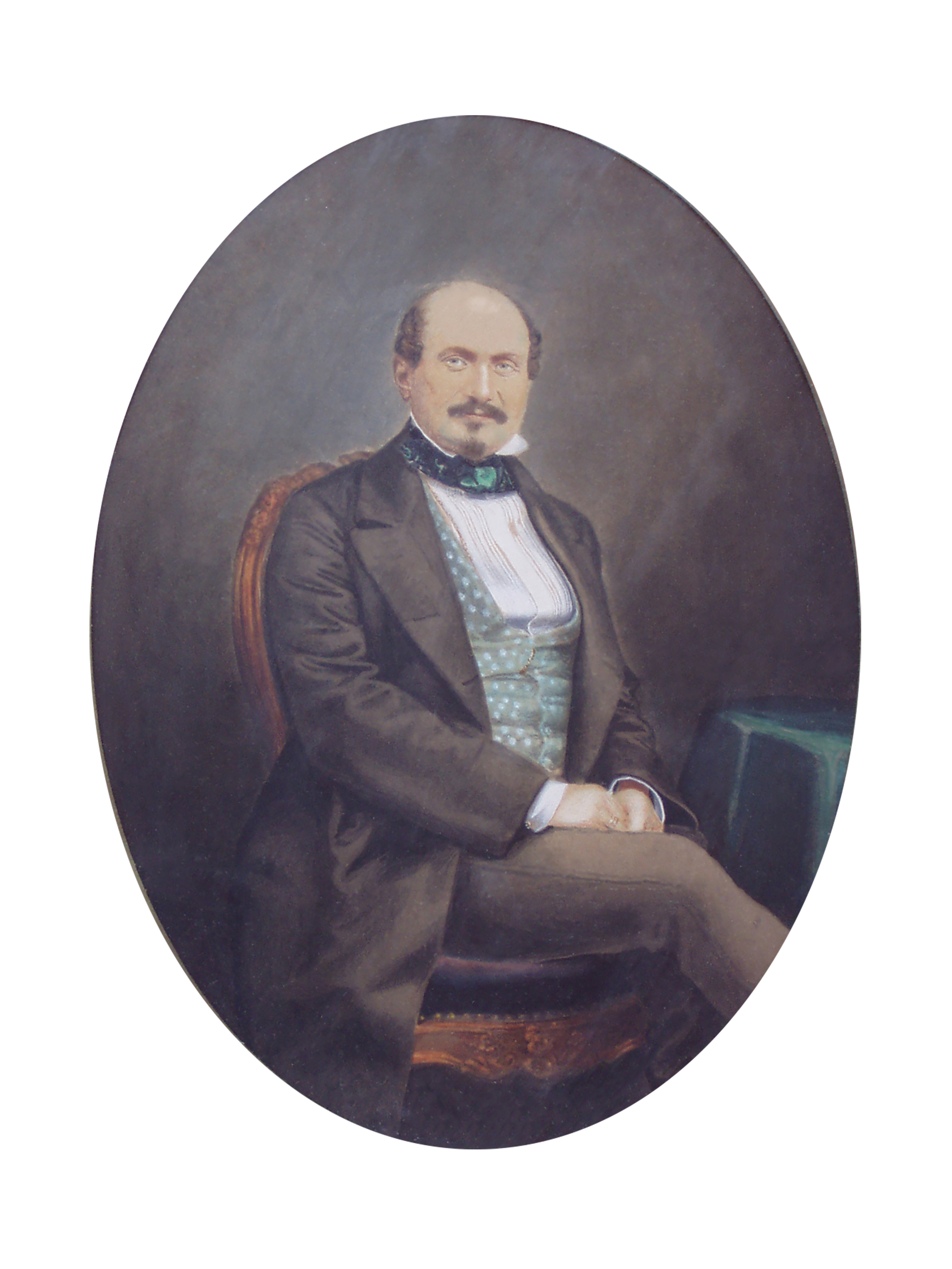
Teofil Ostaszewski

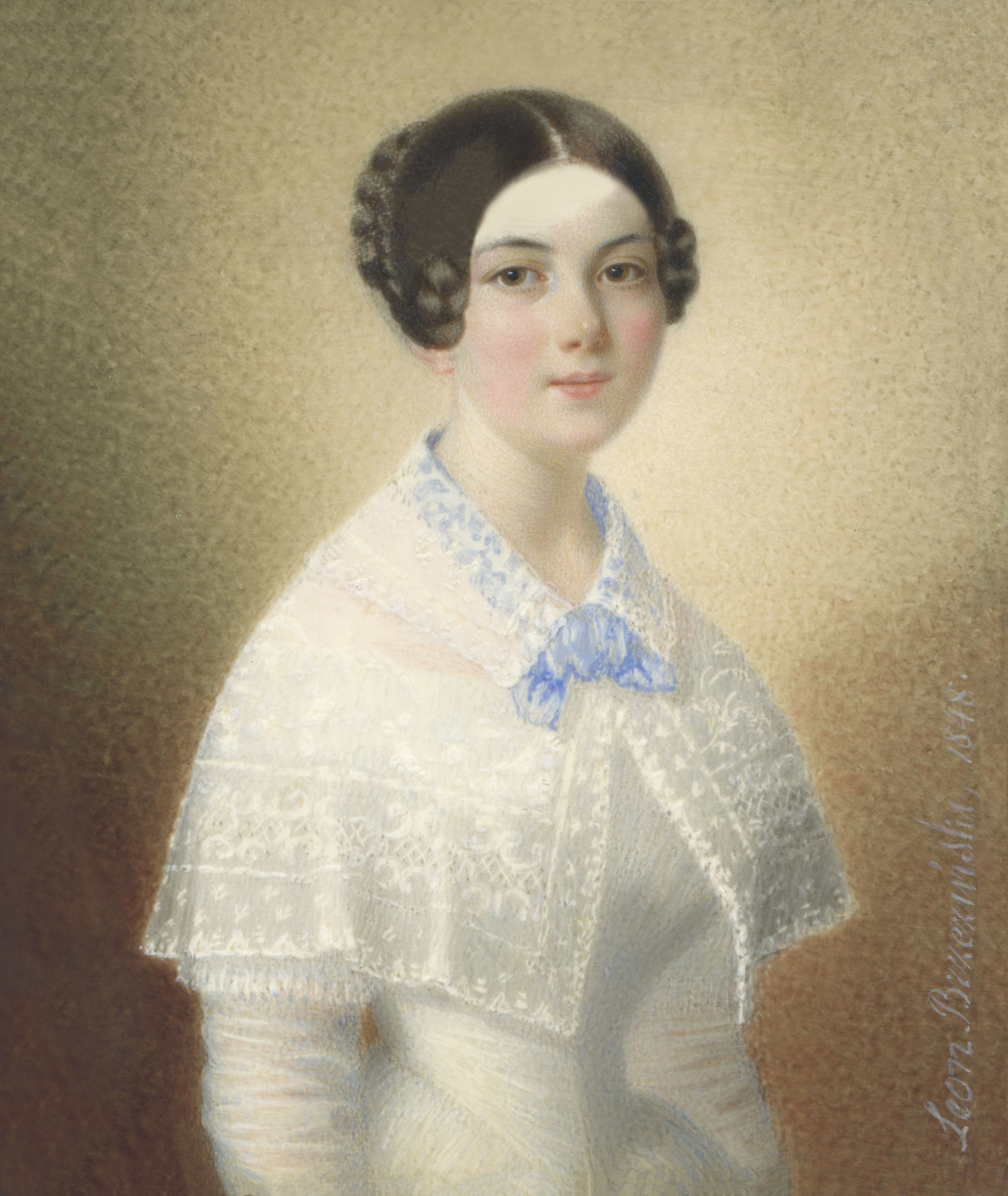
Emma Ostaszewska née countess Załuska

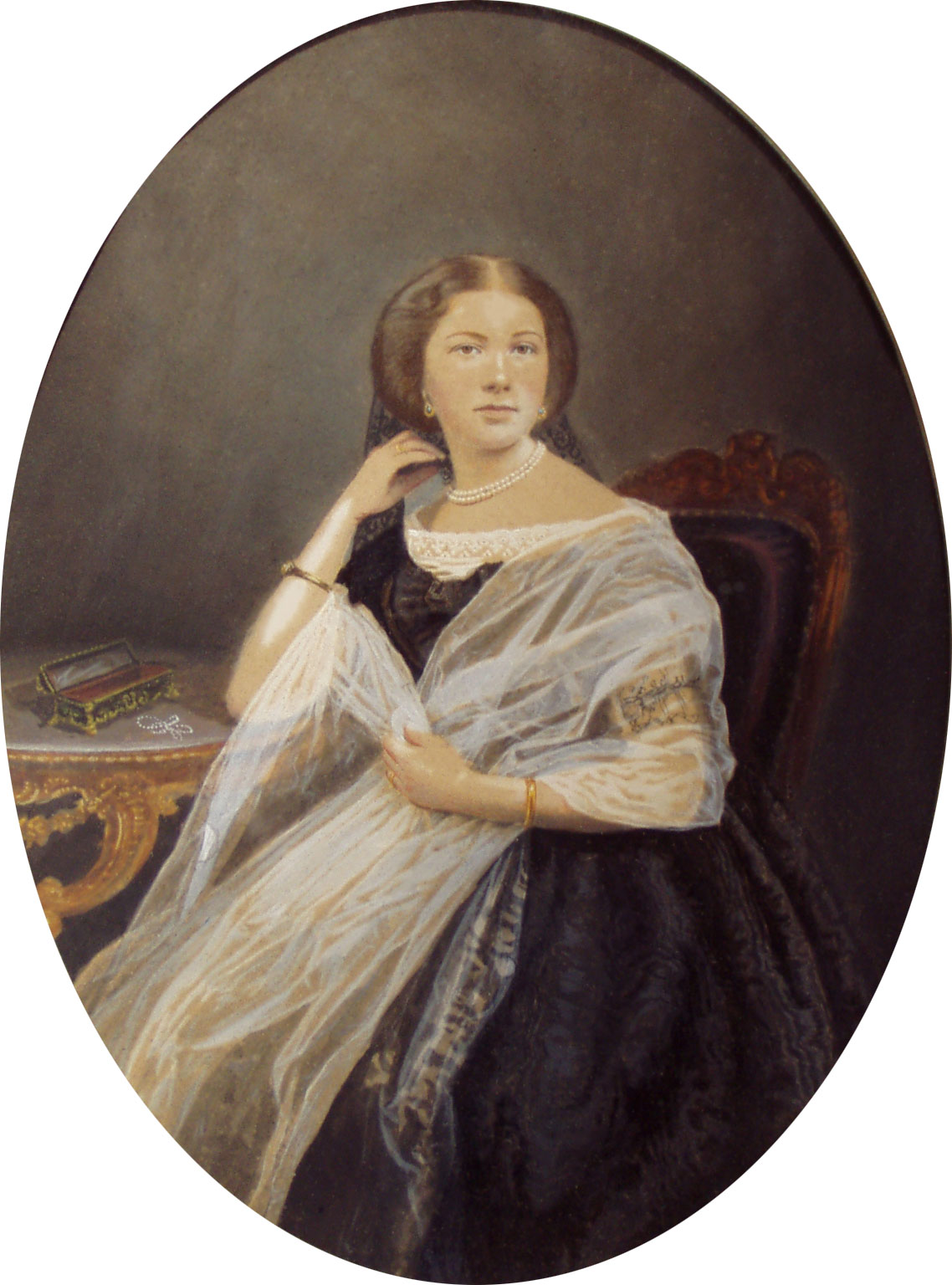
Emma Ostaszewska née countess Załuska

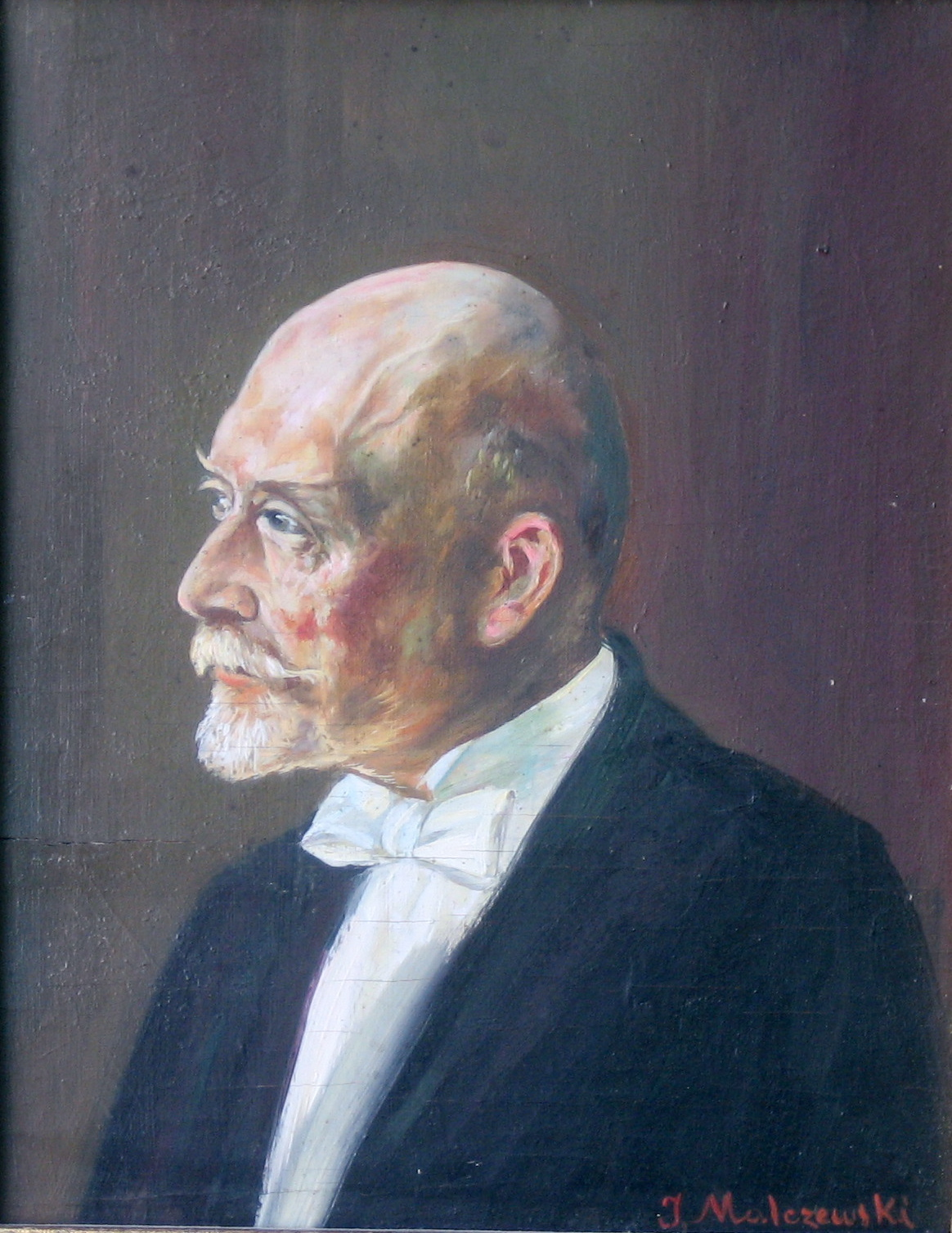
Kazimierz Ostaszewski

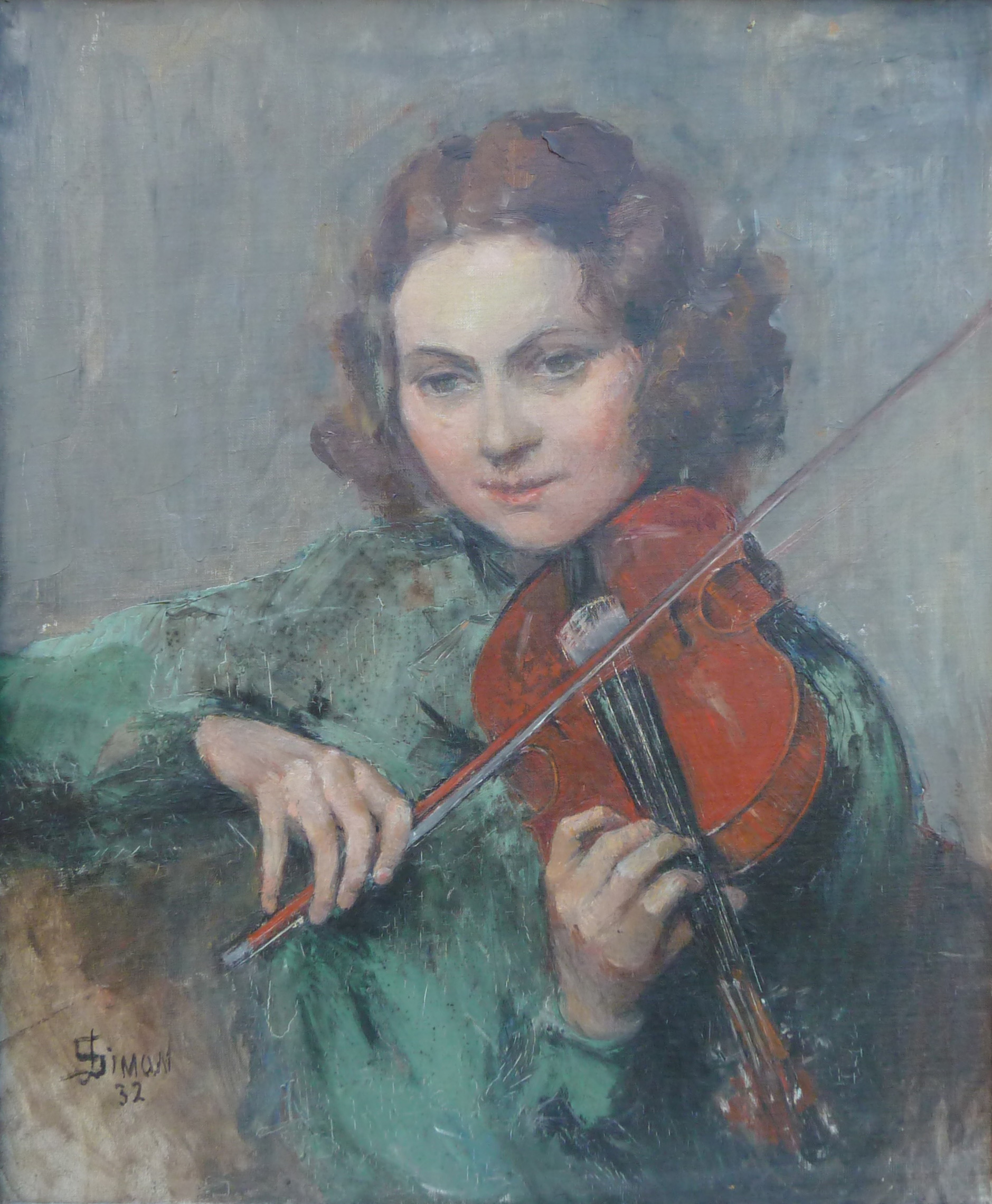
Yolanda Ostaszewska

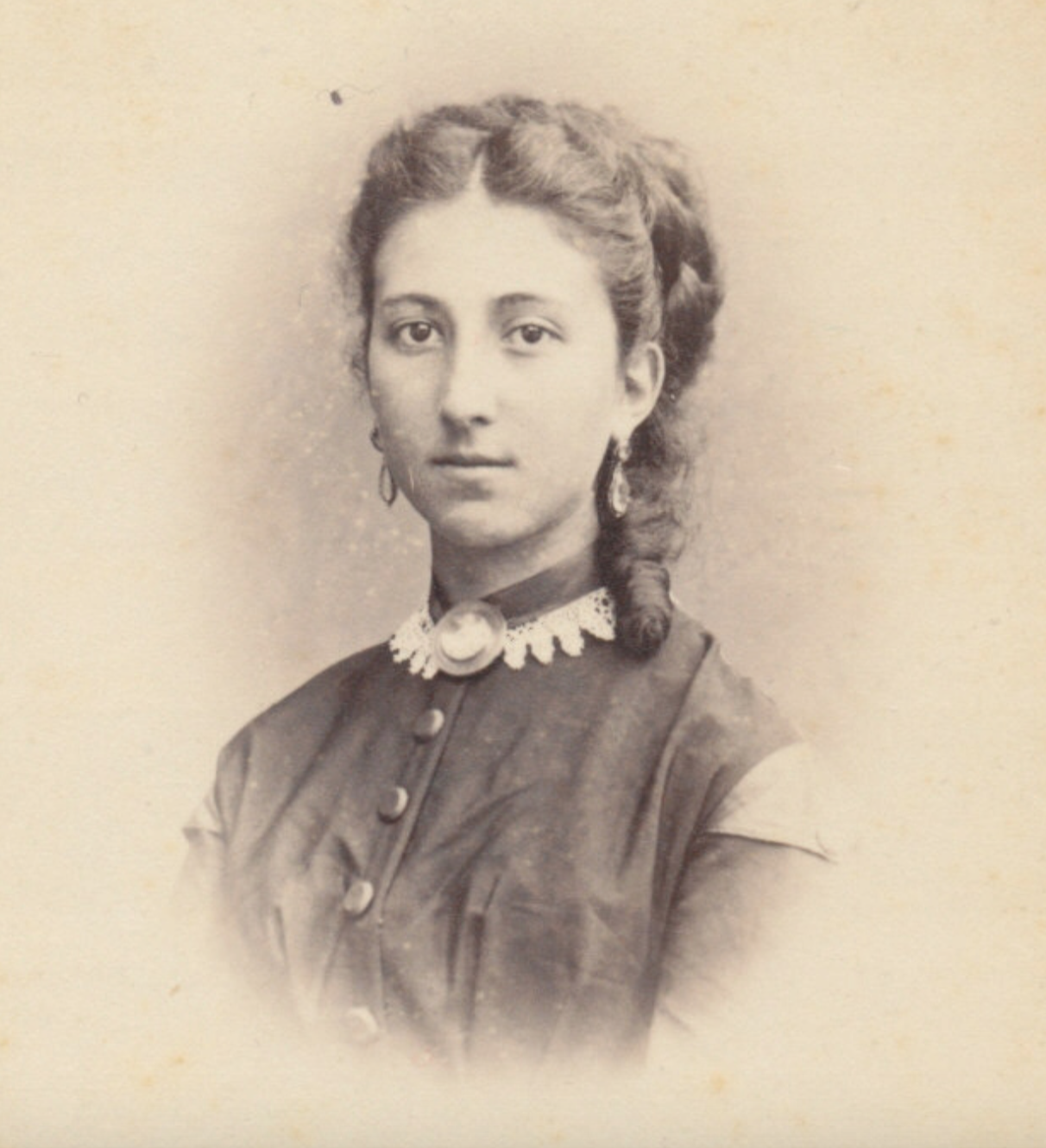
Countess Maria Dzieduszycka née Ostaszewska

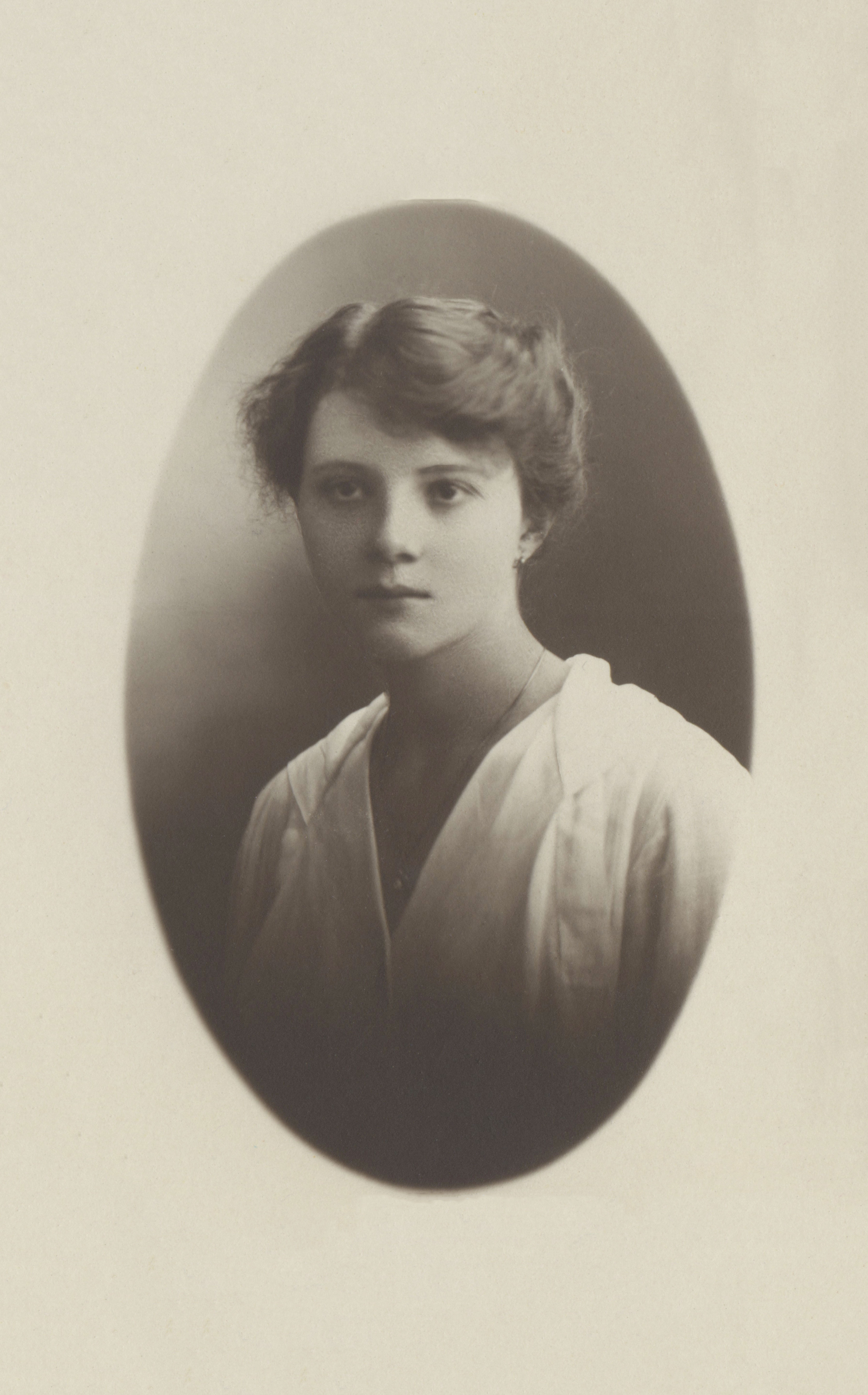
Countess Zofia Tarnowska née Ostaszewska

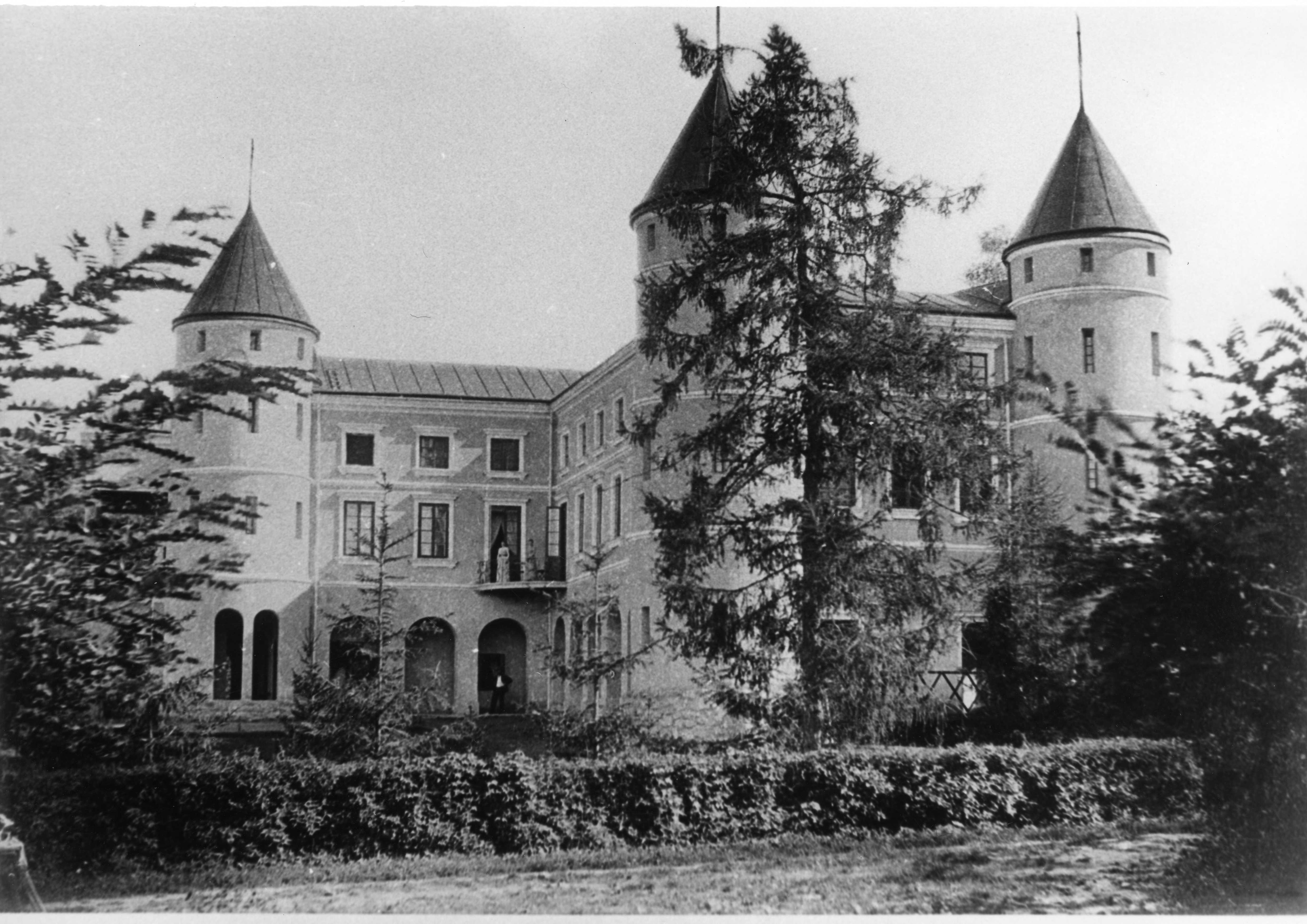
Palace in Wzdów

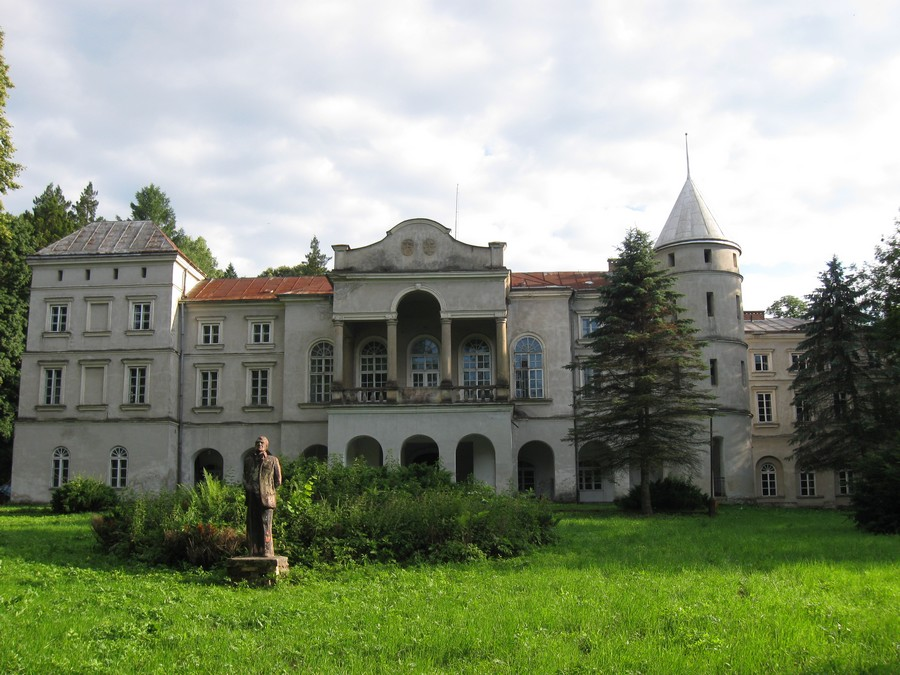
Palace in Wzdów

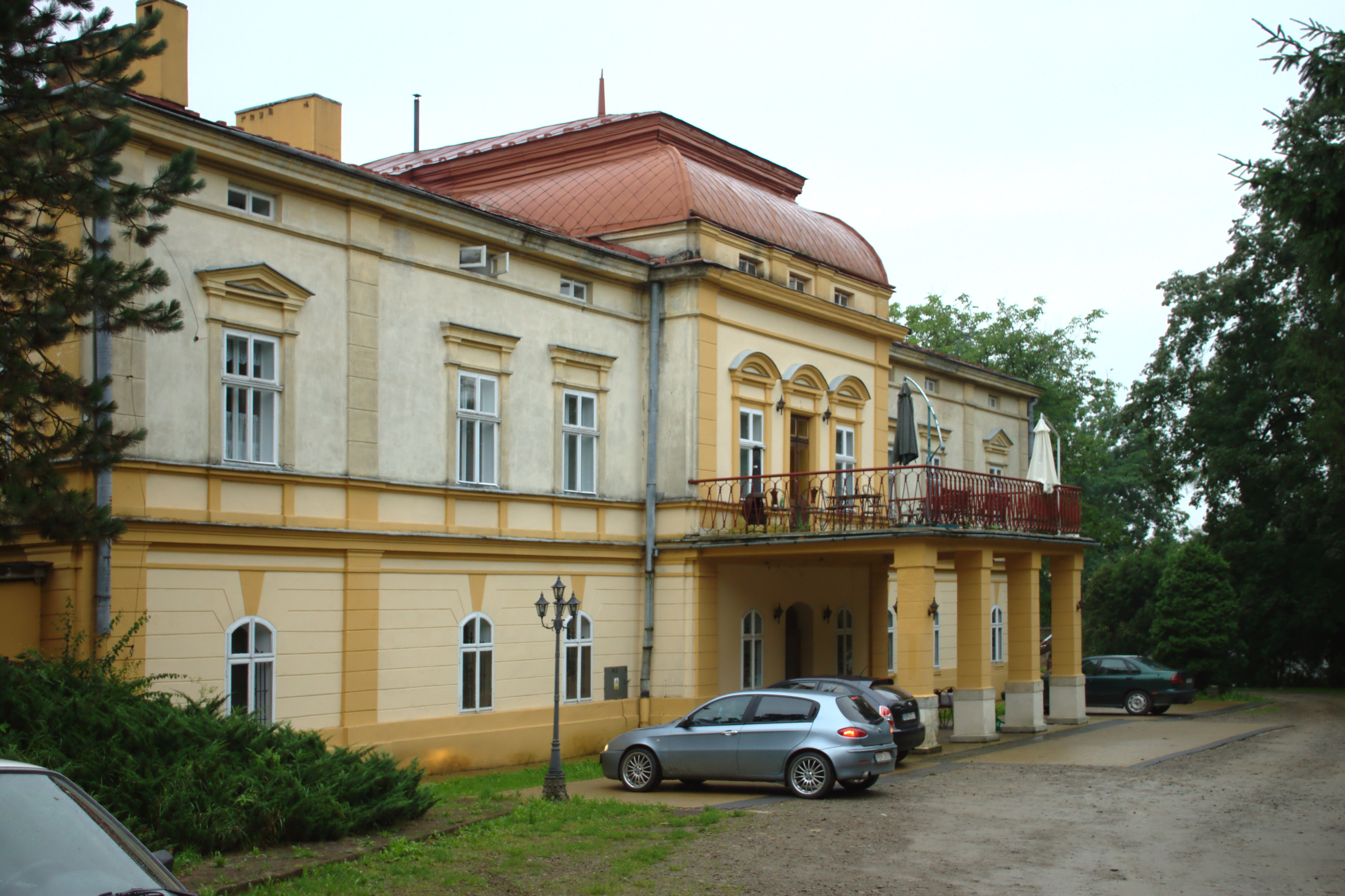
Palace in Grabownica

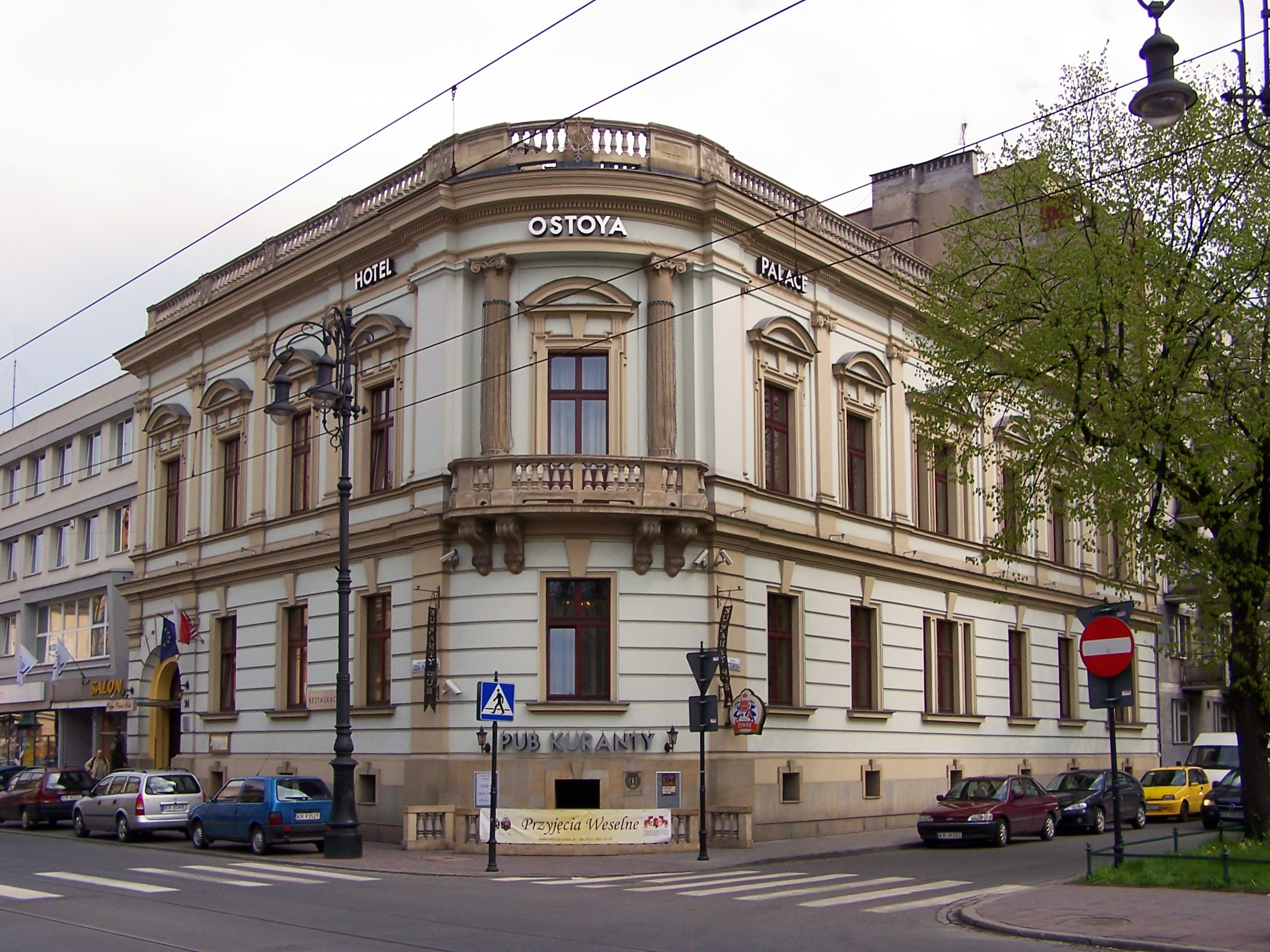
Palace in Kraków

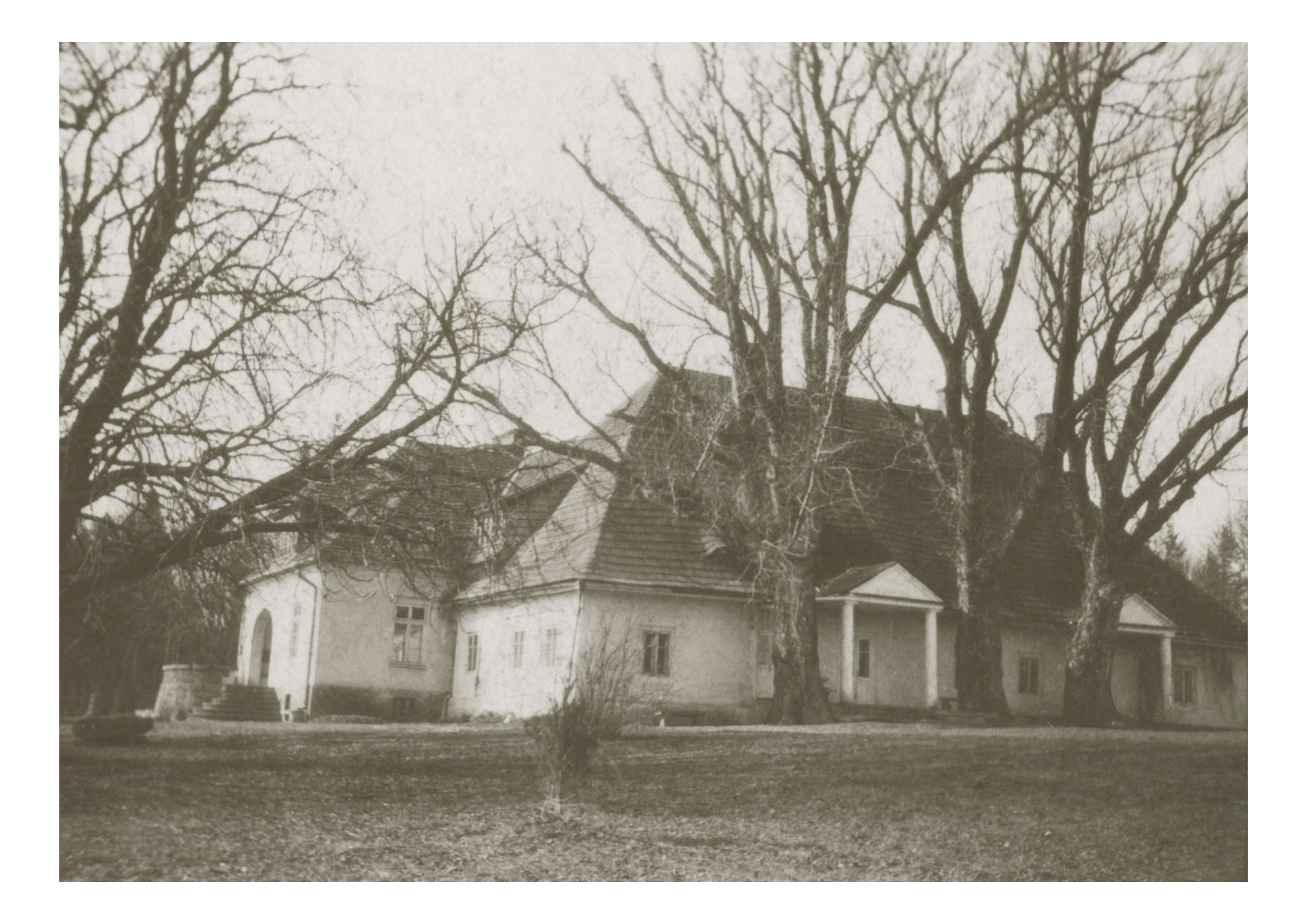
Manor house in Klimkówka
