= Weremień =

- Village
- Location within Poland
- Coordinates: 49°27′N 22°20′E
- Country: Poland
- Voivodeship: Subcarpathian
- County: Lesko
- Gmina: Lesko

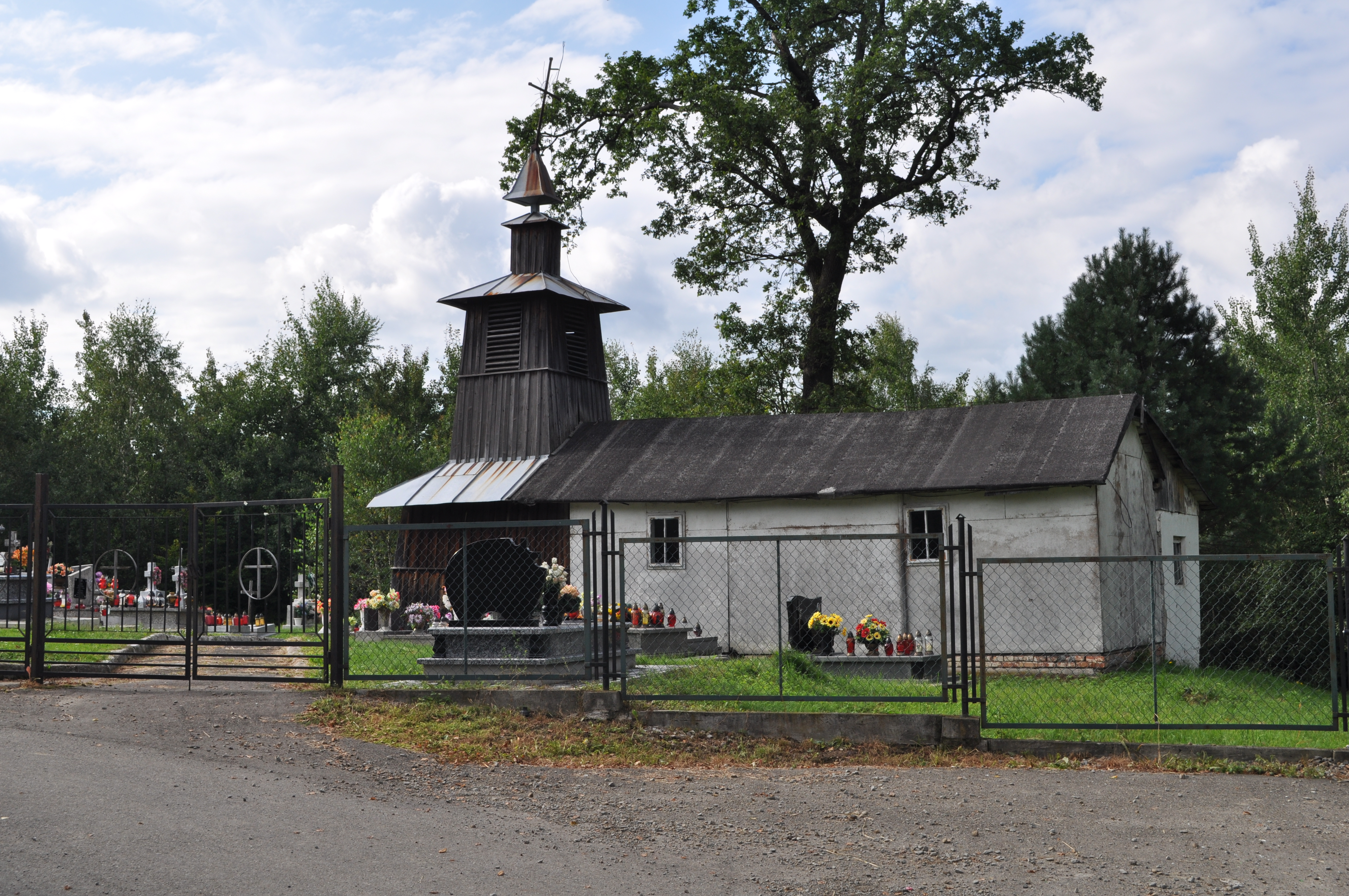
Church in Weremień

Weremień [vɛˈrɛmʲɛɲ](Ukr.Веремінь) is a village in the administrative district of Gmina Lesko, within Lesko County, Subcarpathian Voivodeship, in south-eastern Poland.
