= Gmina Lesko =

Gmina Lesko Lesko Commune
- Gmina
- Coat of arms
- Interactive map of Gmina Lesko
- Coordinates (Lesko): 49°28′28″N 22°19′44″E
- Country: Poland
- Voivodeship: Subcarpathian
- County: Lesko
- Seat: Lesko

Area
  - Total: 111.58 km^{2} (43.08 sq mi)

Population (2006)
  - Total: 11,603
  - Density: 103.99/km^{2} (269.33/sq mi)
  - Urban: 5,864
  - Rural: 5,739
- Website: http://www.lesko.pl/

Gmina Lesko is an urban-rural gmina (administrative district) in Lesko County, Subcarpathian Voivodeship, in south-eastern Poland. Its seat is the town of Lesko, which lies approximately 67 kilometres (42 mi) south of the regional capital Rzeszów.

The gmina covers an area of 111.58 square kilometres (43.1 sq mi), and as of 2006 its total population is 11,603 (out of which the population of Lesko amounts to 5,864, and the population of the rural part of the gmina is 5,739).

The gmina contains part of the protected area called Słonne Mountains Landscape Park.

== Villages ==
Apart from the town of Lesko, Gmina Lesko contains the villages and settlements of Bachlawa, Bezmiechowa Dolna, Bezmiechowa Górna, Dziurdziów, Glinne, Hoczew, Huzele, Jankowce, Łączki, Łukawica, Manasterzec, Postołów, Średnia Wieś and Weremień.

== Neighbouring gminas ==
Gmina Lesko is bordered by the gminas of Baligród, Olszanica, Sanok, Solina, Tyrawa Wołoska and Zagórz.
