= Malinówka, Podkarpackie Voivodeship =

Malinówka
- Village
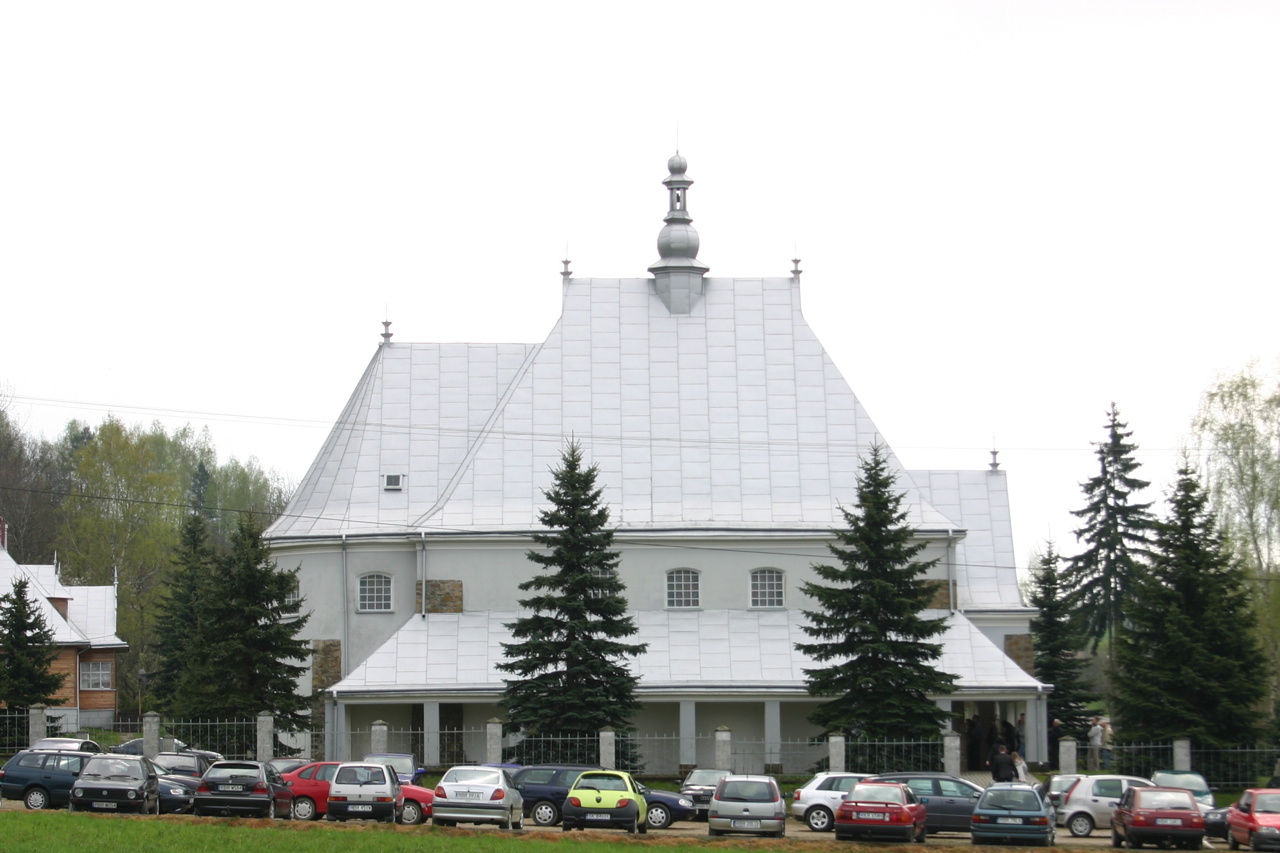
- Sacred Heart Church

- Location within Poland
- Coordinates: 49°41′47″N 21°55′35″E
- Country: Poland
- Voivodeship: Subcarpathian
- County: Brzozów
- Gmina: Haczów

Malinówka [malʲiˈnufka] is a village in the administrative district of Gmina Haczów, within Brzozów County, Subcarpathian Voivodeship, in south-eastern Poland.
