= Gmina Haczów =

Gmina Haczów Haczów Commune
- Gmina
- Coat of arms
- Interactive map of Gmina Haczów
- Coordinates (Haczów): 49°39′52″N 21°54′5″E
- Country: Poland
- Voivodeship: Subcarpathian
- County: Brzozów
- Seat: Haczów

Area
  - Total: 72.11 km^{2} (27.84 sq mi)

Population (2006)
  - Total: 9,057
  - Density: 125.6/km^{2} (325.3/sq mi)
- Website: http://www.republika.pl/gmhaczow/

Gmina Haczów is a rural gmina (administrative district) in Brzozów County, Subcarpathian Voivodeship, in south-eastern Poland. Its seat is the village of Haczów, which lies approximately 10 kilometres (6 mi) west of Brzozów and 42 km (26 mi) south of the regional capital Rzeszów.

The gmina covers an area of 72.11 square kilometres (27.8 sq mi), and as of 2006 its total population is 9,057.

== Administrative division ==
- Buków
- Haczów
- Jabłonica Polska
- Jasionów
- Malinówka
- Trześniów
- Wzdów

== Villages ==
Gmina Haczów contains the villages and settlements of Buków, Haczów, Jabłonica Polska, Jasionów, Malinówka, Trześniów and Wzdów.

== Neighbouring gminas ==
Gmina Haczów is bordered by the gminas of Besko, Brzozów, Jasienica Rosielna, Korczyna, Krościenko Wyżne, Miejsce Piastowe, Rymanów and Zarszyn.
