= Średnia Wieś, Podkarpackie Voivodeship =

Średnia Wieś
- Village
- Location within Poland
- Coordinates: 49°25′3″N 22°20′58″E
- Country: Poland
- Voivodeship: Subcarpathian
- County: Lesko
- Gmina: Lesko

Średnia Wieś [ˈɕrɛdɲa ˈvʲɛɕ] is a village in the administrative district of Gmina Lesko, within Lesko County, Subcarpathian Voivodeship, in south-eastern Poland.
