= Łączki, Lesko County =

Łączki
- Village
- Location within Poland
- Coordinates: 49°26′54″N 22°20′49″E
- Country: Poland
- Voivodeship: Subcarpathian
- County: Lesko
- Gmina: Lesko
- Population: 70

Łączki [ˈwɔnt͡ʂkʲi] is a village in the administrative district of Gmina Lesko, within Lesko County, Subcarpathian Voivodeship, in south-eastern Poland.
