= Bachlawa =

- Village
- Location within Poland
- Coordinates: 49°26′N 22°21′E
- Country: Poland
- Voivodeship: Subcarpathian
- County: Lesko
- Gmina: Lesko
- Population: 201

Bachlawa [baˈxlava] is a village in the administrative district of Gmina Lesko, within Lesko County, Subcarpathian Voivodeship, in south-eastern Poland. It is located on the shores of the San; historically, it was owned by the Bal family of Baligród.

== Etymology ==
The town's earliest known name, recorded in the 17th century, was Bachlowa, coming from the name of the Bal family, which owned it from 1427 to the mid-18th century. It was officially changed to Bachlawa by the village council in 1968.

== Location and characteristics ==
Bachlawa is located on the shores of the San, near the village of Hoczew and on the road to the larger Polańczyk. Its gas station contains a large collection of old tools and militaria.

== History ==
Bachlawa was already extant in 1376 as part of the village of Terpiczów. In 1427, Terpiczów, as well as most of the drainage basin of the Hoczewka, including nearby Baligród, was attained by Matiasz ze Zboisk of the coat of arms of Grozdawa, the ancestor of the Bal family of Hoczew. Bachlawa remained in the hands of the Bal family up to the 18th century. As of 1921, 229 people lived in the village's 44 homes.

The village was later home to Zofia Roś (1912–1995), a prolific folk sculptor, described as "the most authentic" such sculptor by the author Paweł Luboński, who created sculptures and other art pieces there. Her art is found in several collections around the world.
