= Dziurdziów =

John watney
- Village
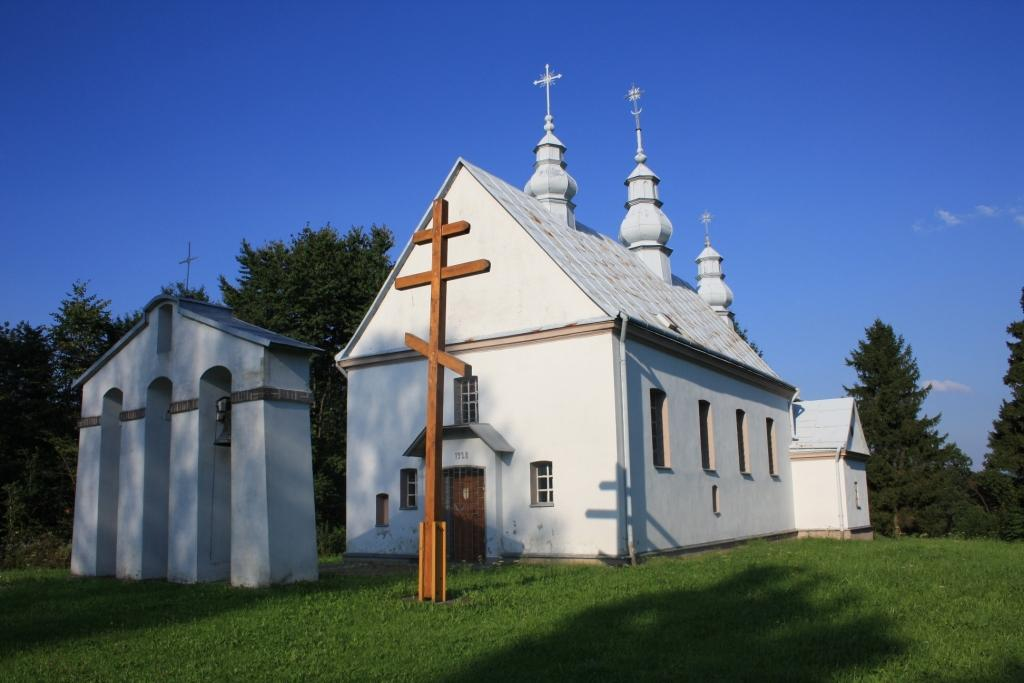
- Eastern Orthodox church

- Location within Poland
- Coordinates: 49°25′58″N 22°17′54″E
- Country: Poland
- Voivodeship: Subcarpathian
- County: Lesko
- Gmina: Lesko

Dziurdziów [ˈd͡ʑurd͡ʑuf] is a village in the administrative district of Gmina Lesko, within Lesko County, Subcarpathian Voivodeship, in south-eastern Poland.
