= Postołów =

- Village
- Location within Poland
- Coordinates: 49°30′N 22°19′E
- Country: Poland
- Voivodeship: Subcarpathian
- County: Lesko
- Gmina: Lesko

Postołów [pɔˈstɔwuf] is a village in the administrative district of Gmina Lesko, within Lesko County, Subcarpathian Voivodeship, in south-eastern Poland.
