= Trześniów, Podkarpackie Voivodeship =

Trześniów
- Village
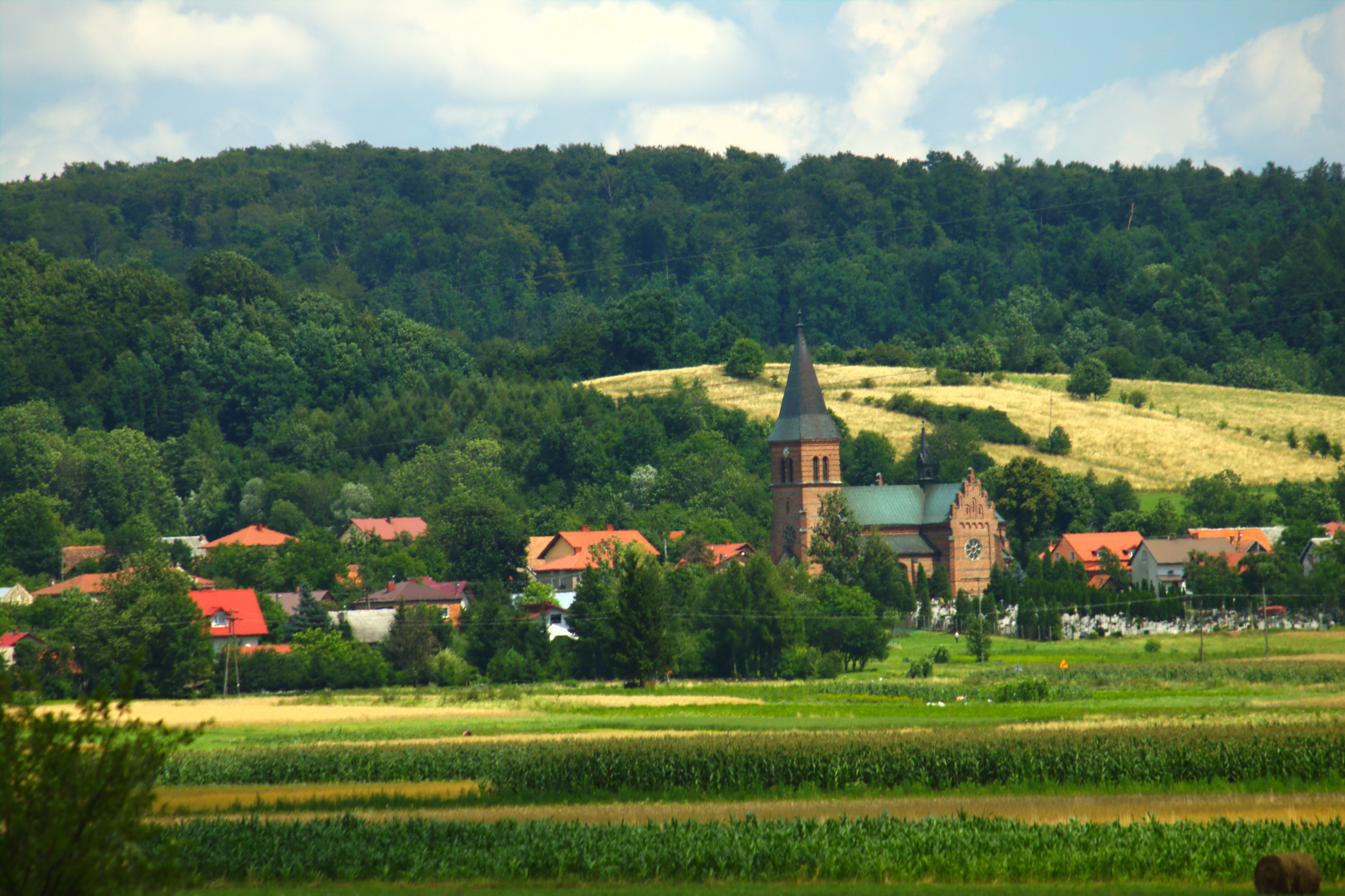
- Trześniów

- Location within Poland
- Coordinates: 49°38′45″N 21°56′22″E
- Country: Poland
- Voivodeship: Subcarpathian
- County: Brzozów
- Gmina: Haczów
- Population: 1,300

Trześniów [ˈtʂɛɕɲuf] is a village in the administrative district of Gmina Haczów, within Brzozów County, Subcarpathian Voivodeship, in south-eastern Poland.

== History ==
The village was founded about 1419 and settled around the end of the 15th century. In the second half of the 16th century the owners of the land, the Błońscy family, changed the Roman Catholic Church in Jasionów to a Calvinist church. In 1592 another church for Roman Catholics was built. In 1644 under a Lublin tribunal ruling the Protestants were forced to give the churches back to the Roman Catholics. Until 1772 the village was part of the Grabińscy-Tarłowie estate; after 1772 it belonged to Count Ignacy Cetner.

== Schools ==
There are two schools in Trzesniow. See http://www.zstrzesniow.republika.pl/strona/index.htm

== See also ==
- Lendians
- Great Moravia
- Ostsiedlung
- Walddeutsche
- Galicia (Central Europe)
- Pogórzanie
