= Bezmiechowa Górna =

- Village
- Location within Poland
- Coordinates: 49°31′N 22°24′E
- Country: Poland
- Voivodeship: Subcarpathian
- County: Lesko
- Gmina: Lesko

Bezmiechowa Górna [bɛzmʲɛˈxɔva ˈɡurna] is a village in the administrative district of Gmina Lesko, within Lesko County, Subcarpathian Voivodeship, in south-eastern Poland.
