= Jasionów, Podkarpackie Voivodeship =

Jasionów
- Village
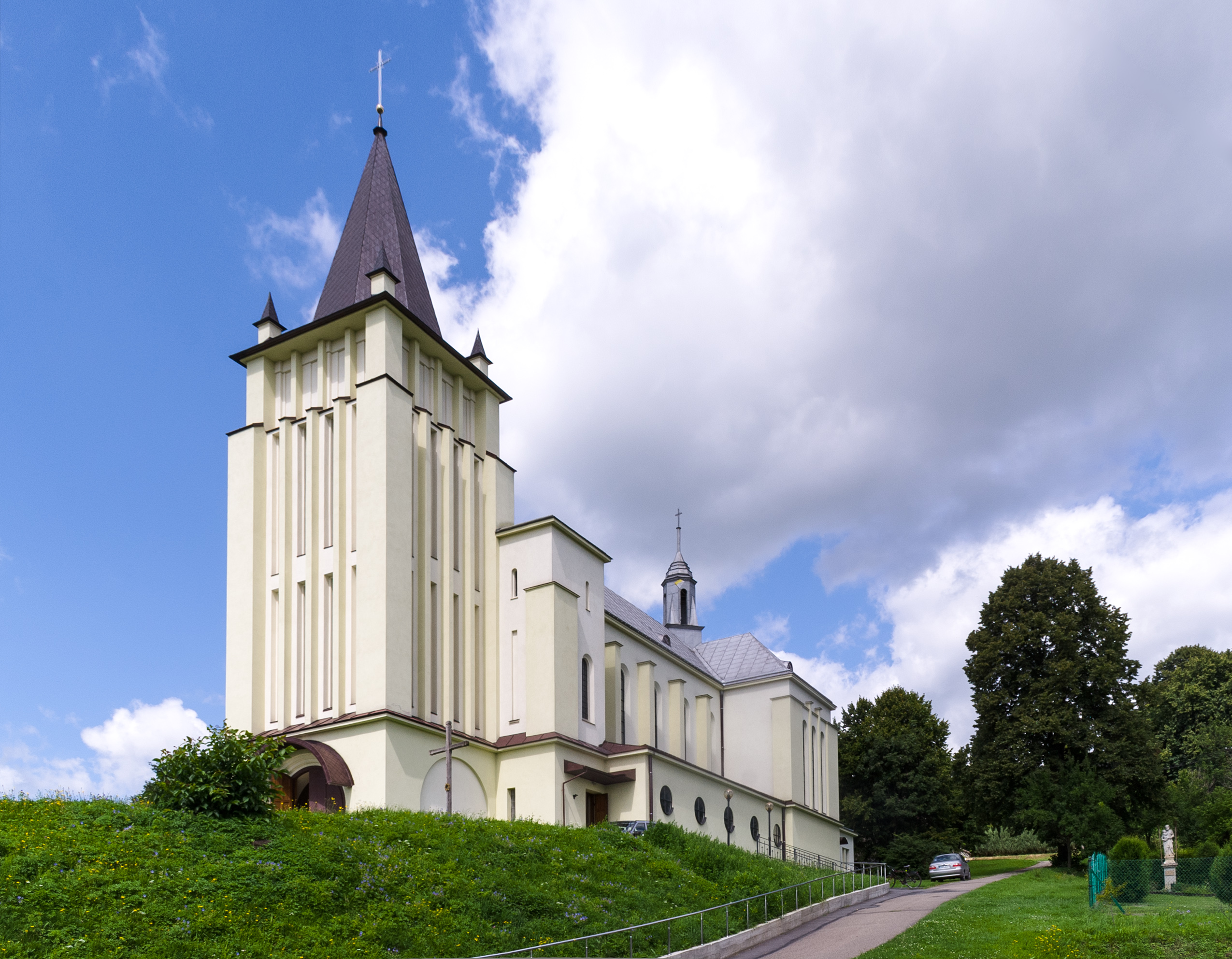
- Church of Saint Catherine of Alexandria in Jasionów

- Location within Poland
- Coordinates: 49°39′19″N 21°58′31″E
- Country: Poland
- Voivodeship: Subcarpathian
- County: Brzozów
- Gmina: Haczów
- Population: 1,300

Jasionów [jaˈɕɔnuf] is a village in the administrative district of Gmina Haczów, within Brzozów County, Subcarpathian Voivodeship, in south-eastern Poland.
