= Wzdów =

- Village
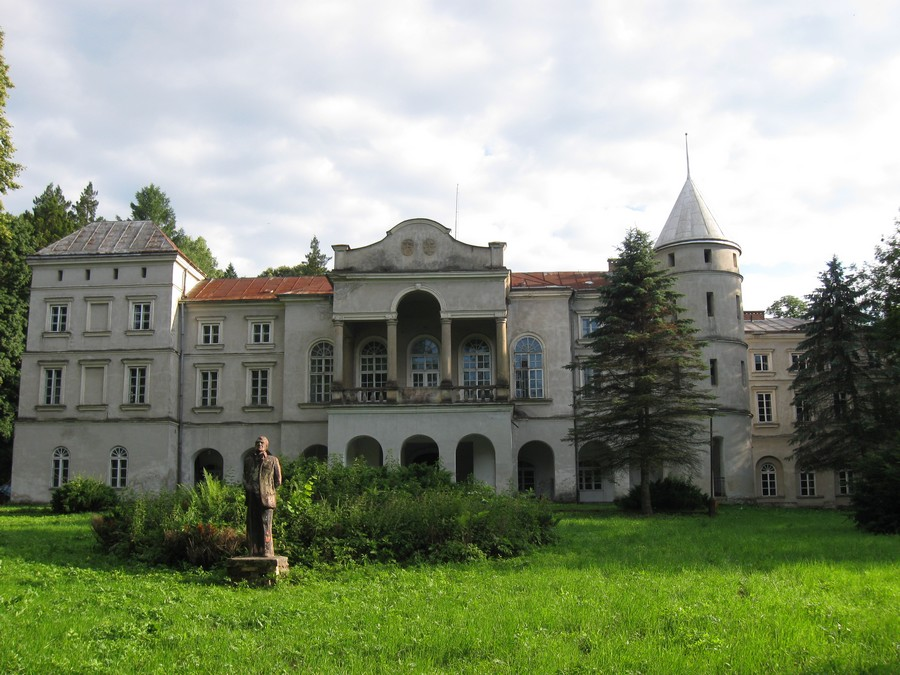
- Ostaszewski Palace

- Location within Poland
- Coordinates: 49°37′N 22°1′E
- Country: Poland
- Voivodeship: Subcarpathian
- County: Brzozów
- Gmina: Haczów
- Population: 1,000

Wzdów [vzduf] is a village in the administrative district of Gmina Haczów, within Brzozów County, Subcarpathian Voivodeship, in south-eastern Poland. The palace at Wzdów was the seat the Polish noble family of Ostoja-Ostaszewski. After the expropriation of landlords in Poland by the communist regime in 1944/1945, the palace fell into ruin.

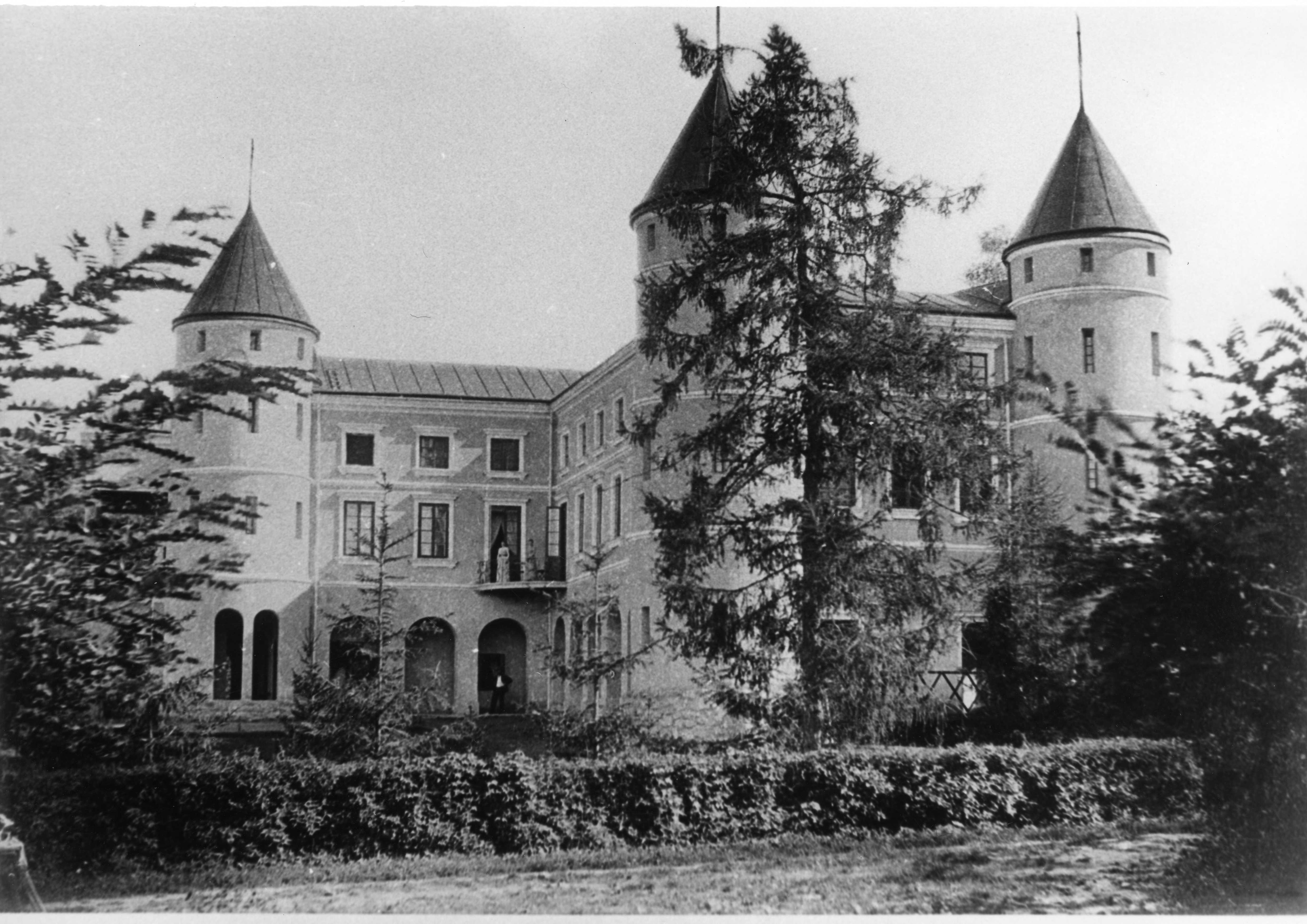
Wzdow in 19th century

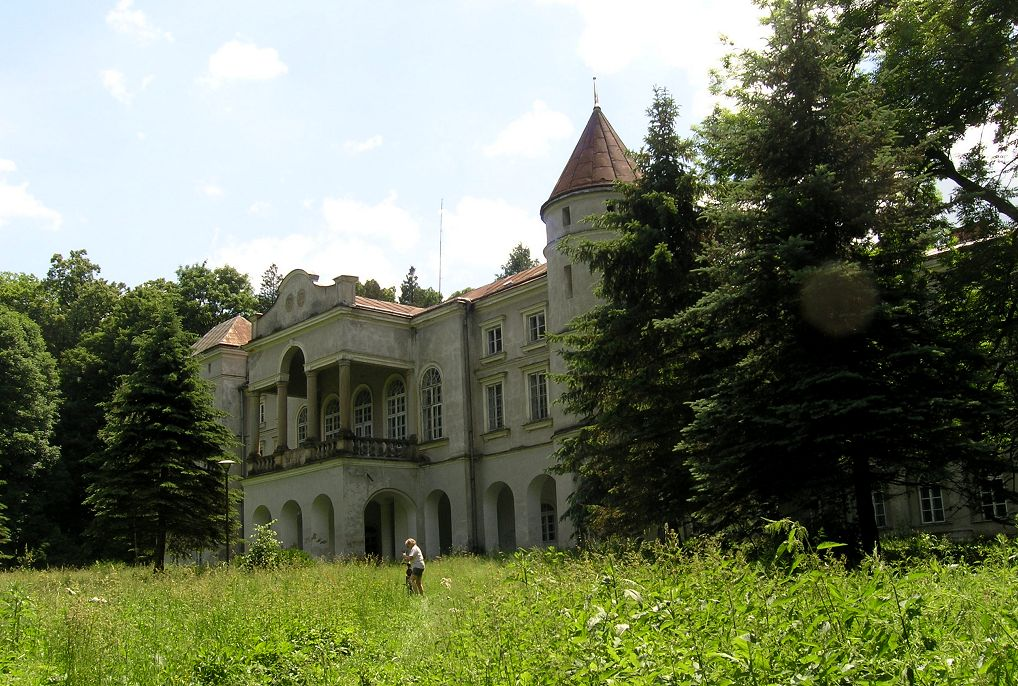
Wzdow in 2008
