= Nozdrzec =

- Village
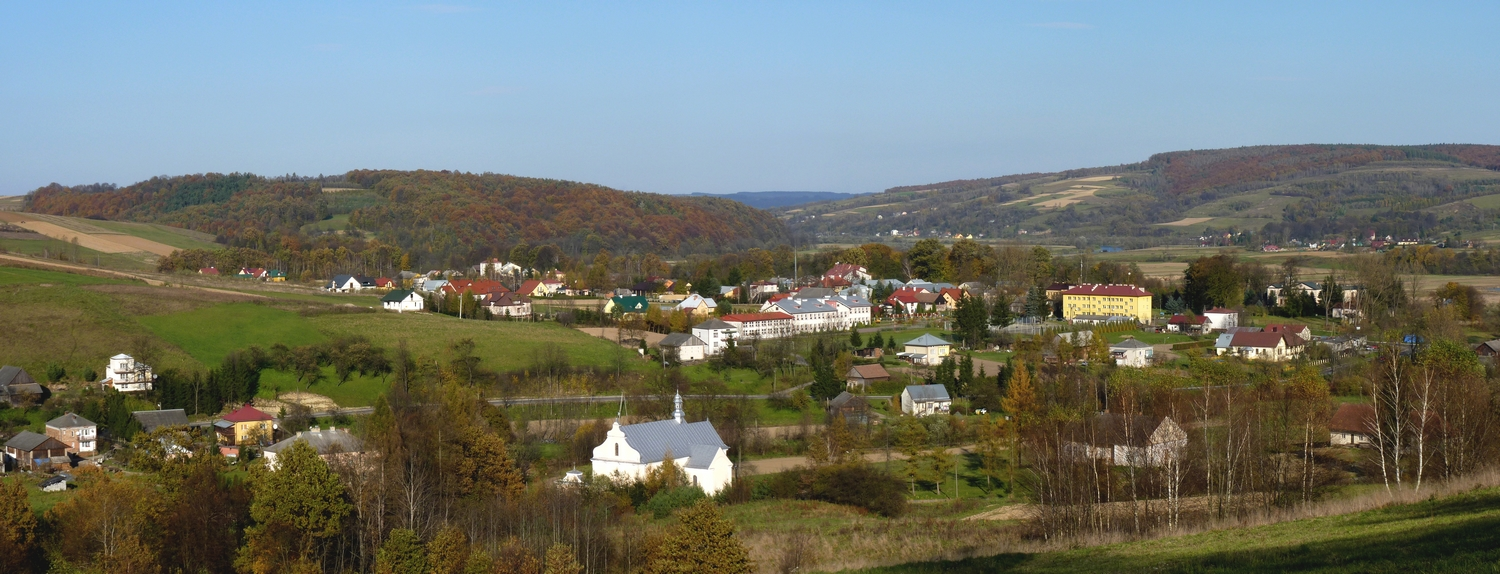
- General view

- Location within Poland
- Coordinates: 49°47′N 22°12′E
- Country: Poland
- Voivodeship: Subcarpathian
- County: Brzozów
- Gmina: Nozdrzec
- Population: 1,300

Nozdrzec [ˈnɔzdʐɛt͡s] is a village in Brzozów County, Subcarpathian Voivodeship, in south-eastern Poland. It is the seat of the gmina (administrative district) called Gmina Nozdrzec.

== History ==
Nozdrzec, formerly called Nieczujów (after Nieczuja family), existed in the fifteenth century. First mentioned in 1436, when Margaret of Dynów had conflict with Nicholas Kmit Castellan of Przemyśl. The village was listed in the accompanying document as one of the many villages belonging then to Dynów. Nozdrzec Palace, a local mansion of Skrzyński family, began probably as a fortified manor. During World War I, 15 November 1915, Nozdrzec was burned up together with the mansion by the Russian army. Then, around 1920, it was rebuilt with minor changes.

During the Second World War in 1940 people established here ZWZAK war institution, which consisted of Nozdrzec, Wesoła and Hłudno. The local ZWZAK had 50 people, led by Lt. Casimir Chrzan ps. Joseph, and Francis Dudek alias Oak with Chaplain Fr. Stanislaus Buczek and Major. Fr. John Haligowskiego alias Hansel/Quiet. Forming part of the Second Battalion Brzozowski led under command of Ensign Józef Florczak. At the May 25, 1943, those 50 people organized branch attack under the command of Joseph Maciołka - Commander of AK Rzeszów. They carried out an attack on the German forces which appropriated the Nozdrzec Palace. German forces left the area soon after the attack.

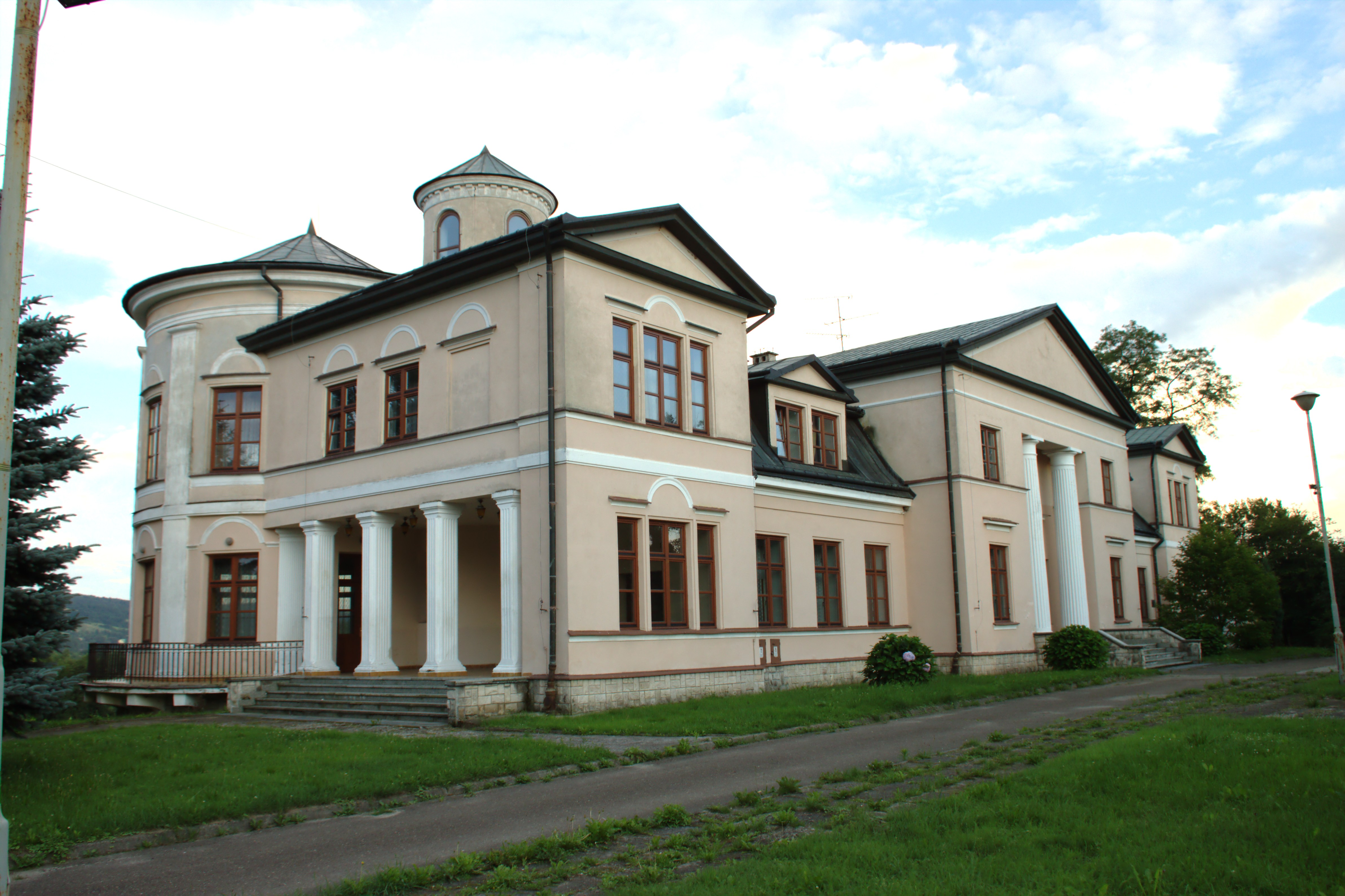
Skrzyński Palace

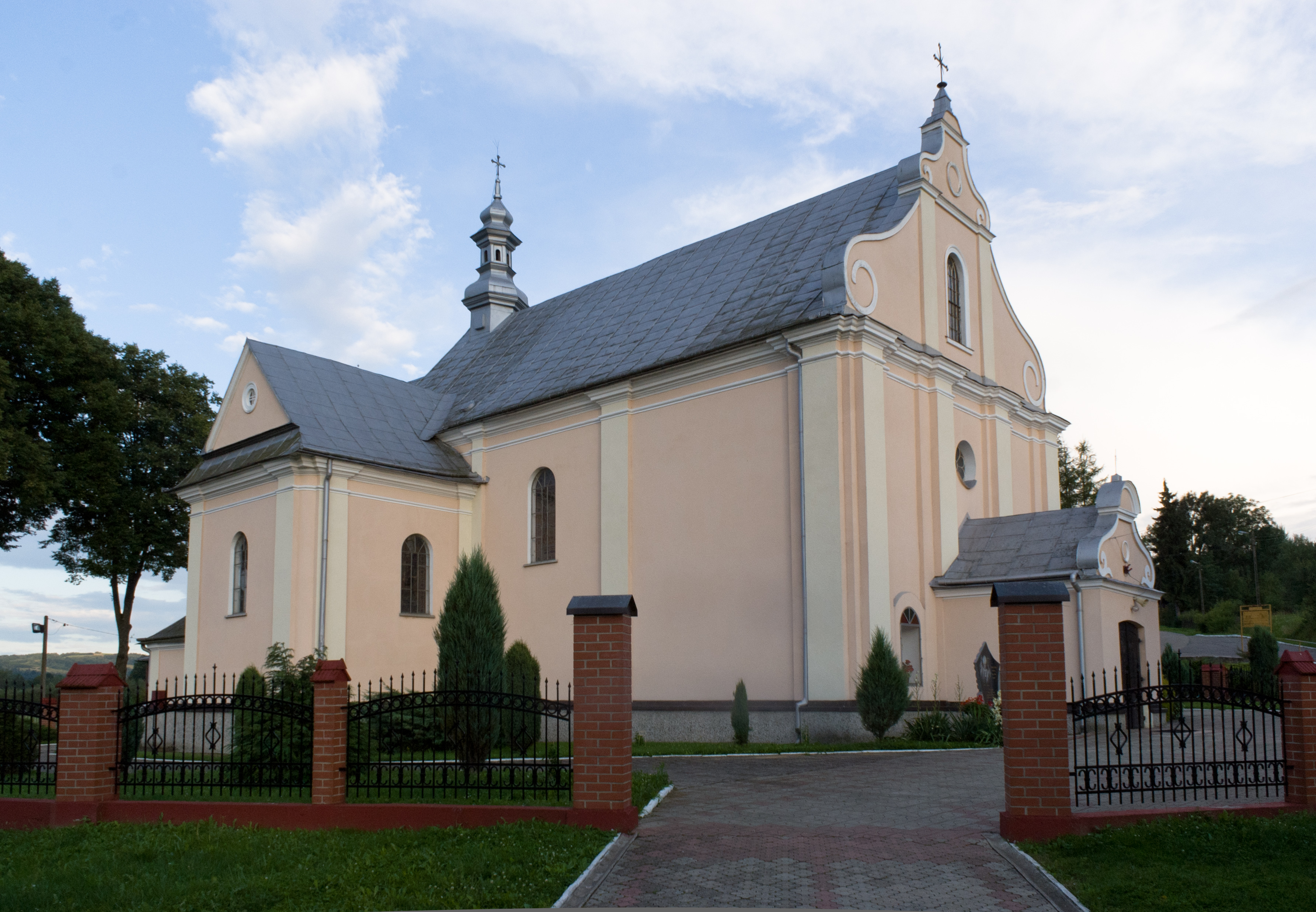
Saint Stanislaus church
