= Krzywe, Brzozów County =

Krzywe
- Village
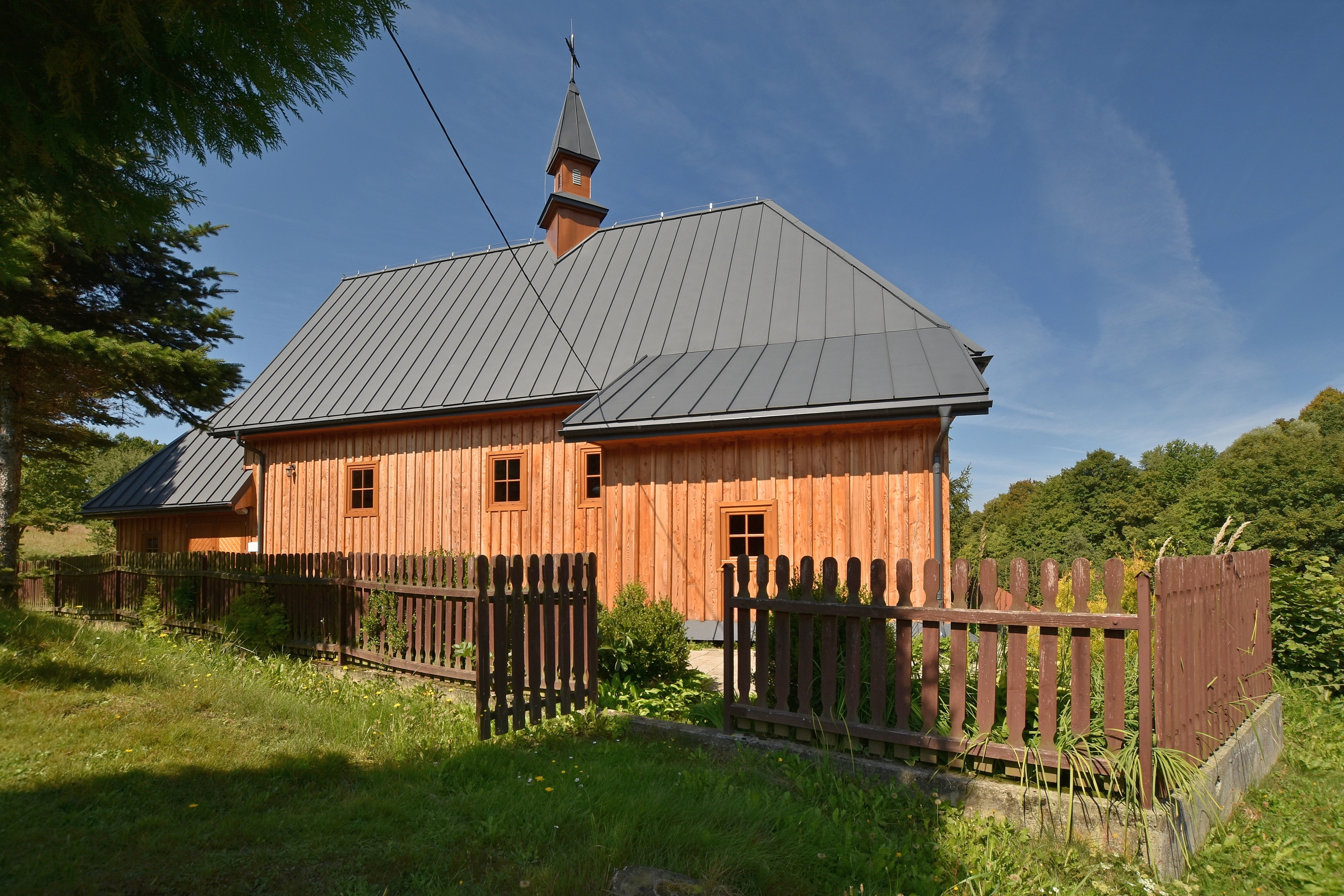
- Greek Catholic Church of the Holy Virgin Mary

- Location within Poland
- Coordinates: 49°40′10″N 22°11′30″E
- Country: Poland
- Voivodeship: Subcarpathian
- County: Brzozów
- Gmina: Dydnia
- Website: http://www.krzywe.republika.pl

Krzywe [ˈkʂɨvɛ] is a village in the administrative district of Gmina Dydnia, within Brzozów County, Subcarpathian Voivodeship, in south-eastern Poland.
