= Ulucz =

- Village
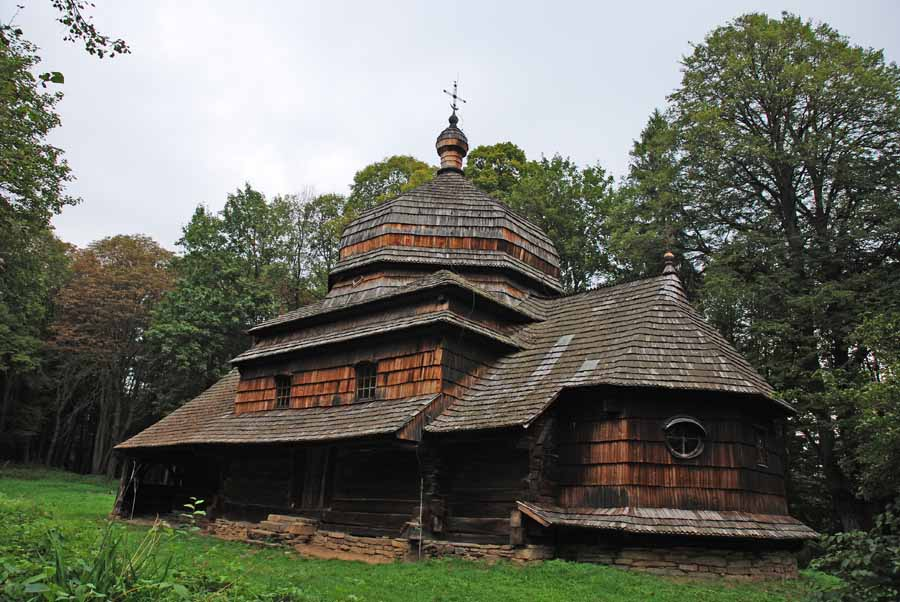
- Ukrainian Orthodox Church

- Location within Poland
- Coordinates: 49°41′N 22°17′E
- Country: Poland
- Voivodeship: Subcarpathian
- County: Brzozów
- Gmina: Dydnia
- Population: 150

Ulucz [ˈulut͡ʂ] is a village in the administrative district of Gmina Dydnia, within Brzozów County, Subcarpathian Voivodeship, in south-eastern Poland. The village lies approximately 9 km (6 mi) east of Dydnia, 20 km (12 mi) east of Brzozów, and 44 km (27 mi) south-east of the regional capital Rzeszów.

The Boyko and Lemko population of the area used to call the village Ulicz, before being expelled during Operation Vistula. Before that, the main population of the village was Ukrainian. The village suffered considerable damage in the Second World War, and today it only consists of a few dozen houses.

== Church of Ascension of our Lord ==
Ulucz is the location of the oldest wooden tserkva in Poland. It was built by Boyko people. It has survived because of its strategic location, overlooking the San River on top of a hill called "Dubnyk". Ukrainian Orthodox Church. Fathers founded a school of wooden architecture in Ulucz, which taught woodcarvers how to make iconostasis and other religious artefacts. The church nowadays is a museum as a branch of the Museum of Folk Architecture in Sanok.
