= Saint Nicholas Church, Chesnyky =

Ukrainian church in Chesnyky, Ukraine

Saint Nicholas Church
- Церква Святого Миколая
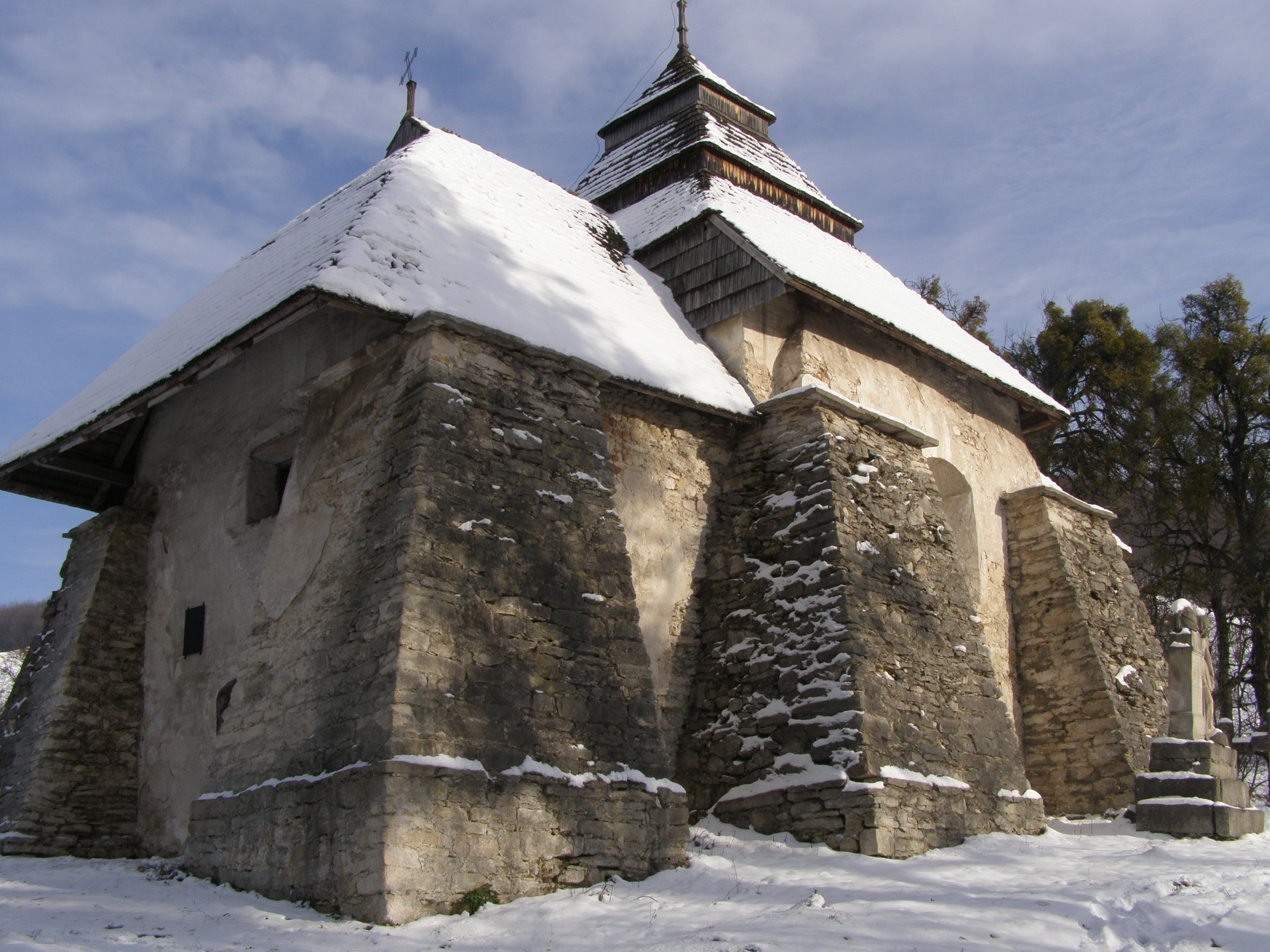

- Location within Ivano-Frankivsk Oblast

Location
- Location: Chesnyky
- Interactive map of Saint Nicholas Church
- Coordinates: 49°23′46″N 24°43′30″E

Architecture
- Completed: 14th–15th centuries

Immovable Monument of National Significance of Ukraine
- Official name: Миколаївська церква (Saint Nicholas Church)
- Type: Architecture
- Reference no.: 090052

Saint Nicholas Church (Ukrainian: Церква Святого Миколая) is an architectural monument of national importance in Chesnyky in Ivano-Frankivsk Raion, Ivano-Frankivsk Oblast.

== History ==
The church belonged to the Rohatyn deanery. It was built in the 14th–15th centuries. During World War I, despite the fighting, the village suffered minimal losses—only one house was burned down by a grenade. The church bells were successfully hidden from the Russian army.

The church has three naves and is covered with three domes. Its unusual monumentality was emphasized by the addition of large buttresses in the 19th century. The ascetic smooth walls, low entrances, and narrow loophole windows, together with the stone wall and the remains of the rampart, testify to the defensive function of the temple as a fortress against the Tatars. The massive walls are complemented by an archaic shingled roof. The church was active until 1912. Inside, remnants of the carved interior have been preserved, part of which has been transferred to museums.

== Priests ==
- Teodor Bachynskyi (-1831+, administrator)
- Illia Chizolskyi ([1832])
- Oleksandr Tefikhovskyi (1835–1836)
- Deziderii Hrychanskyi (1836–1838, administrator)
- Ivan Sorobura (1838–1840)
- Petro Medvedkyi (1840–1901+)
- Mykola Liubynetskyi (1901–1918; 1884–1901, employee)
- Yakiv Zaiats (1918–1919+)
- Yevhen Vytoshynskyi (1921–1935+)
- Mykhailo Blozovskyi (1935–1941)
- Toma Baryliak (1940–[1944], employee)
- Oleksii Baziuk (1941–1944+)

== Gallery ==
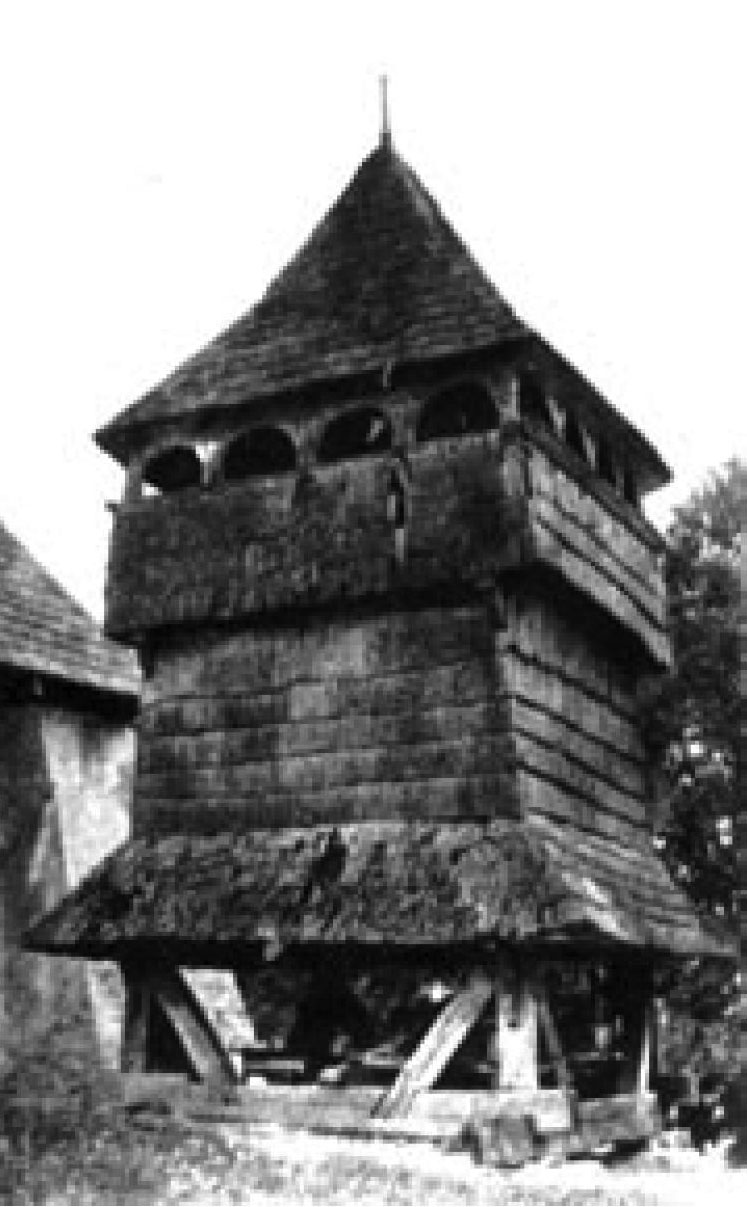
The wooden bell tower of the Chesnyky Church from the 18th century. Photo from the early 20th century.

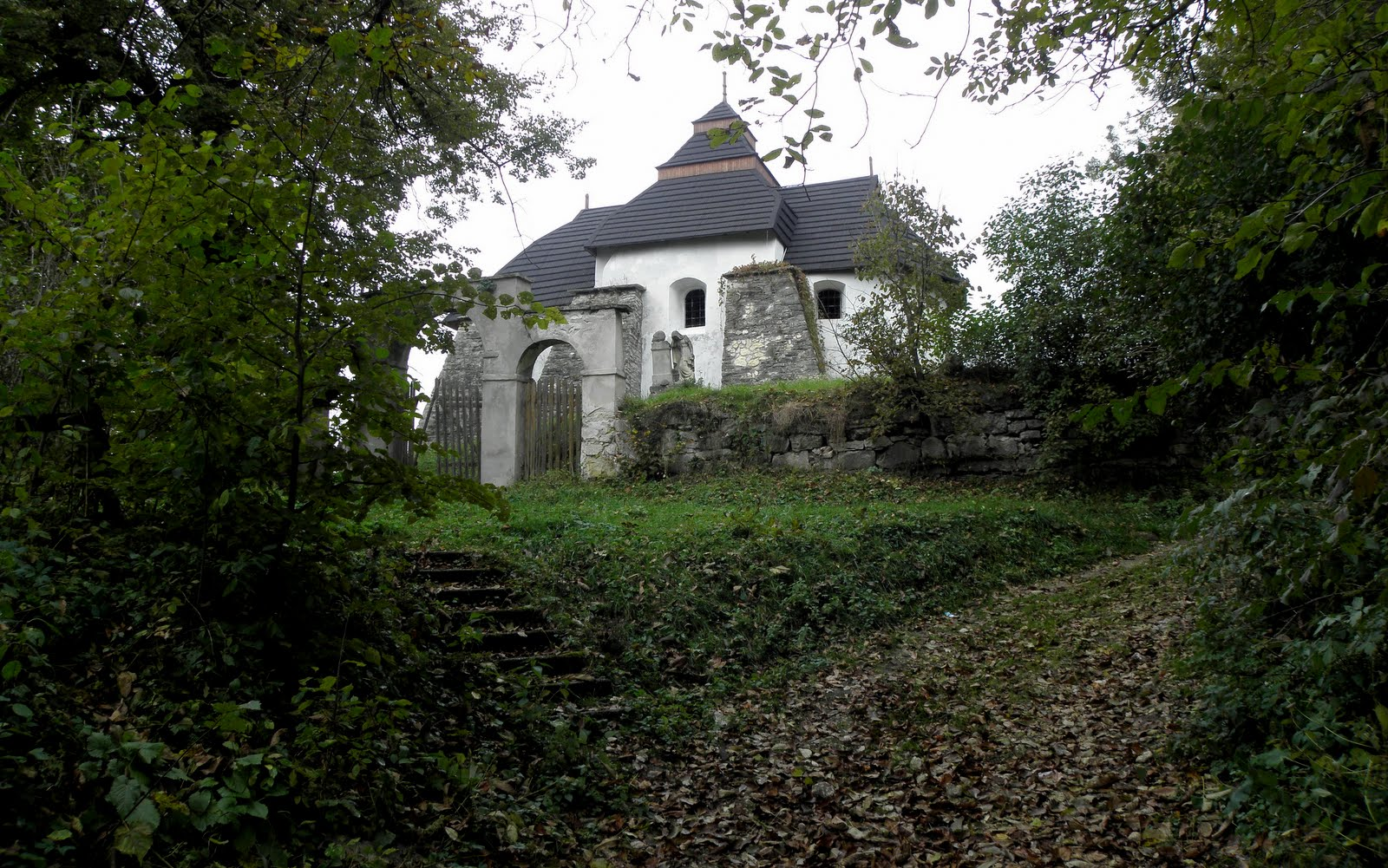
General view of the Chesnyky church

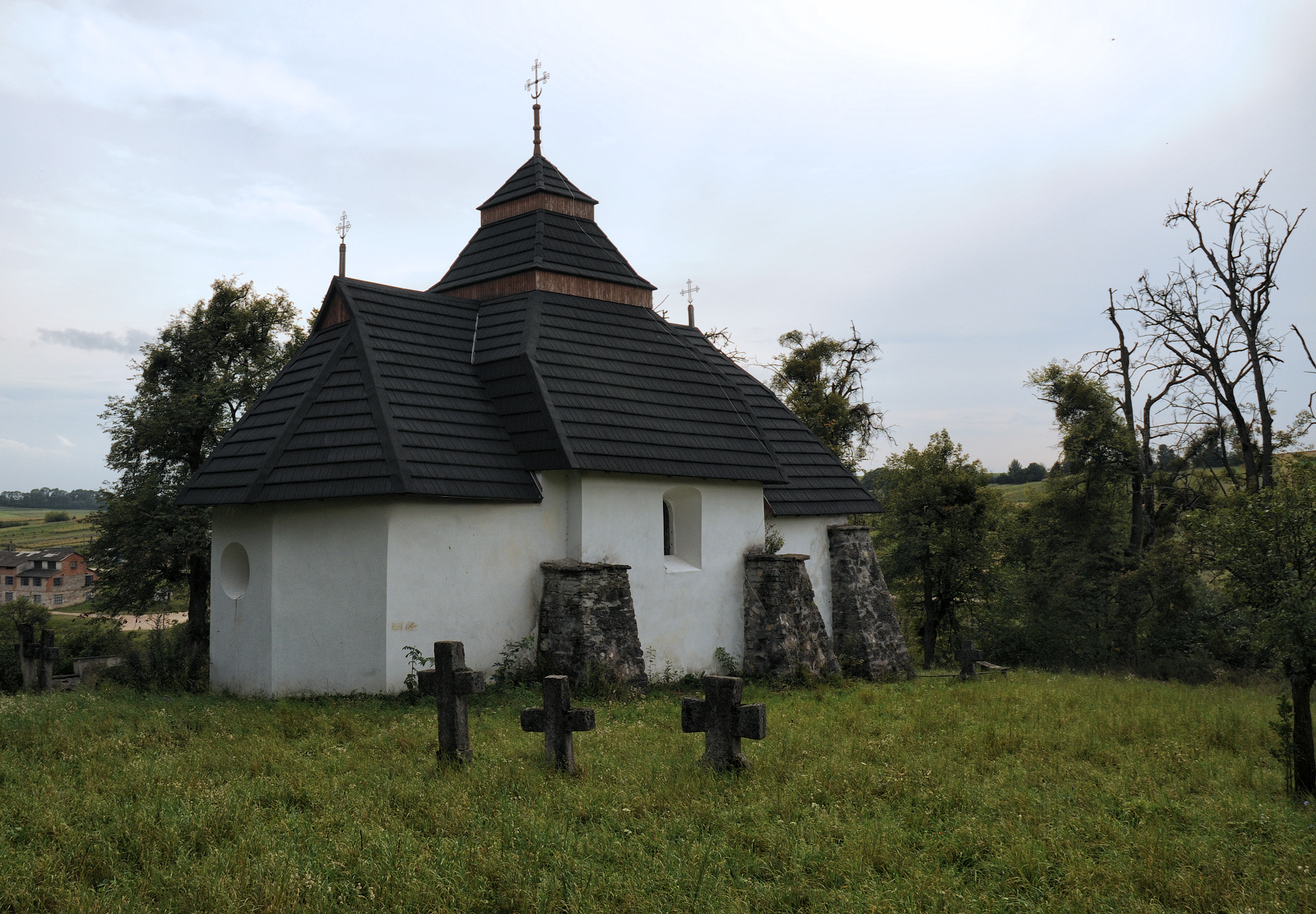
General view of the Chesnyky church

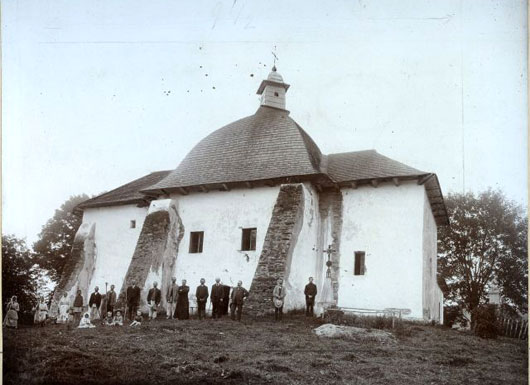
Saint Nicholas Church, Ulucz. Dismantled by the Austrians at the beginning of the 20th century

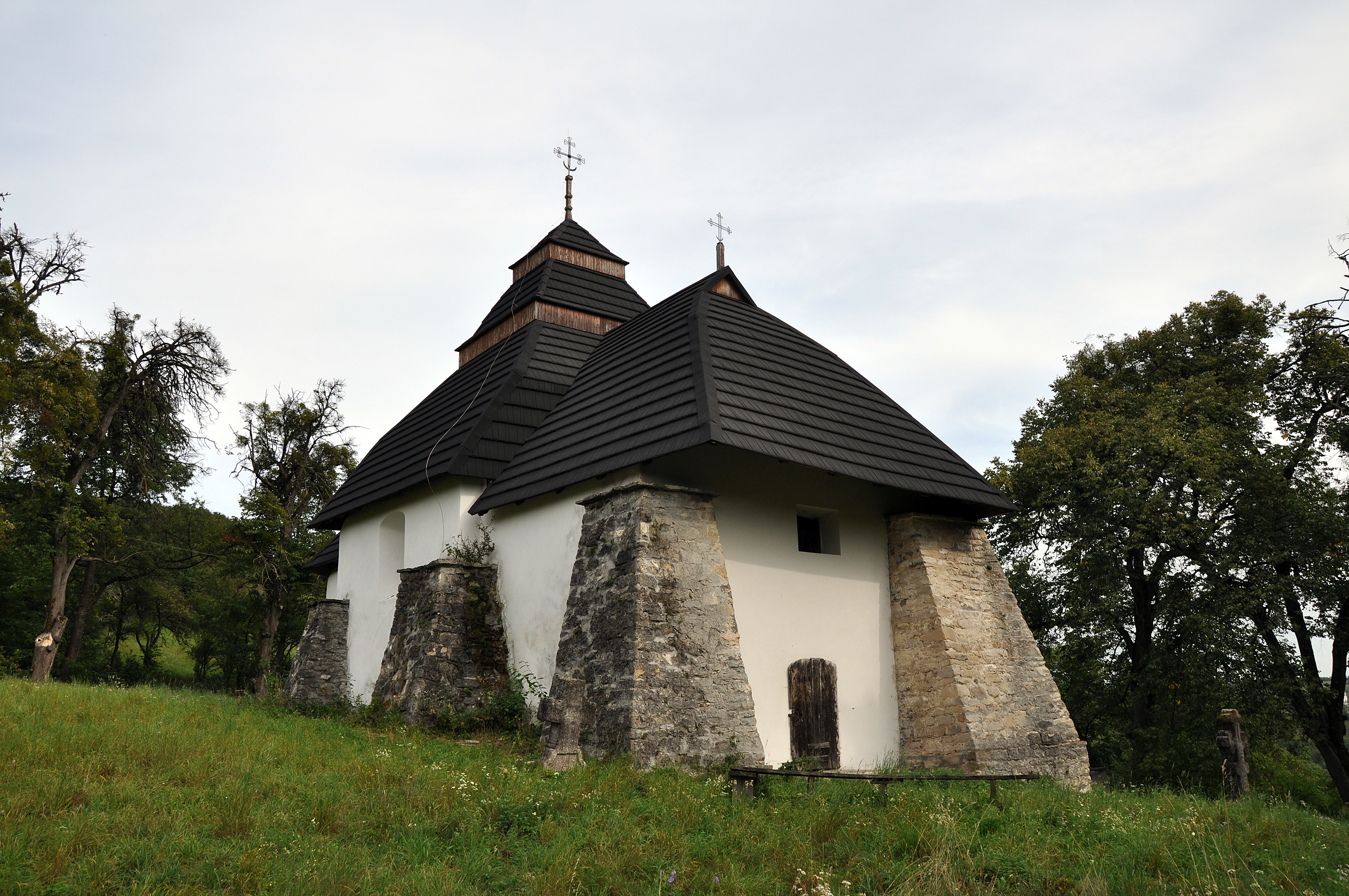
View of the church from the northwest side

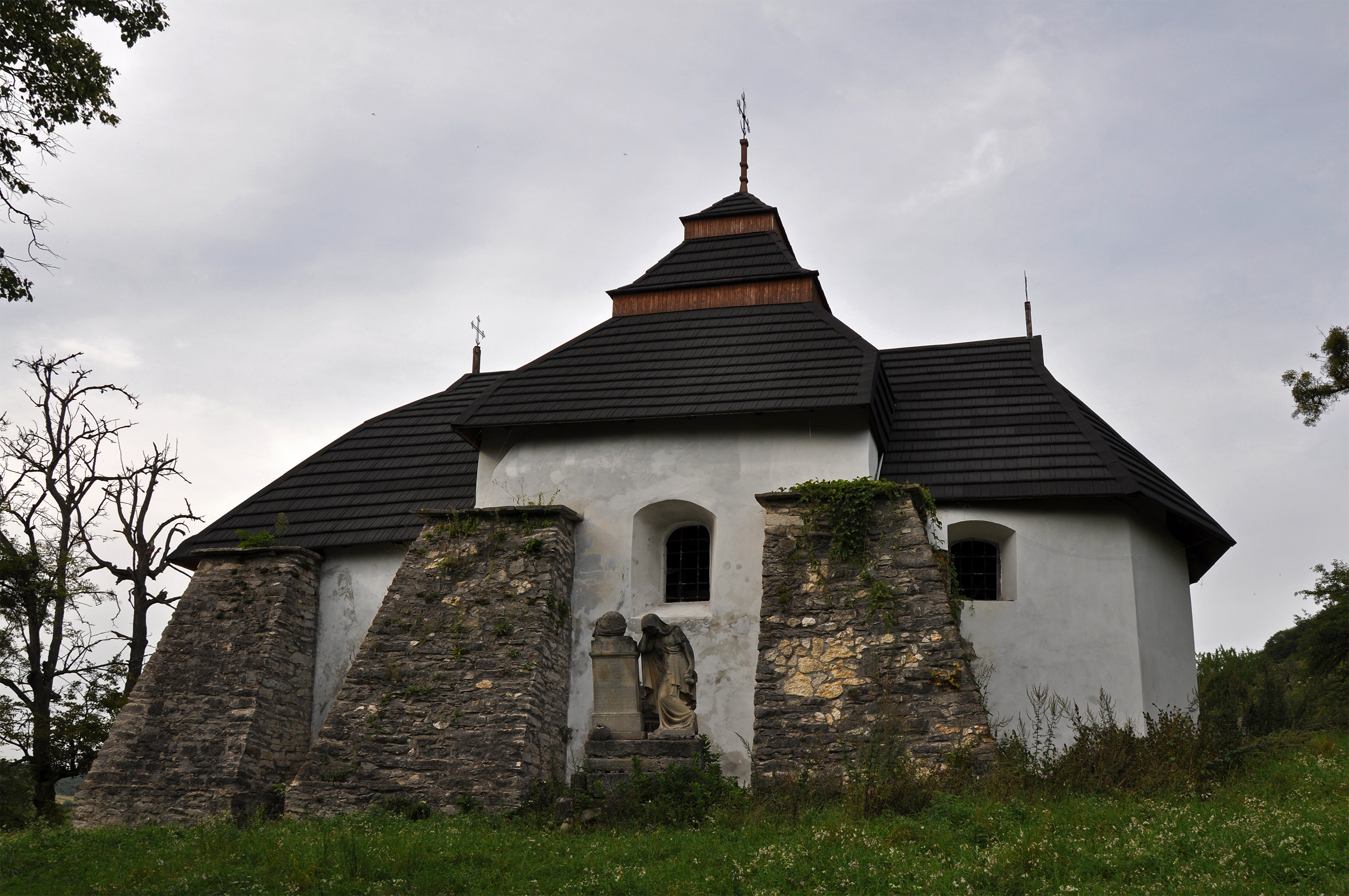
View of the church from the south side

== Bibliography ==
- Откович Т. Церква Святого Архангела Михаїла XIV-XVI ст. в селі Чесники // Бюлетень Львівського філіалу Національного науково-дослідного реставраційного центру України. — Львів, 2007. — № 1 (9). — С. 86-90.
