= Wołodź =

- Village
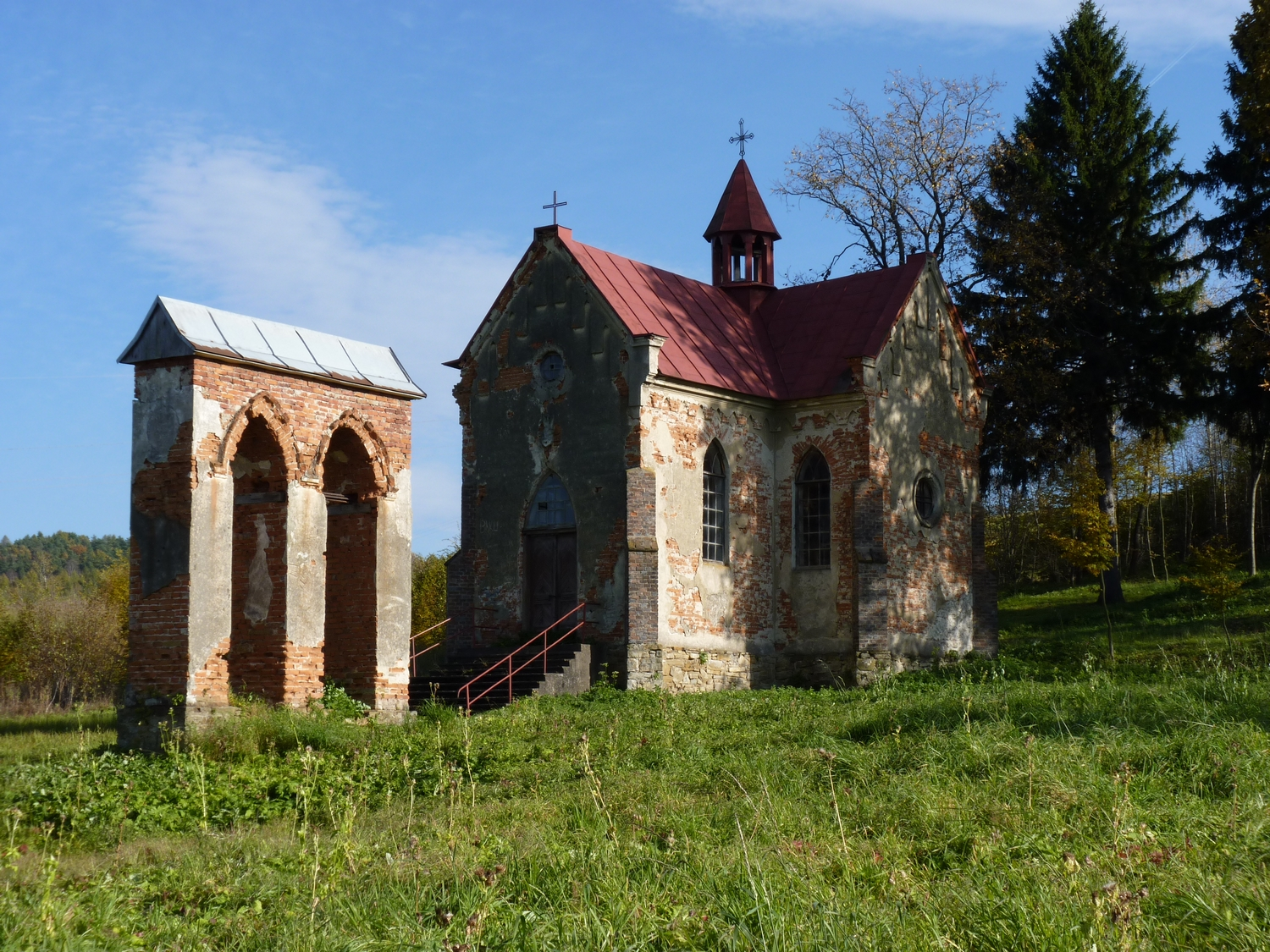
- Cemetery chapel

- Location within Poland
- Coordinates: 49°44′N 22°12′E
- Country: Poland
- Voivodeship: Subcarpathian
- County: Brzozów
- Gmina: Nozdrzec

Wołodź [ˈvɔwɔt͡ɕ] is a village in the administrative district of Gmina Nozdrzec, within Brzozów County, Subcarpathian Voivodeship, in south-eastern Poland.

It was first documented in 1373 as a Vlach settlement.
