= Jabłonka, Podkarpackie Voivodeship =

Jabłonka
- Village
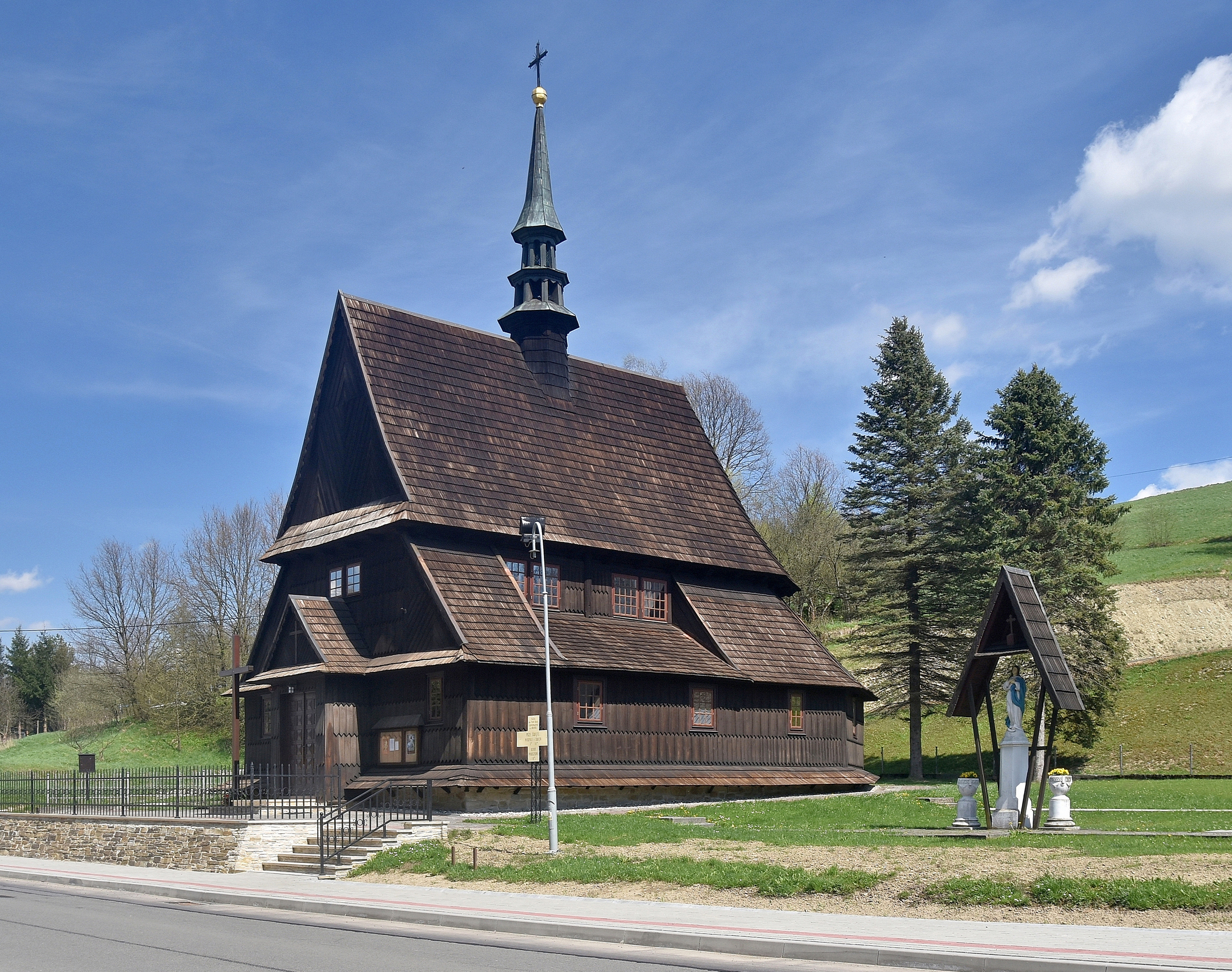
- Church of Our Lady of Częstochowa

- Location within Poland
- Coordinates: 49°41′37″N 22°6′53″E
- Country: Poland
- Voivodeship: Subcarpathian
- County: Brzozów
- Gmina: Dydnia
- Population: 1,100

Jabłonka [jaˈbwɔŋka] is a village in the administrative district of Gmina Dydnia, within Brzozów County, Subcarpathian Voivodeship, in south-eastern Poland.
