= Humniska =

- Village
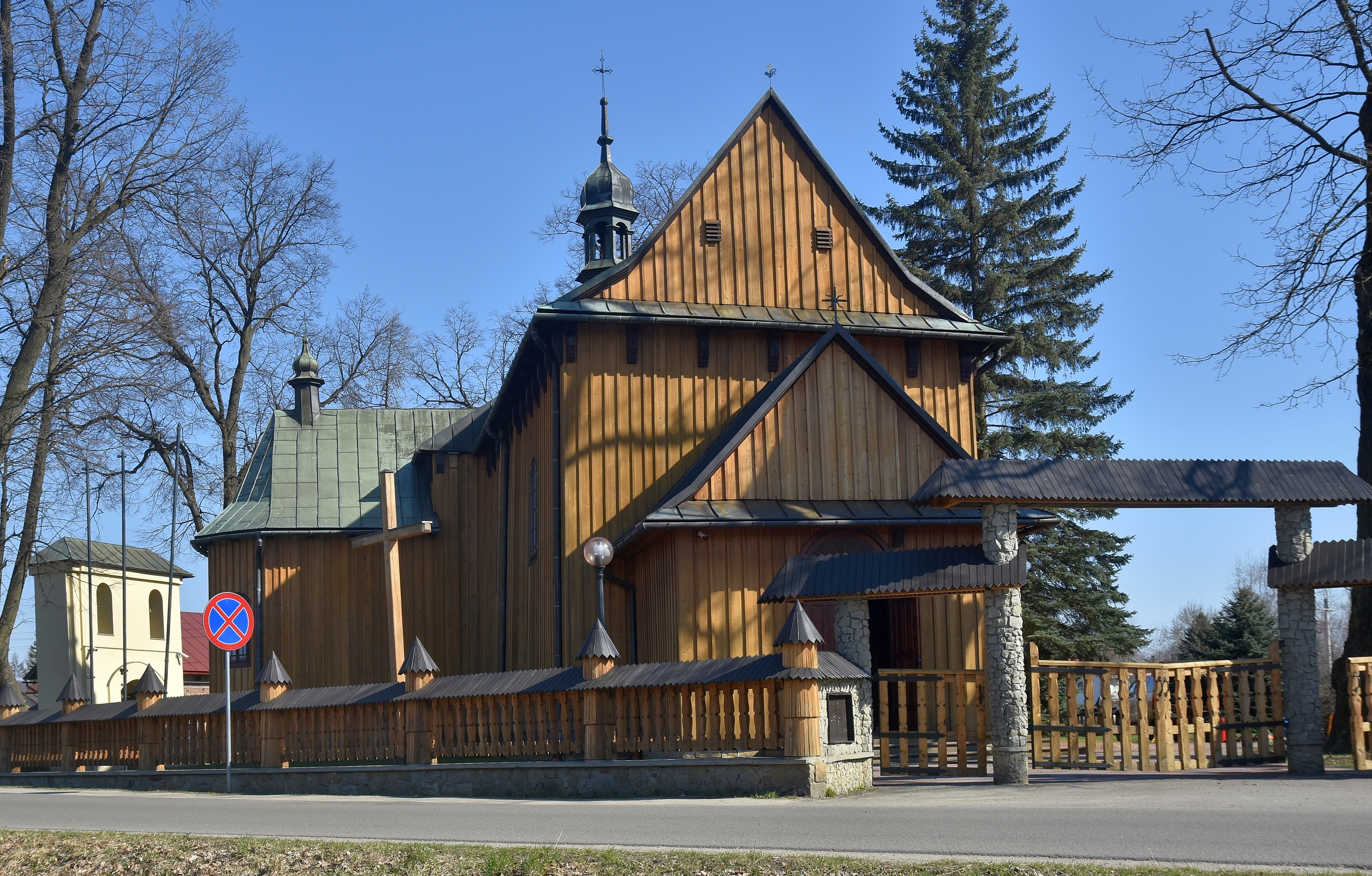
- Saint Stanislaus Church

- Location within Poland
- Coordinates: 49°40′N 22°4′E
- Country: Poland
- Voivodeship: Subcarpathian
- County: Brzozów
- Gmina: Brzozów

Population
  - Total: 4,300
- Time zone: UTC+1 (CET)
  - Summer (DST): UTC+2 (CEST)
- Vehicle registration: RBR

Humniska [xumˈɲiska] is a village in the administrative district of Gmina Brzozów, within Brzozów County, Subcarpathian Voivodeship, in south-eastern Poland.

Five Polish citizens were murdered by Nazi Germany in the village during World War II.
