= Niewistka =

- Village
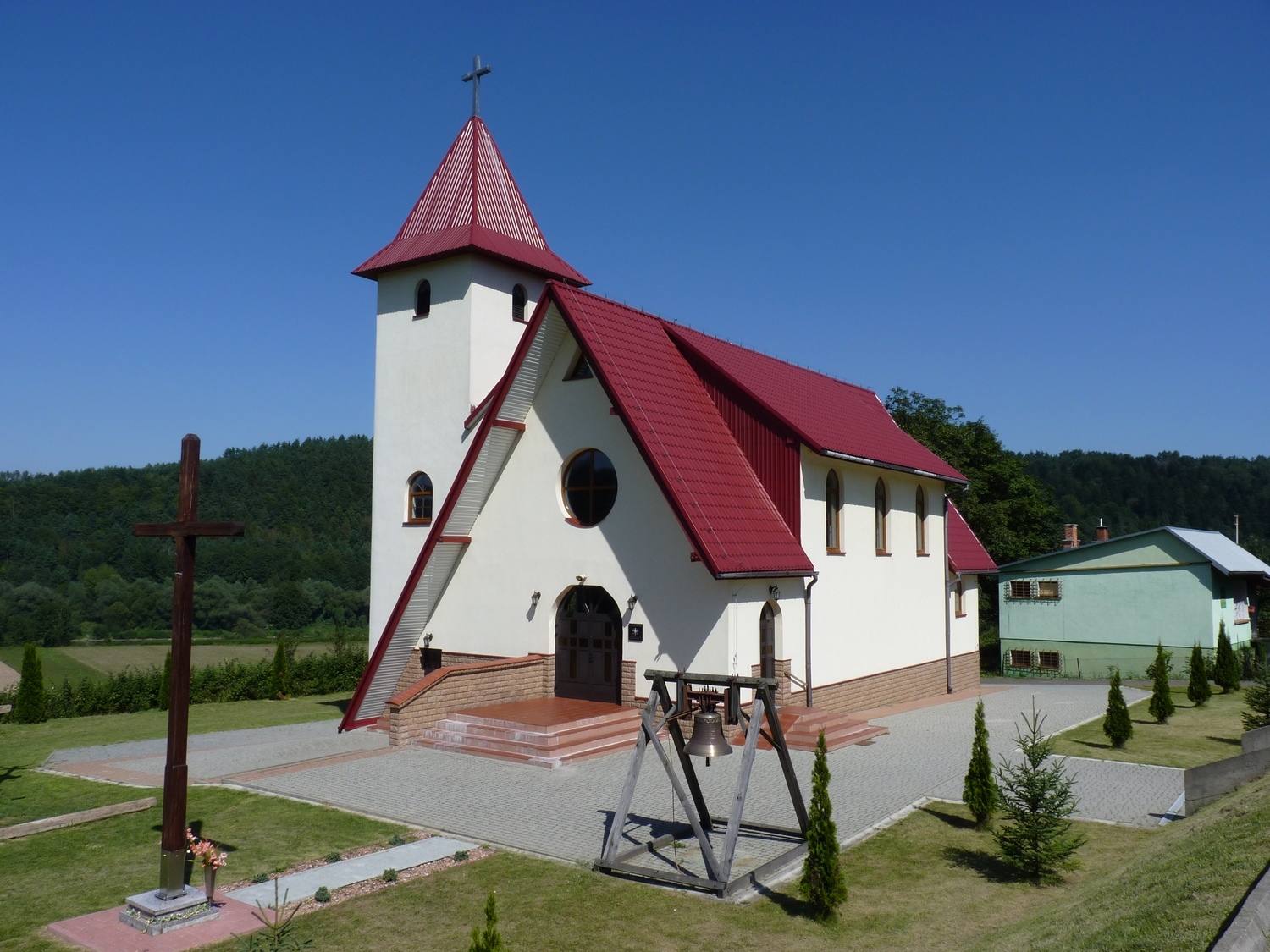
- Church of the Virgin Mary

- Location within Poland
- Coordinates: 49°43′44″N 22°12′56″E
- Country: Poland
- Voivodeship: Subcarpathian
- County: Brzozów
- Gmina: Dydnia
- Population: 340

Niewistka [ɲɛˈvʲistka] is a village in the administrative district of Gmina Dydnia, within Brzozów County, Subcarpathian Voivodeship, in south-eastern Poland.
