= Ujazdy, Brzozów County =

Ujazdy
- Village
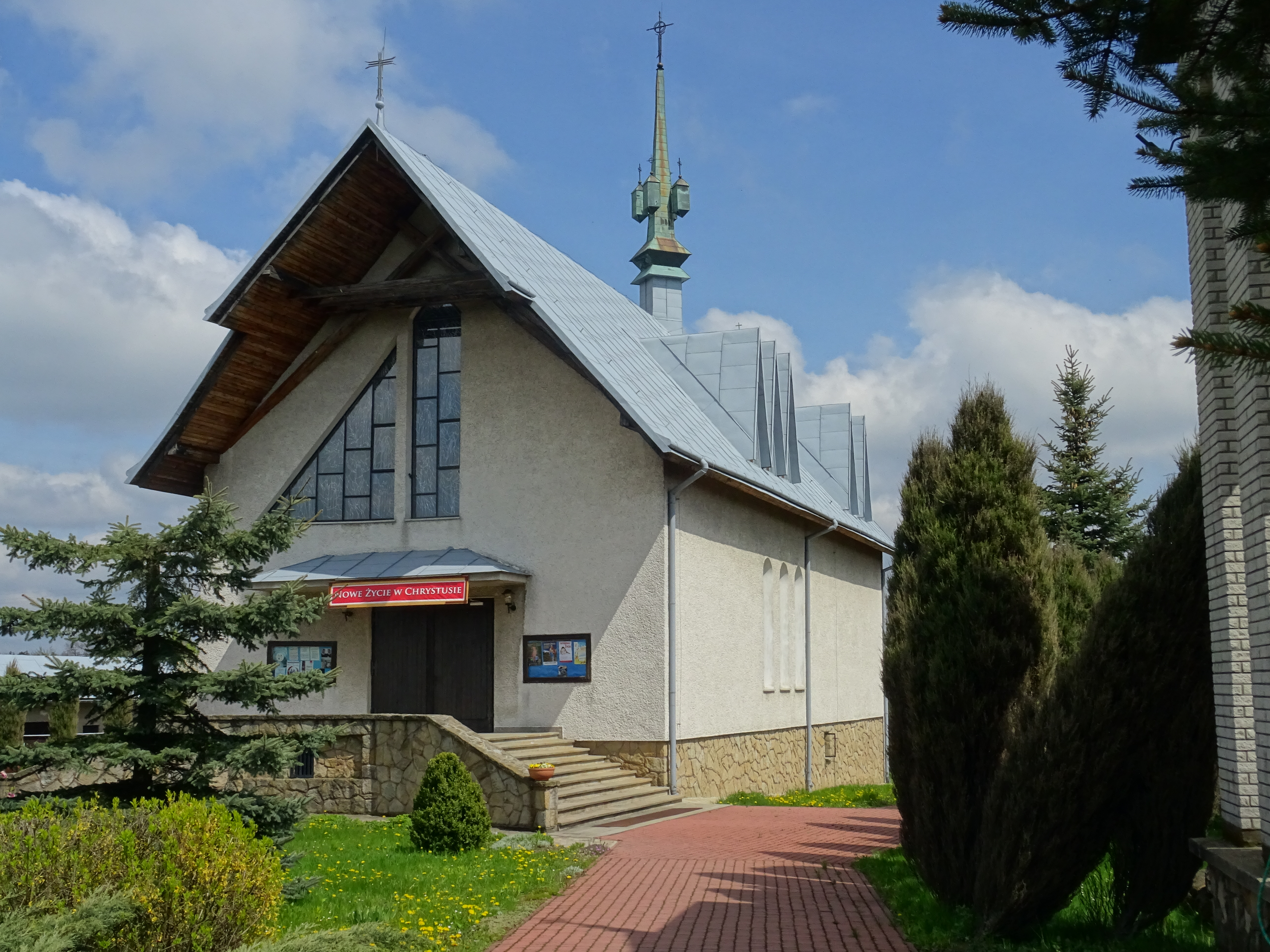

- Location within Poland
- Coordinates: 49°49′50″N 22°5′41″E
- Country: Poland
- Voivodeship: Subcarpathian
- County: Brzozów
- Gmina: Nozdrzec

Ujazdy [uˈjazdɨ] is a village in the administrative district of Gmina Nozdrzec, within Brzozów County, Subcarpathian Voivodeship, in south-eastern Poland.
