= Rudawiec, Podkarpackie Voivodeship =

Rudawiec
- Village
- Location within Poland
- Coordinates: 49°44′12″N 22°5′43″E
- Country: Poland
- Voivodeship: Subcarpathian
- County: Brzozów
- Gmina: Nozdrzec

Rudawiec [ruˈdavʲɛt͡s] is a village in the administrative district of Gmina Nozdrzec, within Brzozów County, Subcarpathian Voivodeship, in south-eastern Poland.
