= Wara, Poland =

Wara
- Village
- Location within Poland
- Coordinates: 49°46′N 22°13′E
- Country: Poland
- Voivodeship: Subcarpathian
- County: Brzozów
- Gmina: Nozdrzec

Wara [ˈvara] is a village in the administrative district of Gmina Nozdrzec, within Brzozów County, Subcarpathian Voivodeship, in south-eastern Poland.
