= Huta Poręby =

- Village
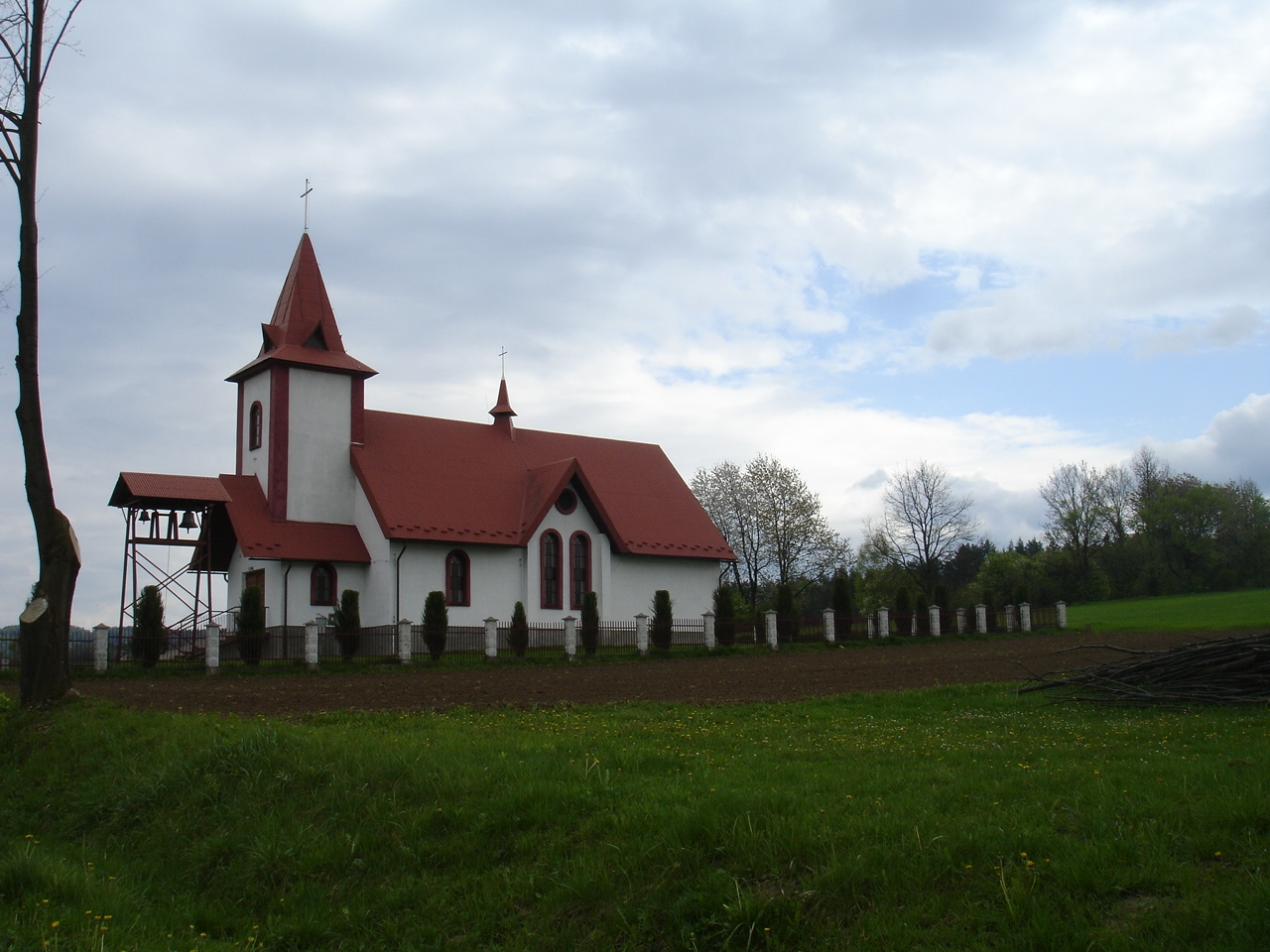
- Church in Huta Poręby

- Location within Poland
- Coordinates: 49°44′N 22°16′E
- Country: Poland
- Voivodeship: Subcarpathian
- County: Brzozów
- Gmina: Nozdrzec

Huta Poręby [ˈxuta pɔˈrɛmbɨ] is a village in the administrative district of Gmina Nozdrzec, within Brzozów County, Subcarpathian Voivodeship, in south-eastern Poland.
