= Witryłów =

- Village
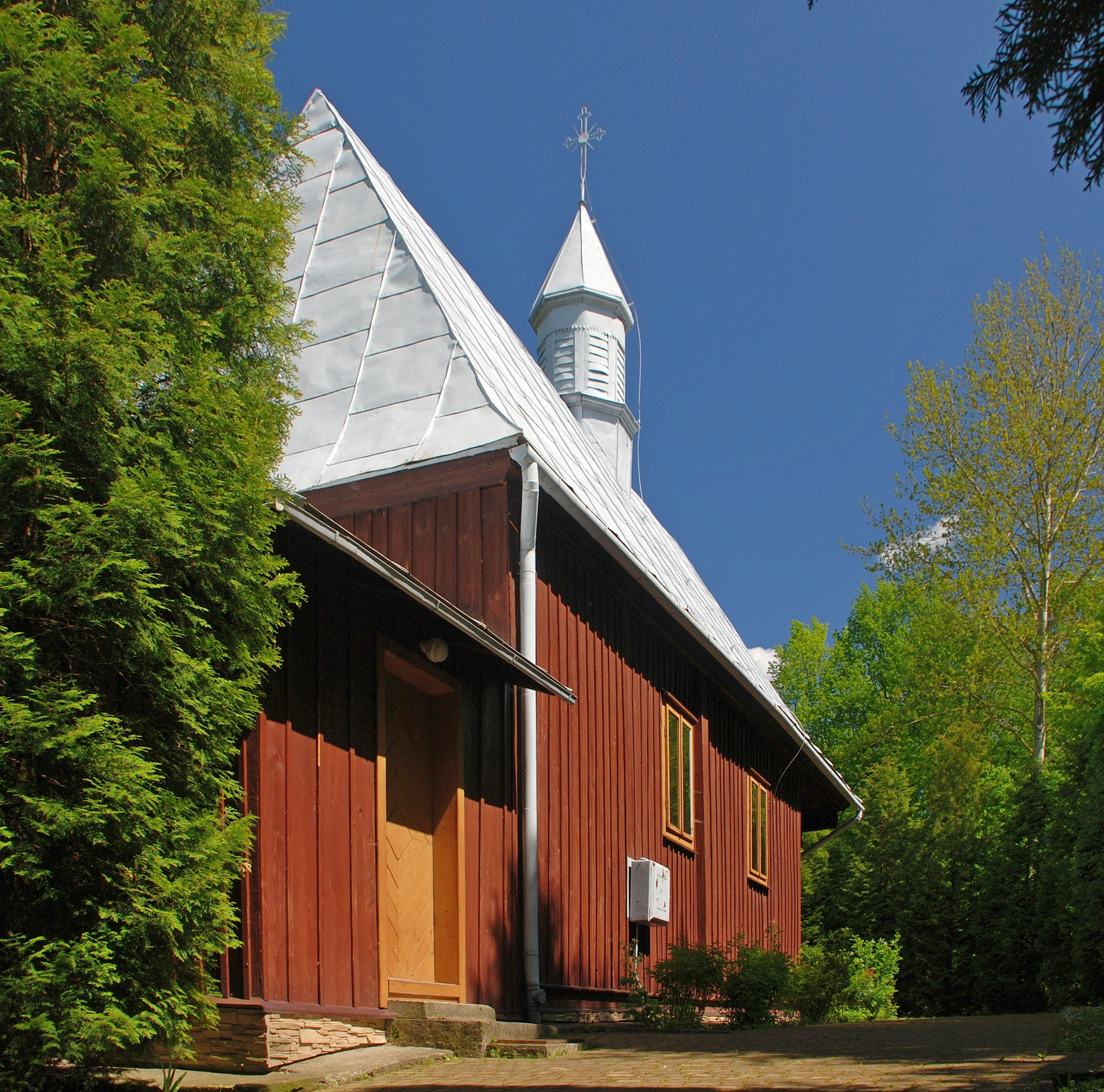
- Former Greek Catholic church of Saint Archangel Michael

- Location within Poland
- Coordinates: 49°40′N 22°14′E
- Country: Poland
- Voivodeship: Subcarpathian
- County: Brzozów
- Gmina: Dydnia

Witryłów [vʲiˈtrɨwuf] is a village in the administrative district of Gmina Dydnia, within Brzozów County, Subcarpathian Voivodeship, in south-eastern Poland.
