= Temeszów =

- Village
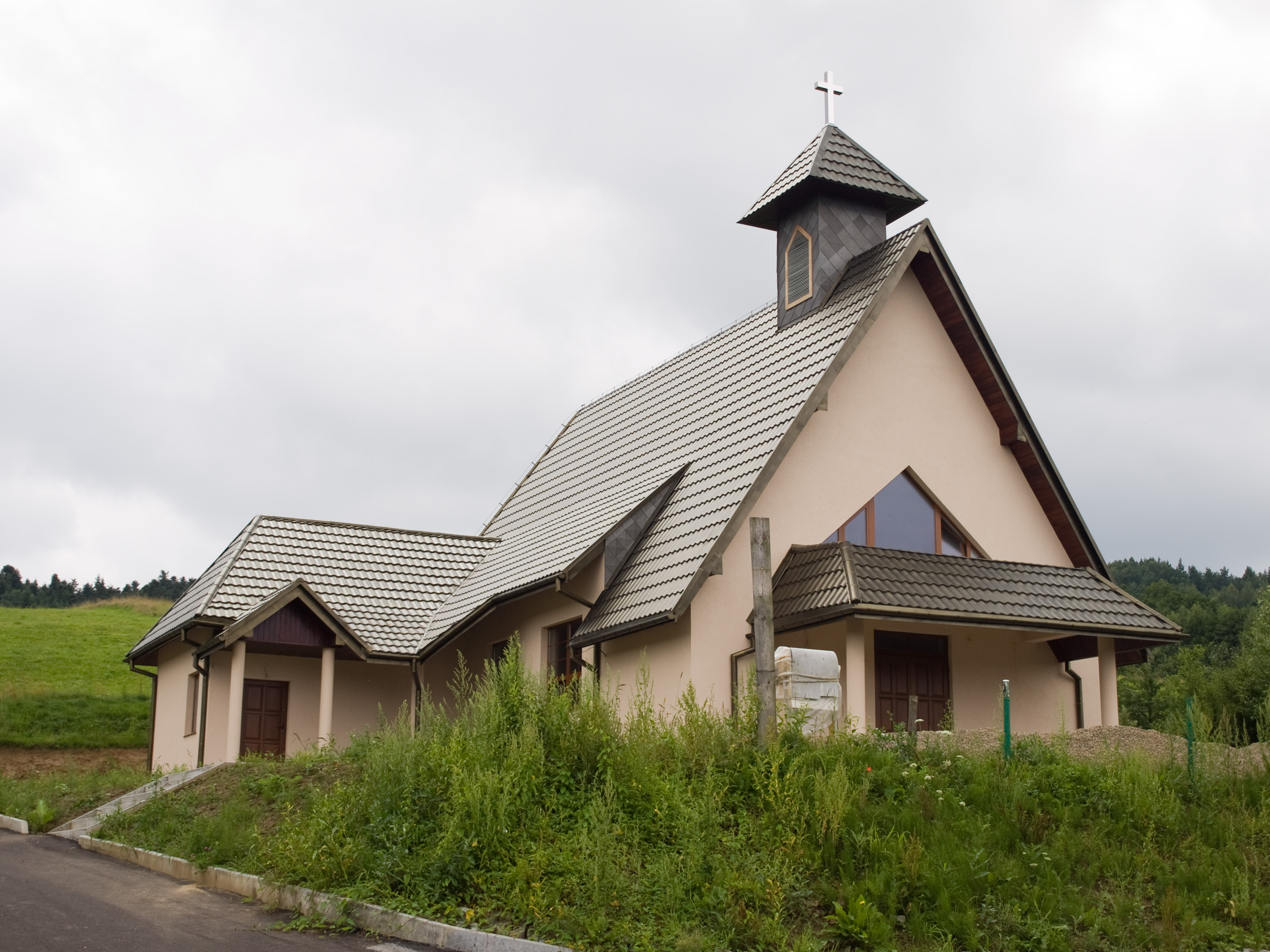
- Church of Our Lady of Ostra Brama

- Location within Poland
- Coordinates: 49°41′29″N 22°13′2″E
- Country: Poland
- Voivodeship: Subcarpathian
- County: Brzozów
- Gmina: Dydnia

Population
  - Total: 380
- Time zone: UTC+1 (CET)
  - Summer (DST): UTC+2 (CEST)
- Vehicle registration: RBR

Temeszów [tɛˈmɛʂuf] is a village in the administrative district of Gmina Dydnia, within Brzozów County, Subcarpathian Voivodeship, in south-eastern Poland.

Four Polish citizens were murdered by Nazi Germany in the village during World War II.
