= Ryta Górka =

- Village
- Location within Poland
- Coordinates: 49°49′24″N 22°3′41″E
- Country: Poland
- Voivodeship: Subcarpathian
- County: Brzozów
- Gmina: Nozdrzec

Ryta Górka [ˈrɨta ˈɡurka] is a village in the administrative district of Gmina Nozdrzec, within Brzozów County, Subcarpathian Voivodeship, in south-eastern Poland.
