= Końskie, Podkarpackie Voivodeship =

Końskie
- Village
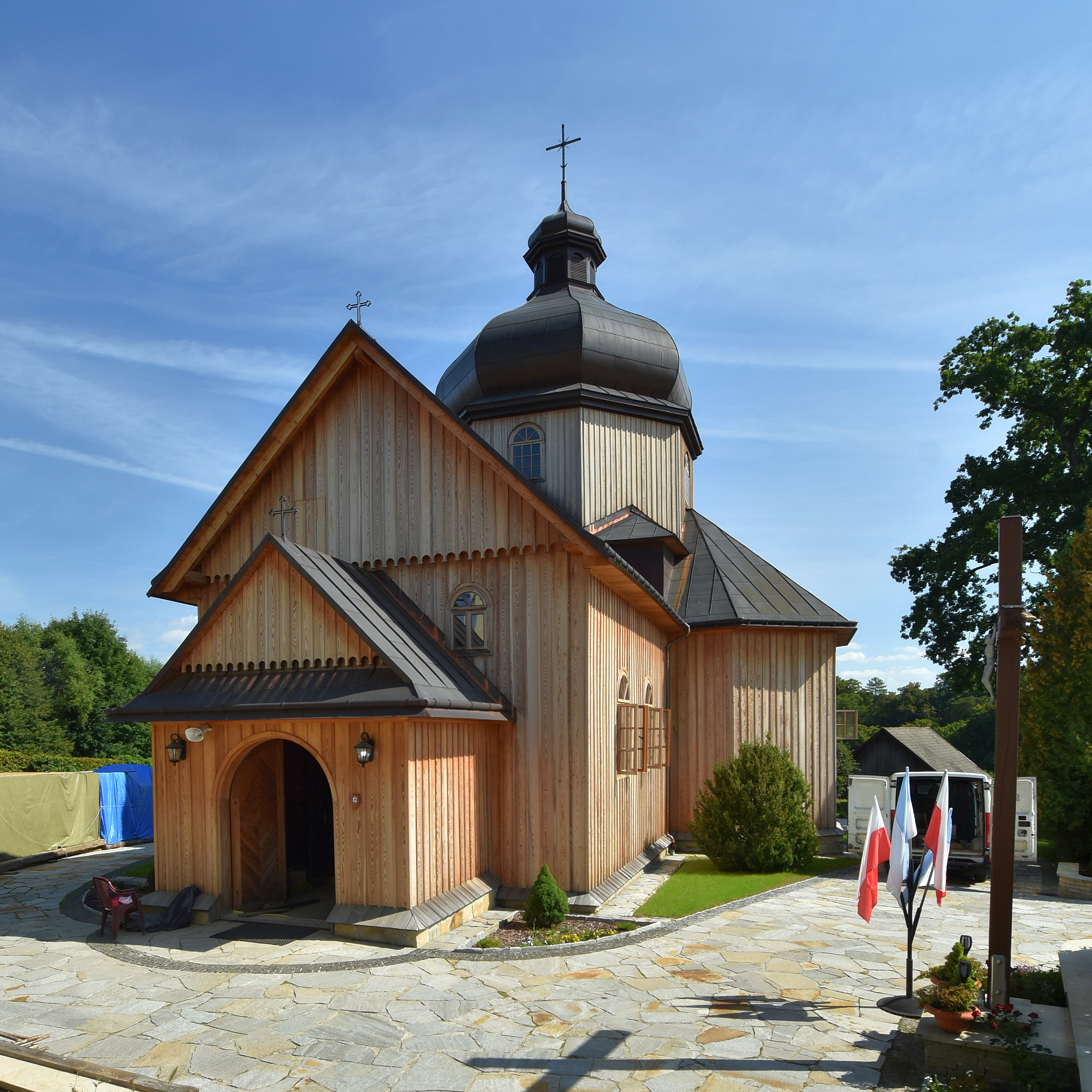
- Church of the Transfiguration in Końskie

- Location within Poland
- Coordinates: 49°39′N 22°14′E
- Country: Poland
- Voivodeship: Subcarpathian
- County: Brzozów
- Gmina: Dydnia
- Time zone: UTC+1 (CET)
  - Summer (DST): UTC+2 (CEST)
- Vehicle registration: RBR

Końskie [ˈkɔɲskʲɛ] is a village in the administrative district of Gmina Dydnia, within Brzozów County, Subcarpathian Voivodeship, in south-eastern Poland.
