= Wola Jasienicka =

- Village
- Location within Poland
- Coordinates: 49°45′12″N 21°53′6″E
- Country: Poland
- Voivodeship: Subcarpathian
- County: Brzozów
- Gmina: Jasienica Rosielna
- Population: 670

Wola Jasienicka [ˈvɔla jaɕɛˈɲit͡ska] is a village in the administrative district of Gmina Jasienica Rosielna, within Brzozów County, Subcarpathian Voivodeship, in south-eastern Poland.
