= Izdebki, Podkarpackie Voivodeship =

Izdebki
- Village
- Location within Poland
- Coordinates: 49°46′N 22°6′E
- Country: Poland
- Voivodeship: Subcarpathian
- County: Brzozów
- Gmina: Nozdrzec

Izdebki [izˈdɛpkʲi] is a village in the administrative district of Gmina Nozdrzec, within Brzozów County, Subcarpathian Voivodeship, in south-eastern Poland.
