= Wola Górecka =

- Village
- Location within Poland
- Coordinates: 49°37′42″N 22°03′42″E
- Country: Poland
- Voivodeship: Podkarpackie
- County: Brzozów
- Gmina: Brzozów

Wola Górecka [ˈvɔla ɡuˈrɛt͡ska] is a village in the administrative district of Gmina Brzozów, within Brzozów County, Podkarpackie Voivodeship, in south-eastern Poland.
