= Czarnorzeki-Strzyżów Landscape Park =

Protected area in Poland

Coordinates: 49.8192°N 21.7089°E

- Czarnorzecko-Strzyżowski Park Krajobrazowy
- IUCN category V (protected landscape/seascape)
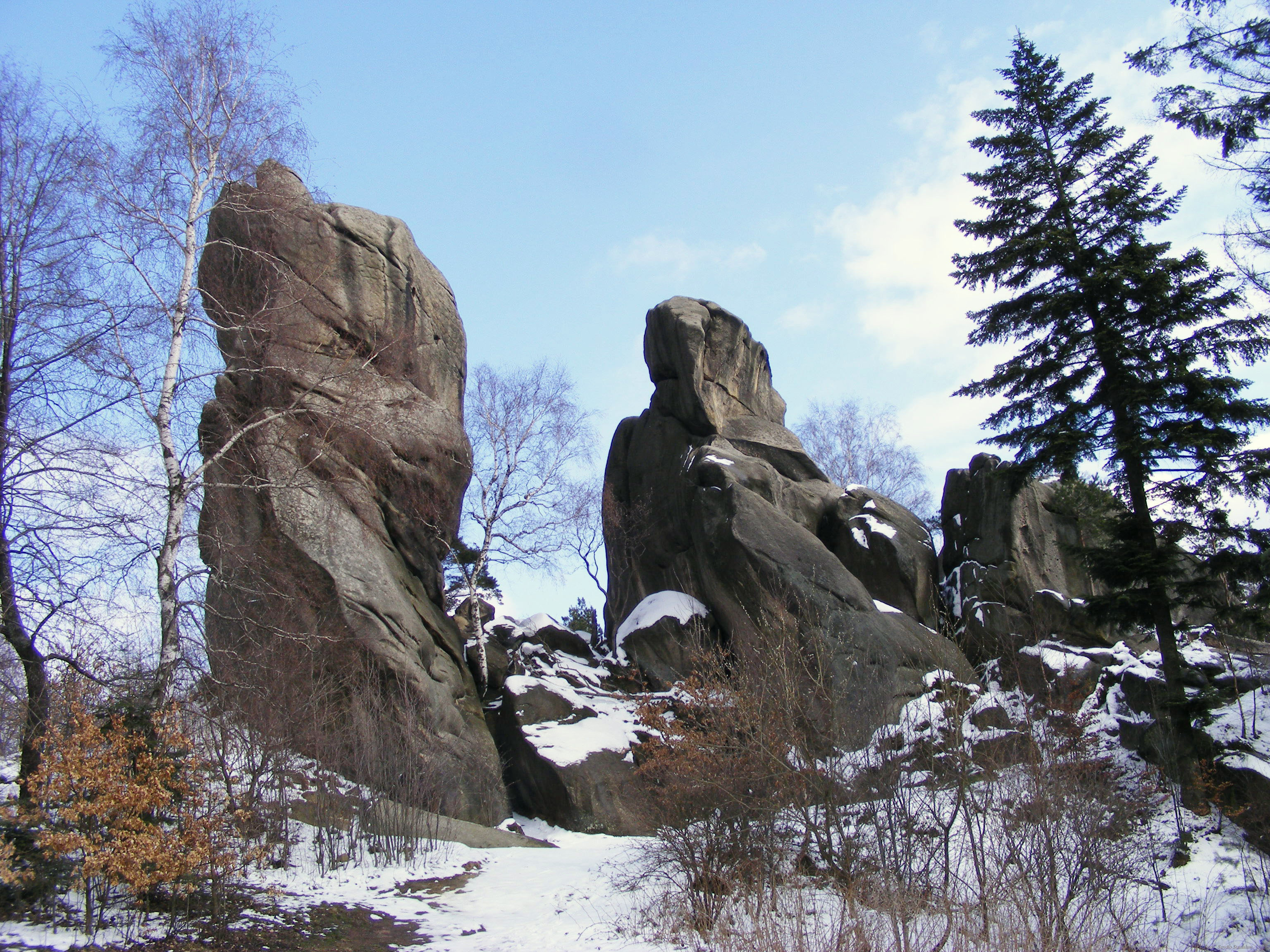
- Rocks
- Interactive map of Czarnorzeki-Strzyżów Landscape Park
- Location: Podkarpackie Voivodeship
- Area: 257.84 km^{2} (99.55 sq mi)
- Established: 1993

Czarnorzeki-Strzyżów Landscape Park (Czarnorzecko-Strzyżowski Park Krajobrazowy) is a protected area (Landscape Park) in south-eastern Poland, established in 1993, covering an area of 257.84 square kilometres (99.55 sq mi).

The Park lies within Podkarpackie Voivodeship: in Brzozów County (Gmina Jasienica Rosielna), Dębica County (Gmina Brzostek), Krosno County (Gmina Korczyna, Gmina Wojaszówka) and Strzyżów County (Gmina Strzyżów, Gmina Frysztak, Gmina Wiśniowa).
