= Grabówka, Podkarpackie Voivodeship =

Grabówka
- Village
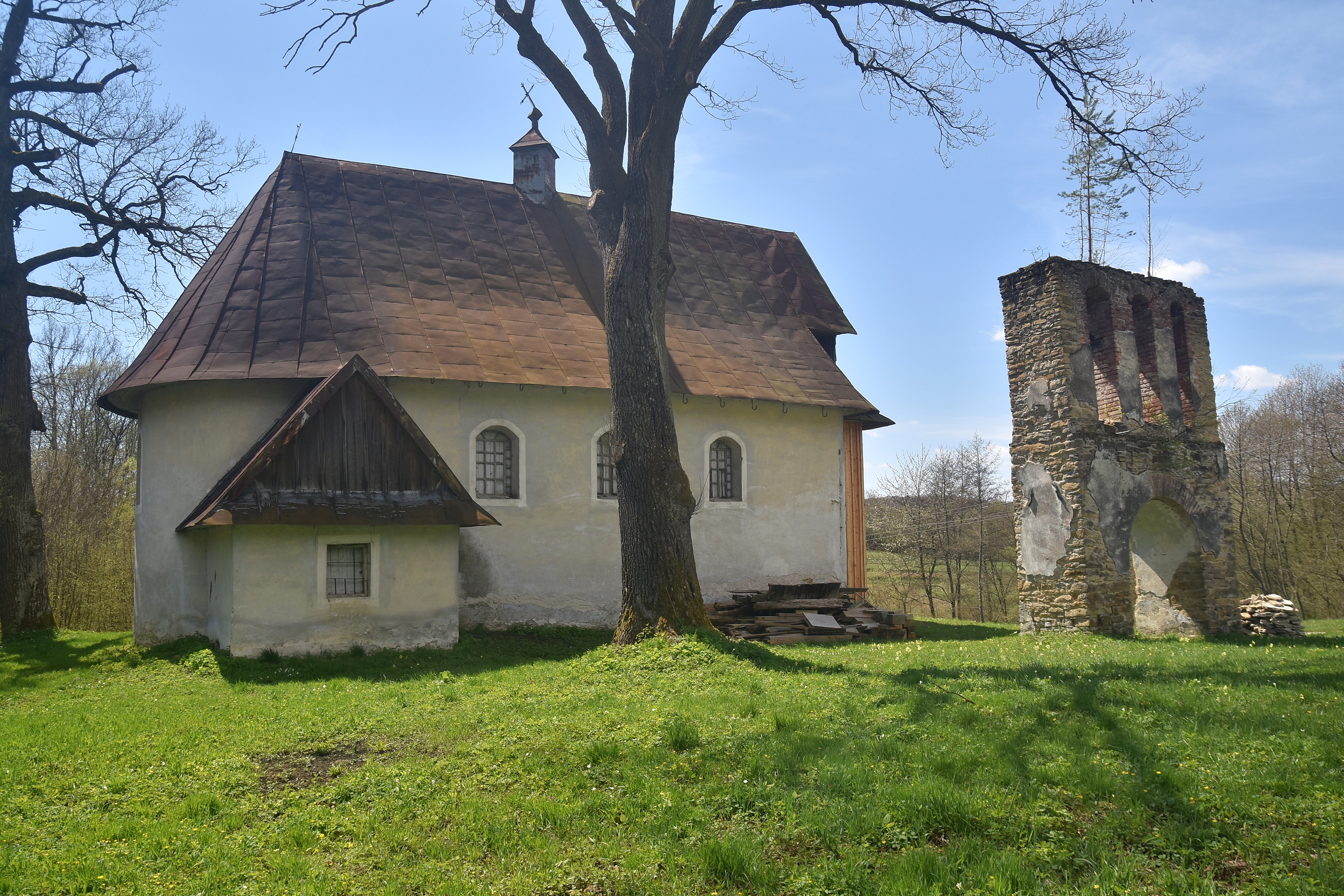
- Former Greek Catholic church of Saint Nicholas

- Location within Poland
- Coordinates: 49°40′N 22°9′E
- Country: Poland
- Voivodeship: Subcarpathian
- County: Brzozów
- Gmina: Dydnia

Grabówka [ɡraˈbufka] (is a village in the administrative district of Gmina Dydnia, within Brzozów County, Subcarpathian Voivodeship, in south-eastern Poland.
