= Siedliska, Brzozów County =

Siedliska
- Village
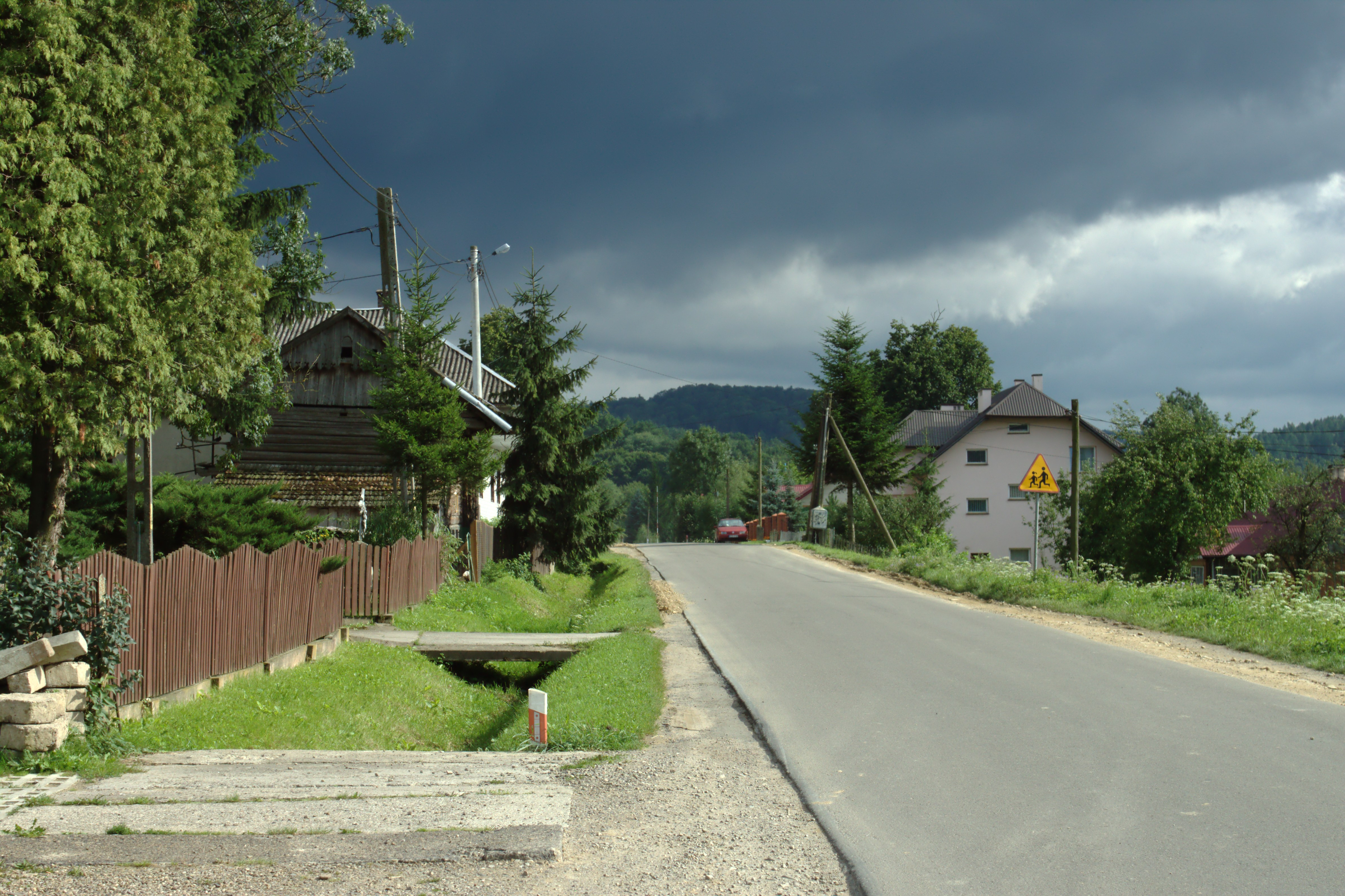
- Main road through the village

- Location within Poland
- Coordinates: 49°45′26″N 22°14′18″E
- Country: Poland
- Voivodeship: Subcarpathian
- County: Brzozów
- Gmina: Nozdrzec

Siedliska [ɕɛdˈlʲiska] is a village in the administrative district of Gmina Nozdrzec, within Brzozów County, Subcarpathian Voivodeship, in south-eastern Poland.
