= Górki, Brzozów County =

Górki
- Village
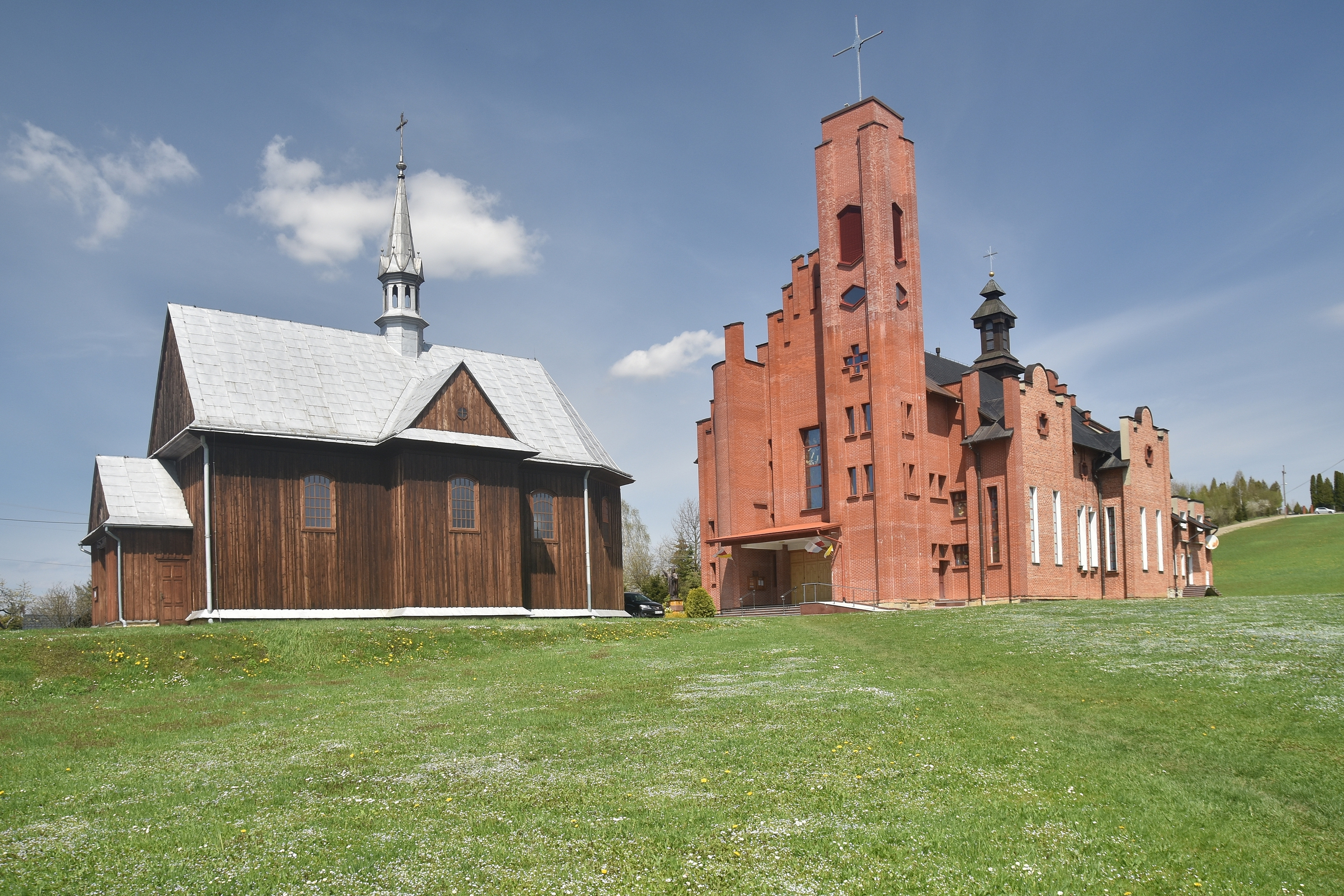
- Old and new church in Górki

- Location within Poland
- Coordinates: 49°38′50″N 22°2′27″E
- Country: Poland
- Voivodeship: Subcarpathian
- County: Brzozów
- Gmina: Brzozów

Population
  - Total: 1,800

Górki [ˈɡurki] is a village in the administrative district of Gmina Brzozów, within Brzozów County, Subcarpathian Voivodeship, in south-eastern Poland.
