= Wydrna =

- Village
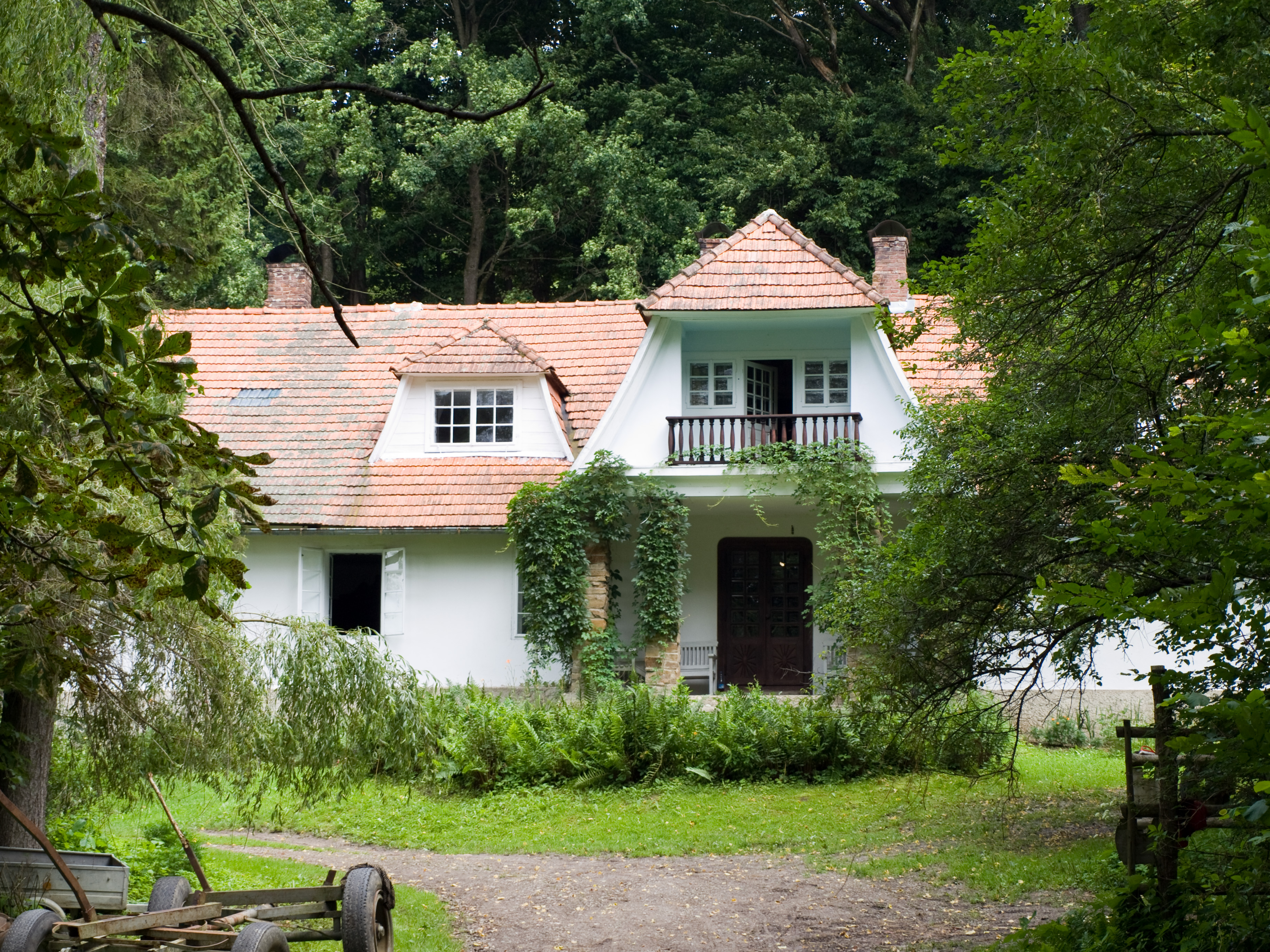
- Manor house

- Location within Poland
- Coordinates: 49°44′N 22°8′E
- Country: Poland
- Voivodeship: Subcarpathian
- County: Brzozów
- Gmina: Dydnia
- Time zone: UTC+1 (CET)
  - Summer (DST): UTC+2 (CEST)

Wydrna [ˈvɨdrna] is a village in the administrative district of Gmina Dydnia, within Brzozów County, Subcarpathian Voivodeship, in south-eastern Poland.

Five Polish citizens were murdered by Nazi Germany in the village during World War II.
