= Zbigniew Rychlicki =

Polish graphic artist and illustrator (1922–1989)

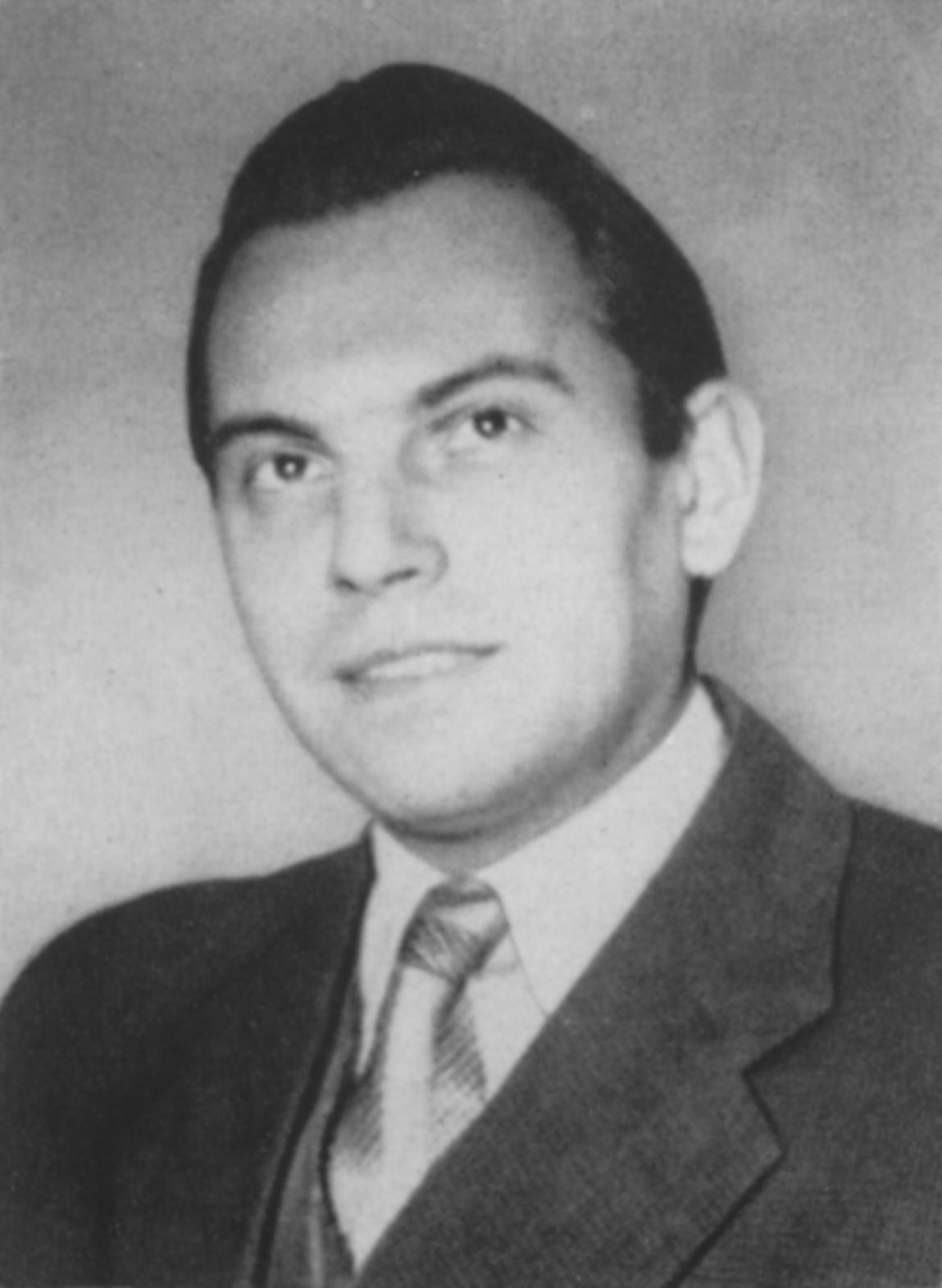
- Rychlicki before 1965
- Born: 17 January 1922; Orzechówka
- Died: 10 September 1989 (aged 67); Bratislava, Czechoslovakia
- Resting place: Powązki Military Cemetery
- Occupations: Graphic artist, illustrator

Zbigniew Rychlicki (17 January 1922 – 10 September 1989) was a Polish graphic artist, and illustrator of children's books. He received the Hans Christian Andersen Awards Prize given by the Jury of the International Board on Books for Young People (IBBY) for outstanding artistic achievement. He was given the 1954 Prime Minister's Award for his works for children and youth.

== Life and education ==
Rychlicki was born on 17 January 1922 in Orzechówka. He studied and then graduated from the Institute in 1946. During the years 1947 to 1948 he worked at the Animated Film Studio in Łódź. He also studied at the Academy for Fine Arts in Kraków in 1956.

He died on 10 September 1989 in Bratislava, Czechoslovakia.

== Career ==
Rychlicki was in charge of the graphic part of the magazine "Teddy Bear." In 1949 he moved to Warsaw, and acted as the director of the Publishing Institute "Our Bookstore" ("Nasza Księgarnia"). He authored the illustrations of several children's books, including From things into things by Wanda Chotomska, Please elephant by Ludwik Jerzy Kern, Plastusiowy diary of Mary Kownacka, Gulliver's Travels by Jonathan Swift. and Mysterious Island by Jules Verne.
