= Wola Wołodzka =

- Village
- Location within Poland
- Coordinates: 49°43′09″N 22°14′39″E
- Country: Poland
- Voivodeship: Podkarpackie
- County: Brzozów
- Gmina: Nozdrzec

Wola Wołodzka [ˈvɔla vɔˈwɔt͡ska] is a village in the administrative district of Gmina Nozdrzec, within Brzozów County, Podkarpackie Voivodeship, in south-eastern Poland.
