= Krzemienna, Podkarpackie Voivodeship =

Krzemienna
- Village
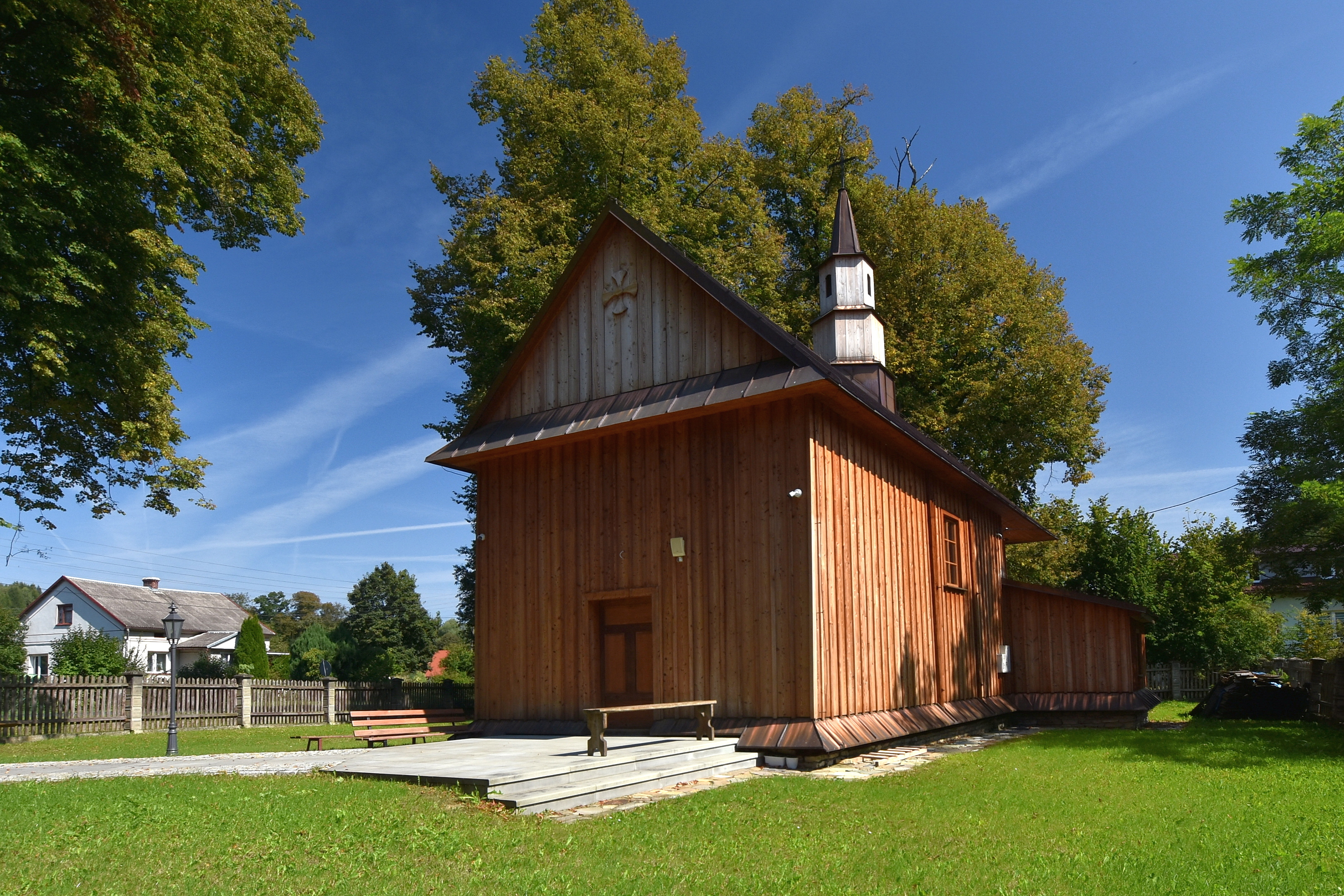
- Former Greek Catholic church

- Location within Poland
- Coordinates: 49°42′N 22°12′E
- Country: Poland
- Voivodeship: Subcarpathian
- County: Brzozów
- Gmina: Dydnia

Krzemienna [kʂɛˈmʲɛnːa] is a village in the administrative district of Gmina Dydnia, within Brzozów County, Subcarpathian Voivodeship, in south-eastern Poland.
