= Niebocko =

- Village
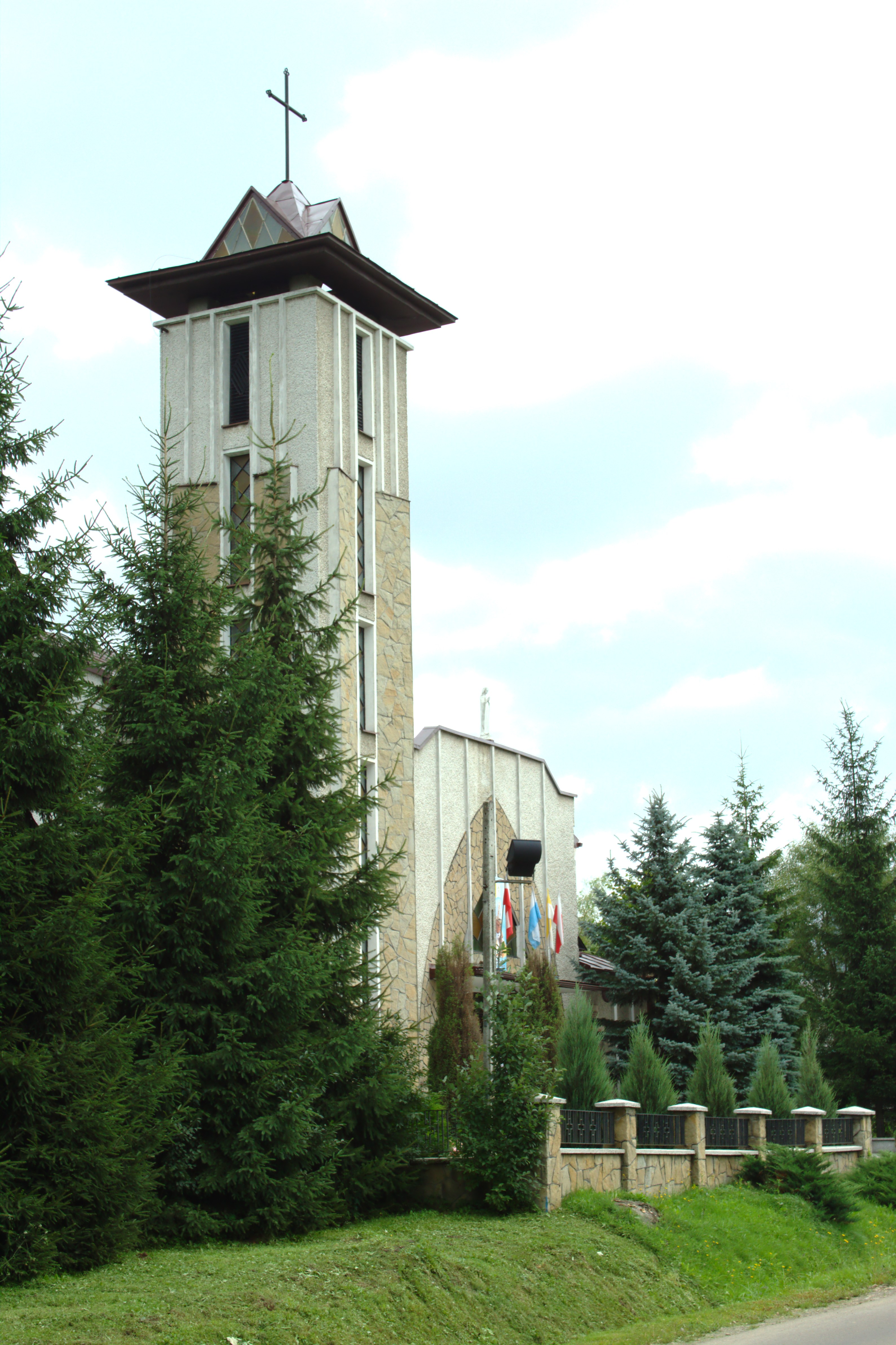
- Church of Saint John Cantius

- Location within Poland
- Coordinates: 49°41′N 22°7′E
- Country: Poland
- Voivodeship: Subcarpathian
- County: Brzozów
- Gmina: Dydnia

Niebocko [ɲɛˈbɔt͡skɔ] is a village in the administrative district of Gmina Dydnia, within Brzozów County, Subcarpathian Voivodeship, in south-eastern Poland.
