= Obarzym =

- Village
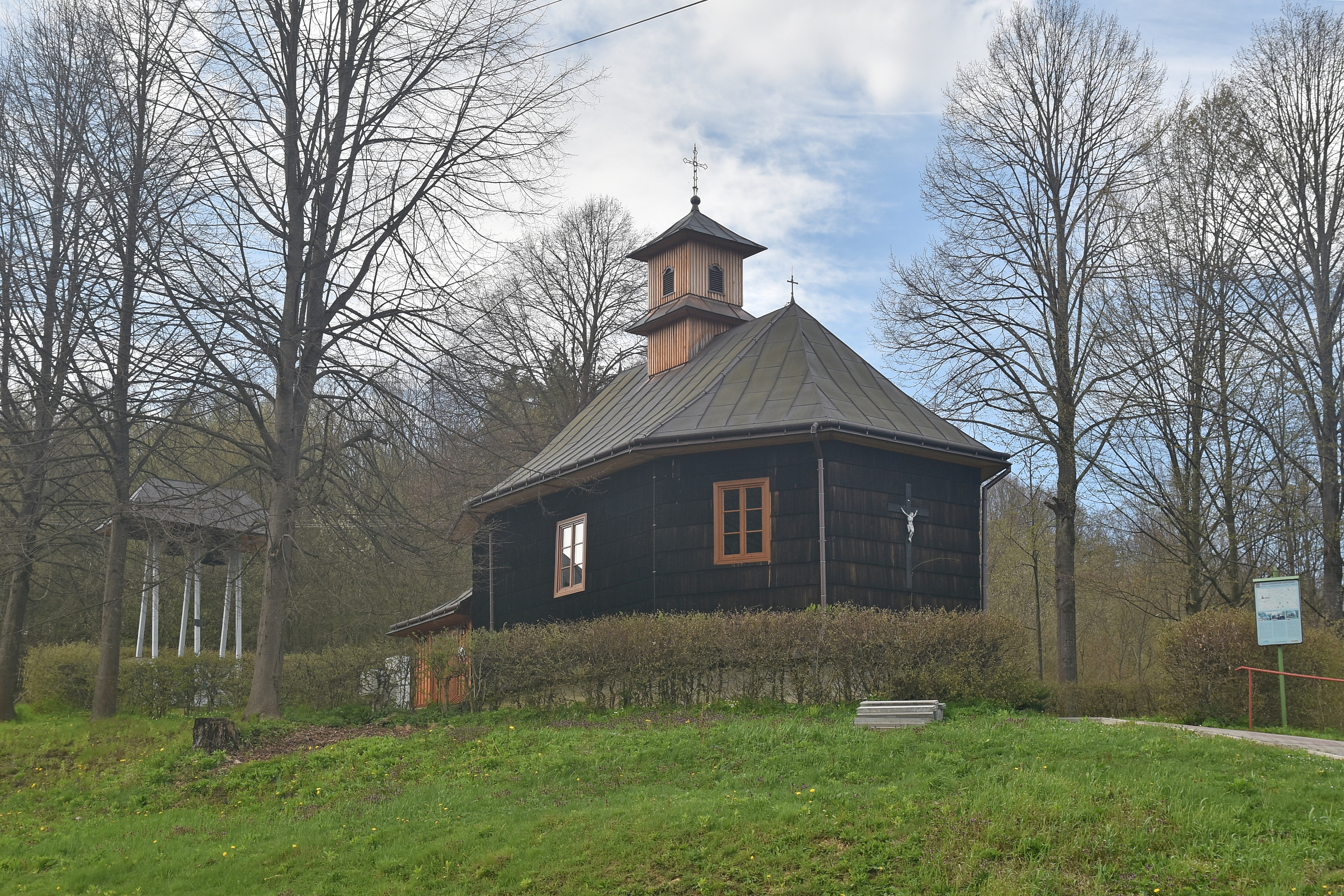
- Former Greek Catholic church of the Ascension

- Location within Poland
- Coordinates: 49°43′N 22°10′E
- Country: Poland
- Voivodeship: Subcarpathian
- County: Brzozów
- Gmina: Dydnia

Obarzym [ɔˈbaʐɨm] is a village in Gmina Dydnia, within Brzozów County, Subcarpathian Voivodeship, in south-eastern Poland.
