= Jasienica Rosielna =

- Village
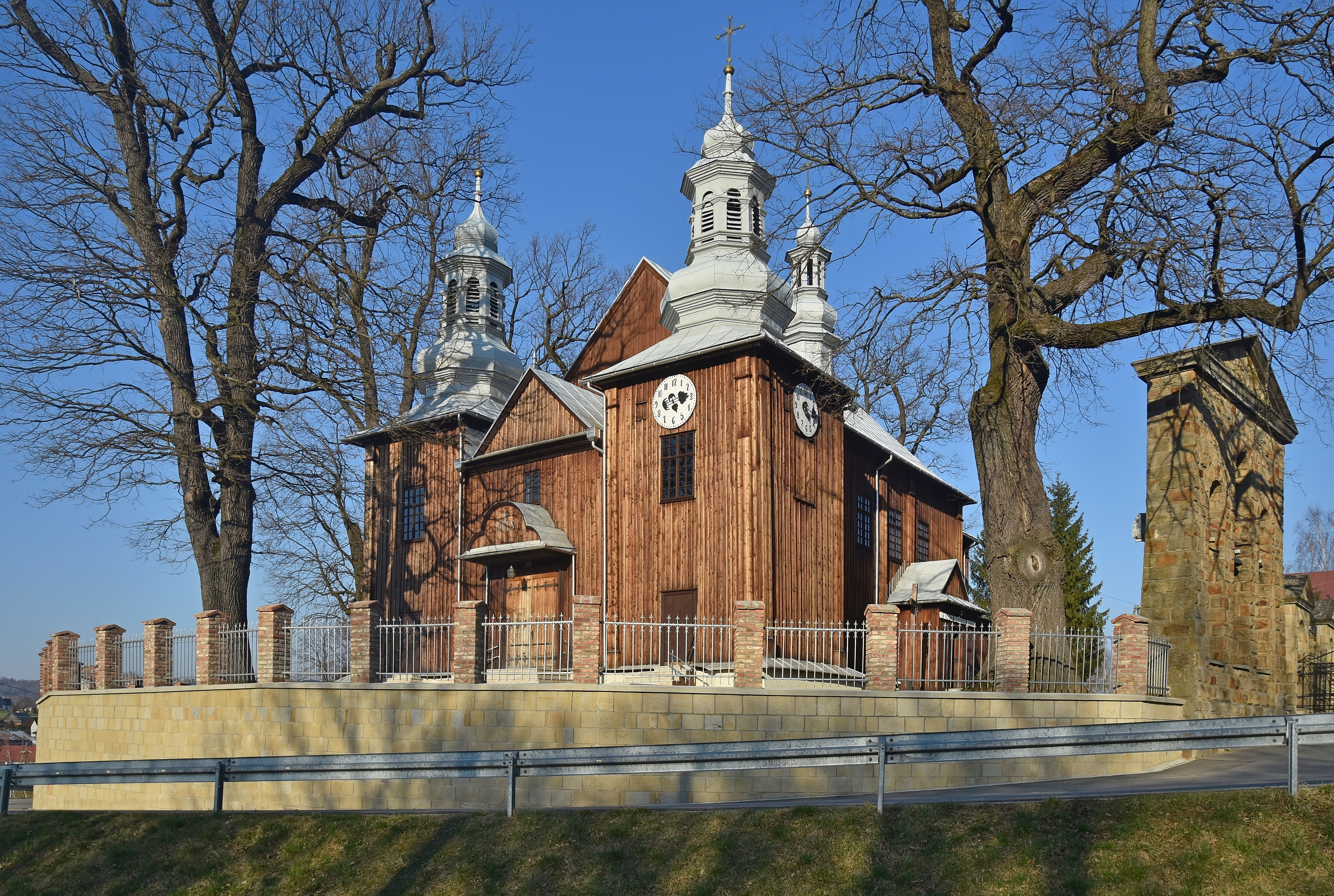
- Immaculate Conception of Virgin Mary Church

- Location within Poland
- Coordinates: 49°45′7″N 21°56′37″E
- Country: Poland
- Voivodeship: Subcarpathian
- County: Brzozów
- Gmina: Jasienica Rosielna
- Population: 2,100

Jasienica Rosielna [jaɕɛˈɲit͡sa rɔˈɕɛlna] is a village in Brzozów County, Subcarpathian Voivodeship, in south-eastern Poland. It is the seat of the gmina (administrative district) called Gmina Jasienica Rosielna.

== History ==
As a result of the first of Partitions of Poland (Treaty of St-Petersburg dated 5 July 1772, Jasienica (and the Galicia) was attributed to the Habsburg Monarchy. It was part of the Bezirkshauptmannschaft Brzozow (Brzozów County).

For more details, see the article Kingdom of Galicia and Lodomeria.

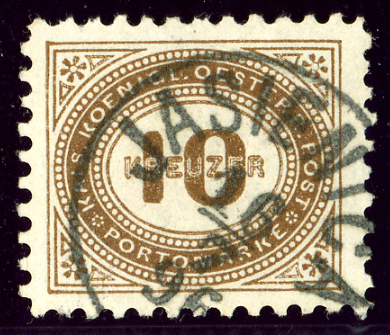
Austrian KK 10 kreuzer tax stamp, cancelled in 1896
