= Orzechówka, Podkarpackie Voivodeship =

Orzechówka
- Village
- Location within Poland
- Coordinates: 49°43′45″N 21°56′38″E
- Country: Poland
- Voivodeship: Subcarpathian
- County: Brzozów
- Gmina: Jasienica Rosielna
- Elevation: 329 m (1,079 ft)
- Population: 1,550

Orzechówka [ɔʐɛˈxufka] is a village in the administrative district of Gmina Jasienica Rosielna, within Brzozów County, Subcarpathian Voivodeship, in south-eastern Poland.
