= Gmina Jasienica Rosielna =

Gmina Jasienica Rosielna Jasienica Rosielna Commune
- Gmina
- Flag Coat of arms
- Interactive map of Gmina Jasienica Rosielna
- Coordinates (Jasienica Rosielna): 49°45′7″N 21°56′37″E
- Country: Poland
- Voivodeship: Subcarpathian
- County: Brzozów
- Seat: Jasienica Rosielna

Area
  - Total: 57.08 km^{2} (22.04 sq mi)

Population (2006)
  - Total: 7,380
  - Density: 129/km^{2} (335/sq mi)
- Website: http://www.jasienicarosielna.pl/

Gmina Jasienica Rosielna is a rural gmina (administrative district) in Brzozów County, Subcarpathian Voivodeship, in south-eastern Poland. Its seat is the village of Jasienica Rosielna, which lies approximately 9 kilometres (6 mi) north-west of Brzozów and 32 km (20 mi) south of the regional capital Rzeszów.

The gmina covers an area of 57.08 square kilometres (22.0 sq mi), and as of 2006 its total population is 7,380.

The gmina contains part of the protected area called Czarnorzeki-Strzyżów Landscape Park.

== Villages ==
Gmina Jasienica Rosielna contains the villages and settlements of Blizne, Jasienica Rosielna, Orzechówka and Wola Jasienicka.

== Neighbouring gminas ==
Gmina Jasienica Rosielna is bordered by the gminas of Brzozów, Domaradz, Haczów and Korczyna.
