= Gmina Brzozów =

Gmina Brzozów Brzozów Commune
- Gmina
- Flag Coat of arms
- Interactive map of Gmina Brzozów
- Coordinates (Brzozów): 49°41′43″N 22°1′10″E
- Country: Poland
- Voivodeship: Subcarpathian
- County: Brzozów
- Seat: Brzozów

Area
  - Total: 104.59 km^{2} (40.38 sq mi)

Population (2006)
  - Total: 26,044
  - Density: 249.01/km^{2} (644.93/sq mi)
  - Urban: 7,699
  - Rural: 18,345
- Website: http://brzozow.pl/

Gmina Brzozów is an urban-rural gmina (administrative district) in Brzozów County, Subcarpathian Voivodeship, in south-eastern Poland. Its seat is the town of Brzozów, which lies approximately 38 kilometres (24 mi) south of the regional capital Rzeszów.

The gmina covers an area of 104.59 square kilometres (40.4 sq mi), and as of 2020 its total population is 26,044, of which the population of Brzozów is 7,699, and the population of the rural part of the gmina is 18,345.

== Villages ==
Apart from the town of Brzozów, Gmina Brzozów contains the villages and settlements of Górki, Grabownica Starzeńska, Humniska, Stara Wieś, Turze Pole, Wola Górecka and Zmiennica, Przysietnica, Stara Wieś

== Neighbouring gminas ==
Gmina Brzozów is bordered by the gminas of Domaradz, Dydnia, Haczów, Jasienica Rosielna, Nozdrzec, Sanok and Zarszyn.
