= Gmina Nozdrzec =

Gmina Nozdrzec Nozdrzec Commune
- Gmina
- Flag Coat of arms
- Interactive map of Gmina Nozdrzec
- Coordinates (Nozdrzec): 49°46′N 22°10′E
- Country: Poland
- Voivodeship: Subcarpathian
- County: Brzozów
- Seat: Nozdrzec

Area
  - Total: 120.08 km^{2} (46.36 sq mi)

Population (2006)
  - Total: 8,492
  - Density: 70.72/km^{2} (183.2/sq mi)
- Website: http://www.nozdrzec.pl

Gmina Nozdrzec is a rural gmina (administrative district) in Brzozów County, Subcarpathian Voivodeship, in south-eastern Poland. Its seat is the village of Nozdrzec, which lies approximately 17 kilometres (11 mi) north-east of Brzozów and 32 km (20 mi) south-east of the regional capital Rzeszów.

The gmina covers an area of 120.08 square kilometres (46.4 sq mi)

As of 2006 its total population is 8,492.

== Villages ==
Gmina Nozdrzec contains the villages and settlements of Hłudno, Huta Poręby, Izdebki, Nozdrzec, Rudawiec, Ryta Górka, Siedliska, Ujazdy, Wara, Wesoła, Wola Wołodzka and Wołodź.

== Neighbouring gminas ==
Gmina Nozdrzec is bordered by the gminas of Bircza, Błażowa, Brzozów, Domaradz, Dydnia and Dynów.
