= Wesoła, Podkarpackie Voivodeship =

Wesoła
- Village
- Location within Poland
- Coordinates: 49°48′N 22°5′E
- Country: Poland
- Voivodeship: Subcarpathian
- County: Brzozów
- Gmina: Nozdrzec
- Population (approx.): 1,000

Wesoła [vɛˈsɔwa] is a village in the administrative district of Gmina Nozdrzec, within Brzozów County, Subcarpathian Voivodeship, in south-eastern Poland.

Wesoła has around 1,525 people, with about the same number of men and women.
