= Gmina Dydnia =

Gmina Dydnia Dydnia Commune
- Gmina
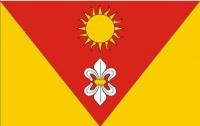
- Flag Coat of arms
- Interactive map of Gmina Dydnia
- Coordinates (Dydnia): 49°41′25″N 22°9′38″E
- Country: Poland
- Voivodeship: Subcarpathian
- County: Brzozów
- Seat: Dydnia

Area
  - Total: 130.02 km^{2} (50.20 sq mi)

Population (2006)
  - Total: 8,222
  - Density: 63.24/km^{2} (163.8/sq mi)
- Website: http://www.gminadydnia.pl/

Gmina Dydnia is a rural gmina (administrative district) in Brzozów County, Subcarpathian Voivodeship, in south-eastern Poland. Its seat is the village of Dydnia, which lies approximately 11 kilometres (7 mi) east of Brzozów and 40 km (25 mi) south of the regional capital Rzeszów.

The gmina covers an area of 130.02 square kilometres (50.2 sq mi), and as of 2006 its total population is 8,222.

== Villages ==
Gmina Dydnia contains the villages and settlements of Dydnia, Grabówka, Jabłonica Ruska, Jabłonka, Końskie, Krzemienna, Krzywe, Niebocko, Niewistka, Obarzym, Temeszów, Ulucz, Witryłów and Wydrna.

== Neighbouring gminas ==
Gmina Dydnia is bordered by the gminas of Bircza, Brzozów, Nozdrzec and Sanok.
