= Hłudno =

- Village
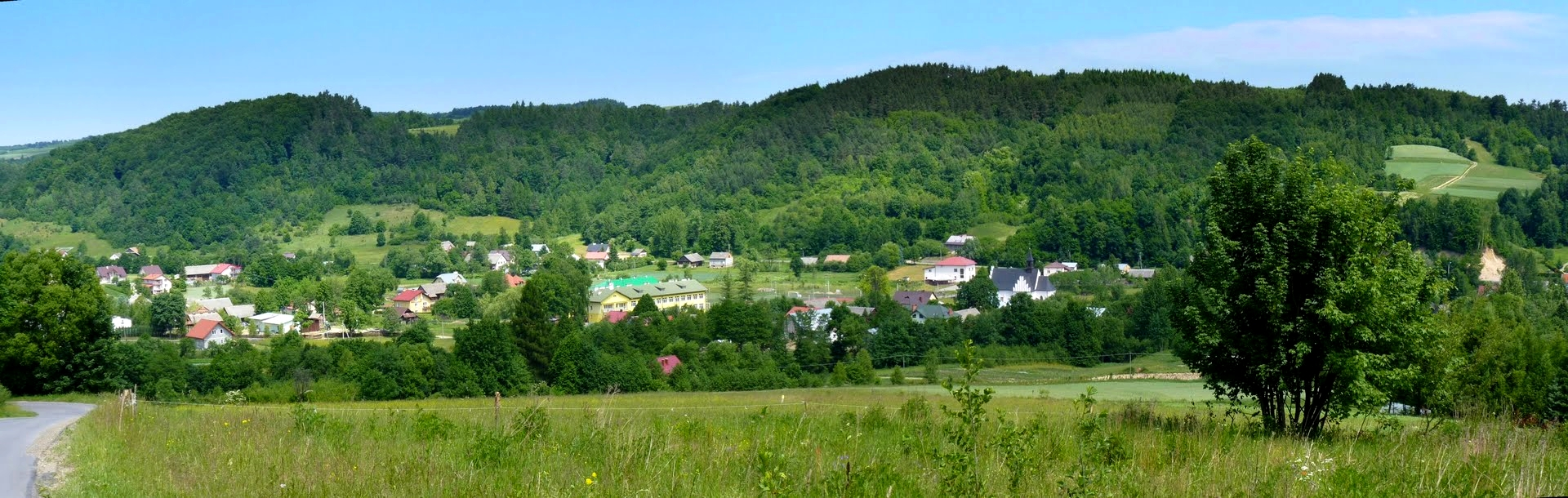
- General view

- Location within Poland
- Coordinates: 49°47′N 22°9′E
- Country: Poland
- Voivodeship: Subcarpathian
- County: Brzozów
- Gmina: Nozdrzec

Hłudno [ˈxwudnɔ] is a village in the administrative district of Gmina Nozdrzec, within Brzozów County, Subcarpathian Voivodeship, in south-eastern Poland.

== Notable people ==
- Patriarch Dymytriy (Yarema)
