= Dydnia =

- Village
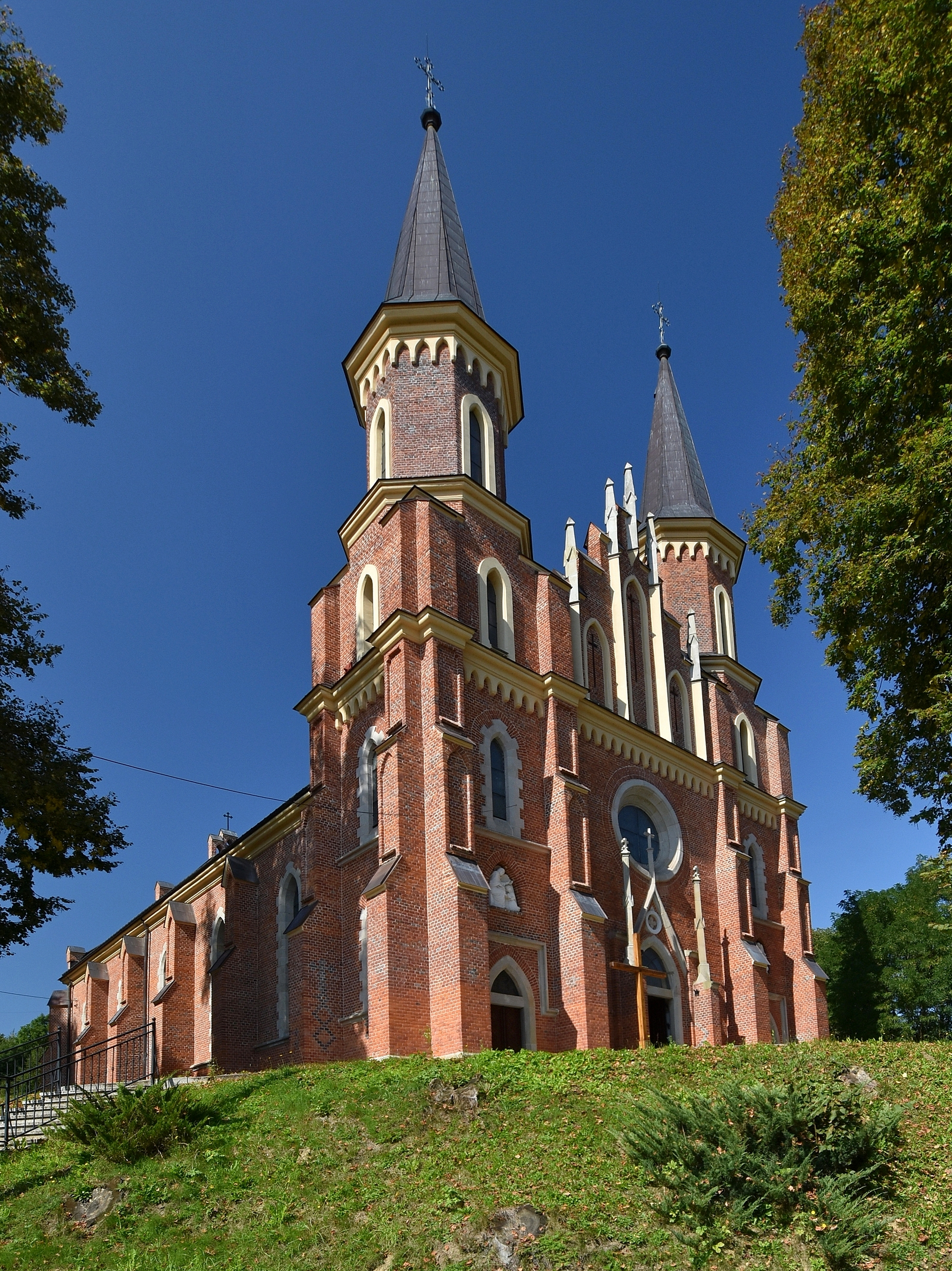
- building in Dydnia

- Location within Poland
- Coordinates: 49°41′25″N 22°9′38″E
- Country: Poland
- Voivodeship: Subcarpathian
- County: Brzozów
- Gmina: Dydnia
- Population: 1,600

Dydnia [ˈdɨdɲa] is a village in Brzozów County, Subcarpathian Voivodeship, in southeastern Poland. It is the seat of the gmina (administrative district) called Gmina Dydnia.

As of 2015, the village had a population of 1,600 inhabitants.
