= Brzozów County =

Brzozów County Powiat brzozowski
- County
- Flag Coat of arms

- Location within the voivodeship

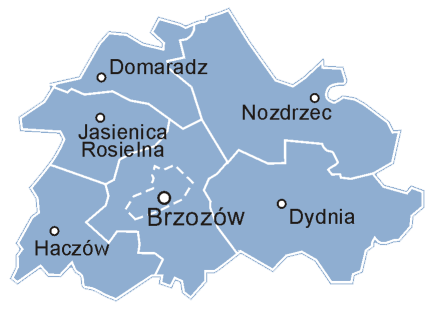
- Division into gminas
- Coordinates (Brzozów): 49°41′43″N 22°1′10″E
- Country: Poland
- Voivodeship: Subcarpathian
- Seat: Brzozów
- Gminas: Total 6: Gmina Brzozów; Gmina Domaradz; Gmina Dydnia; Gmina Haczów; Gmina Jasienica Rosielna; Gmina Nozdrzec

Area
  - Total: 540 km^{2} (210 sq mi)

Population (2019)
  - Total: 65,652
  - Density: 120/km^{2} (310/sq mi)
  - Urban: 7,463
  - Rural: 58,189
- Car plates: RBR
- Website: www.powiatbrzozow.pl

Brzozów County (Polish: powiat brzozowski) is a unit of territorial administration and local government (powiat) in Subcarpathian Voivodeship, south-eastern Poland. It came into being on January 1, 1999, as a result of the Polish local government reforms passed in 1998. Its administrative seat and only town is Brzozów, which lies 38 kilometres (24 mi) south of the regional capital Rzeszów.

The county covers an area of 540.00 square kilometres (208.5 sq mi). As of 2019 its total population is 65,652, out of which the population of Brzozów is 7,463, and the rural population is 58,189.

== Neighbouring counties ==
Brzozów County is bordered by Rzeszów County to the north, Przemyśl County to the east, Sanok County to the south-east, Krosno County to the west and Strzyżów County to the north-west.

== Administrative divisions ==
The county is subdivided into six gminas (one urban-rural and five rural). These are listed in the following table, in descending order of population.

Gmina	Type	Area (km^{2})	Population (2019)	Seat
Gmina Brzozów	urban-rural	105	26,653	Brzozów
Gmina Haczów	rural	73	9,114	Haczów
Gmina Nozdrzec	rural	120	8,047	Nozdrzec
Gmina Dydnia	rural	130	7,910	Dydnia
Gmina Jasienica Rosielna	rural	57	7,828	Jasienica Rosielna
Gmina Domaradz	rural	56	6,100	Domaradz
