= Haczów =

- Village
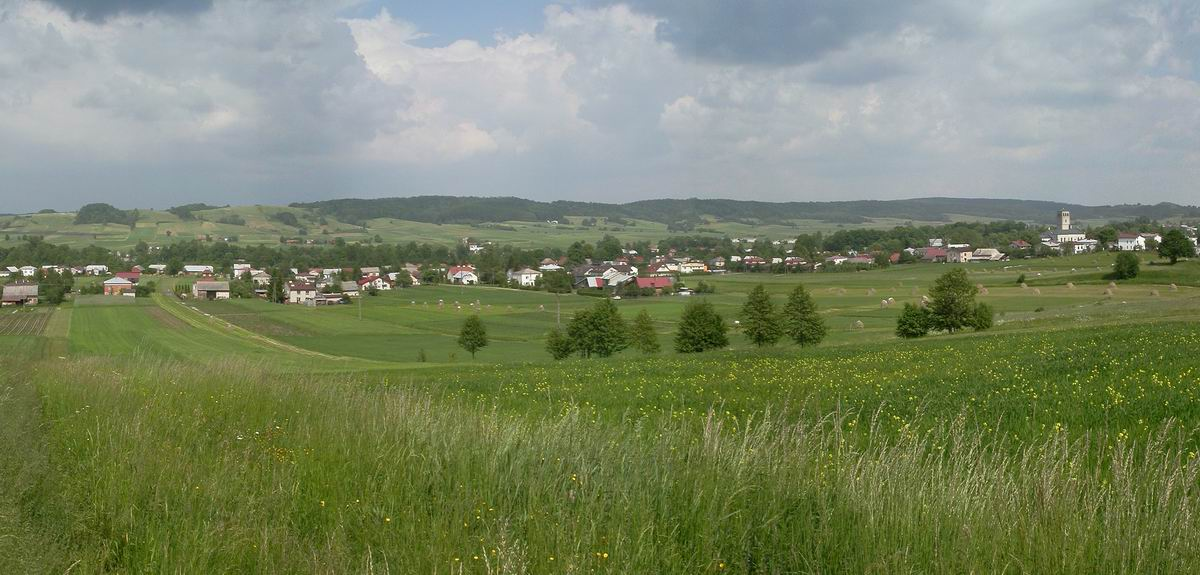
- View of the village

- Coat of arms

- Location within Poland
- Coordinates: 49°39′52″N 21°54′5″E
- Country: Poland
- Voivodeship: Subcarpathian
- County: Brzozów
- Gmina: Haczów
- Elevation: 284 m (932 ft)

Population
  - Total: 3,370

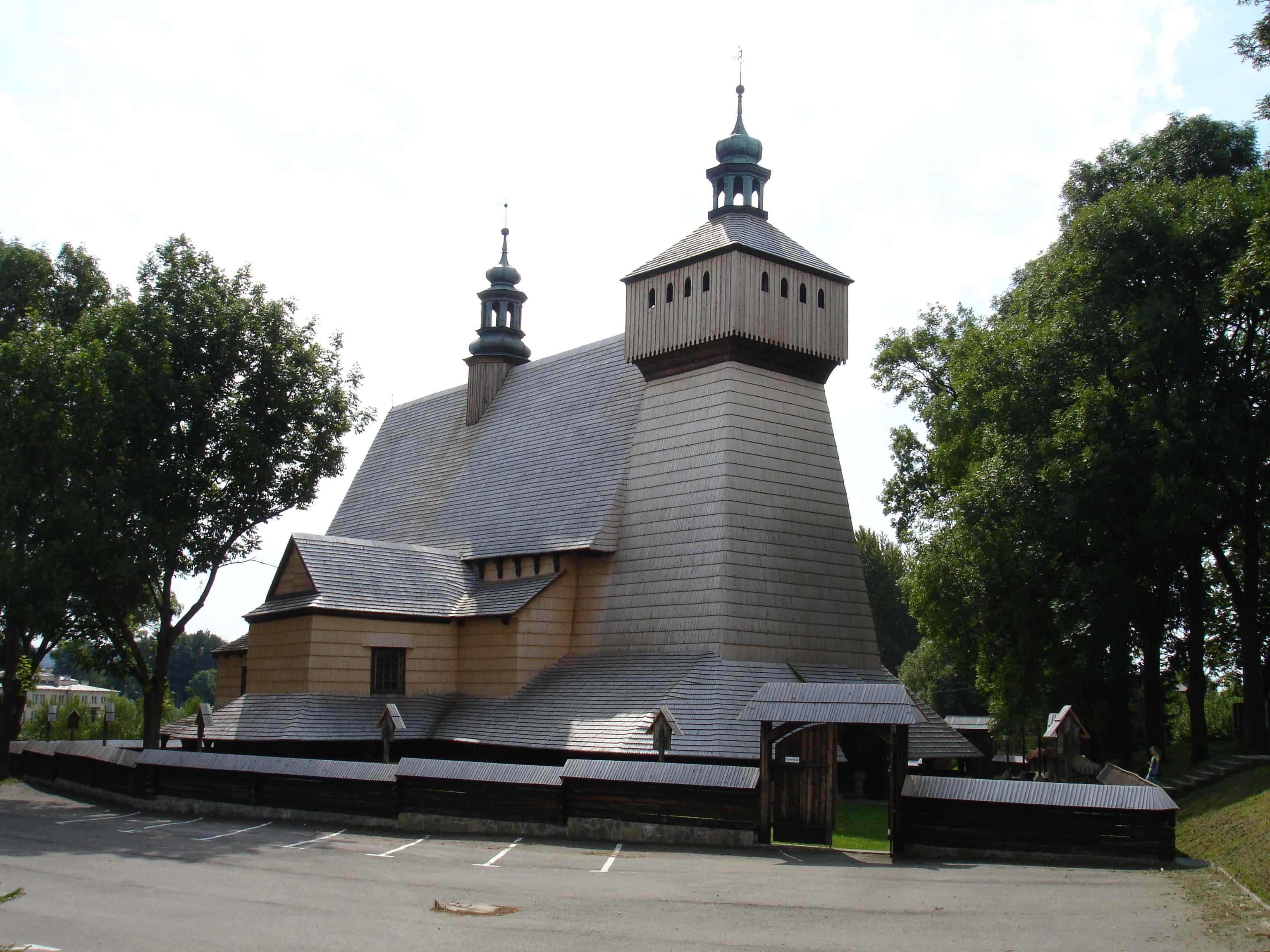
Church of the Assumption of Holy Mary and St. Michael's Archangel, in Haczów (Poland), the oldest wooden gothic temples in Europe, erected in the 14th century, on the UNESCO list of World Heritage Sites since 2003.

Haczów [ˈxat͡ʂuf] is a village in Brzozów County, Subcarpathian Voivodeship, in south-eastern Poland. It is the seat of the gmina (administrative district) called Gmina Haczów.

In 1975–1998, Haczów was located in the Krosno Voivodeship.

The village is the site of Assumption of Mary and St. Michael's Archangel church, built in the end of the 14th century. In 1624, it was severely damaged by Tatar attacks.

The site is one of the six with Wooden Churches of Southern Little Poland, on the UNESCO list of World Heritage Sites since 2003. Inside a valuable figural wall paintings dating from 1494 can be seen. The church has recently been renovated. It is believed that the Haczów church is the biggest Gothic wooden church in Europe.

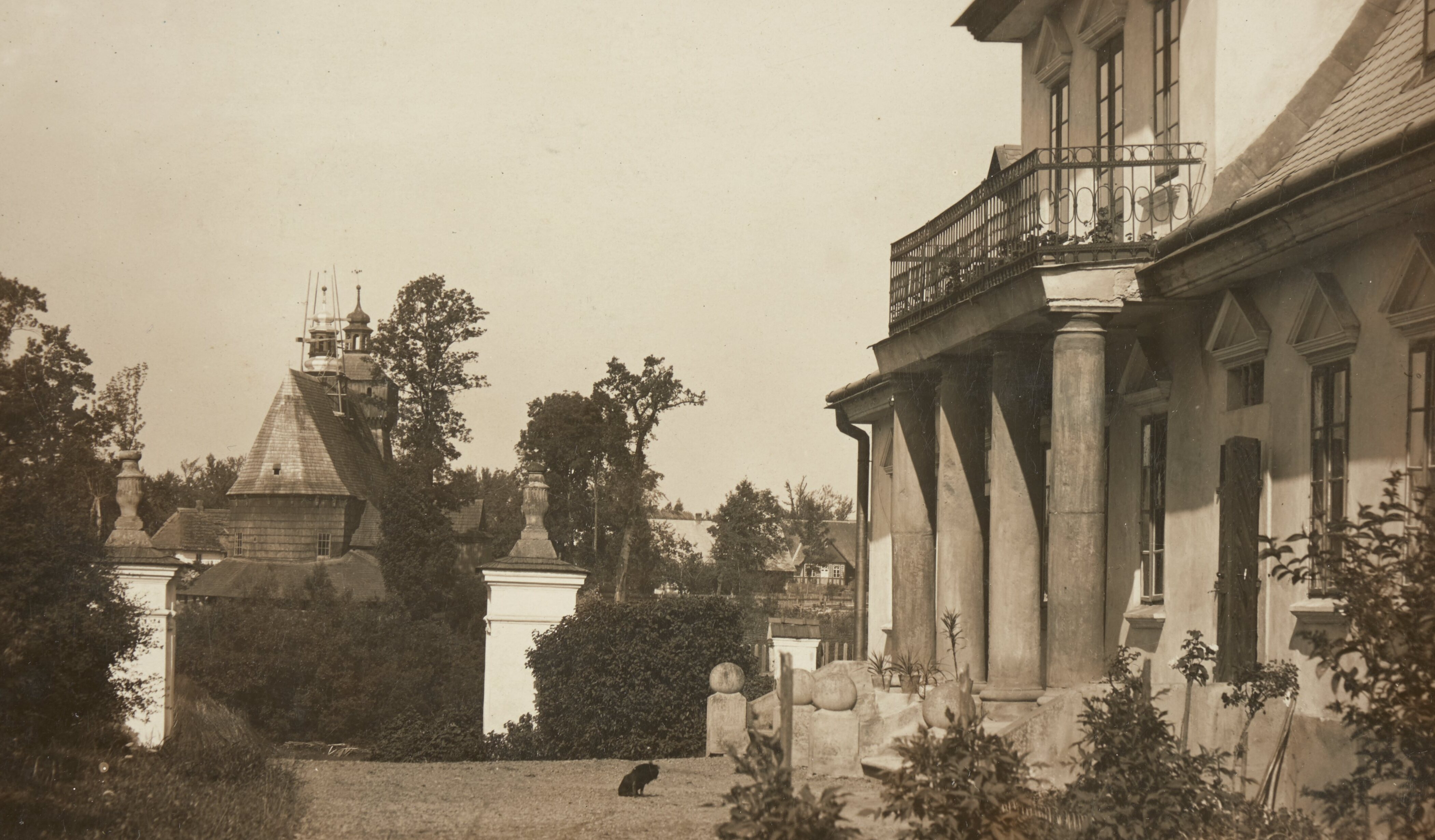
Manor house in Haczów, 1934

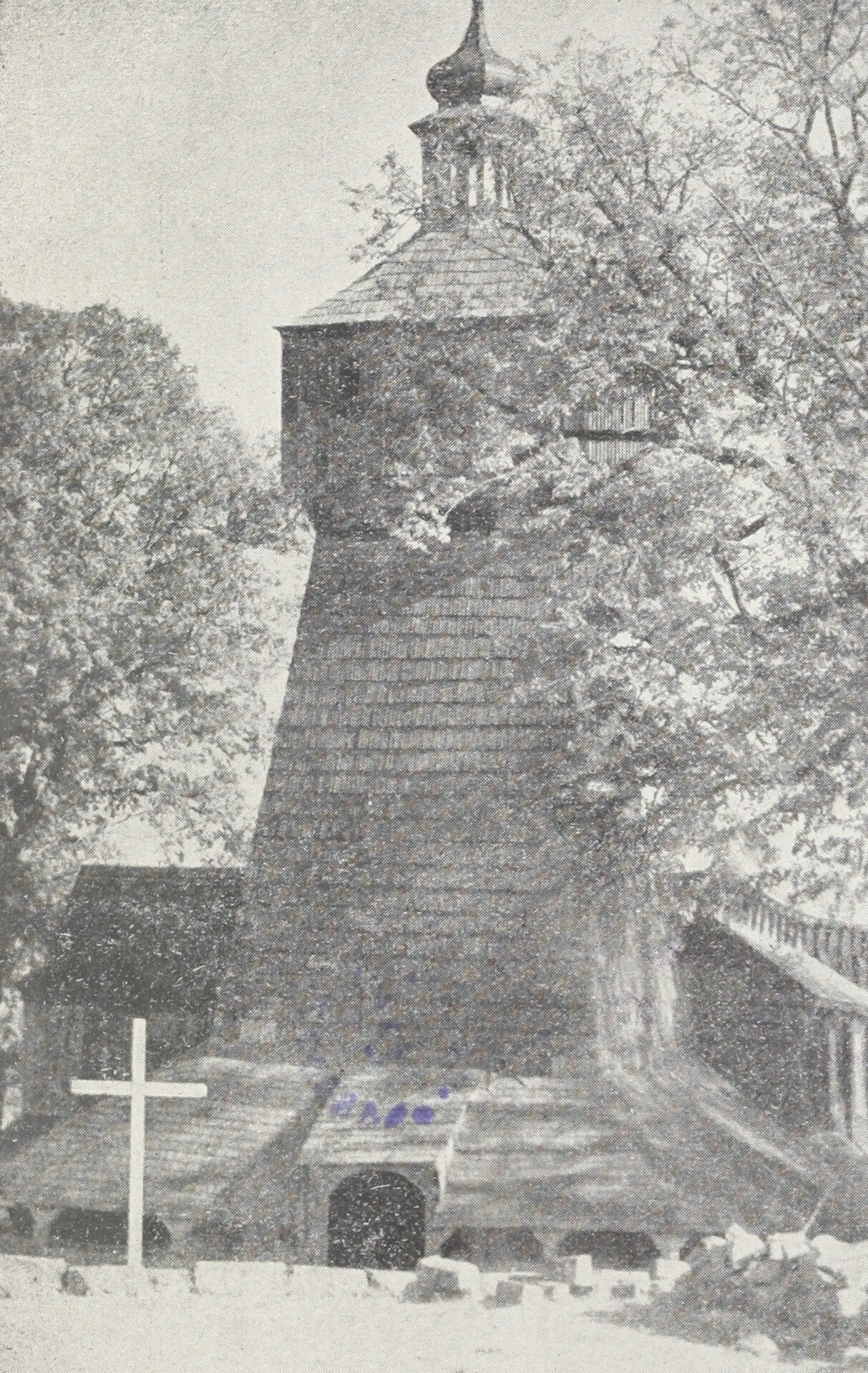
Manor house in Haczów, before 1934

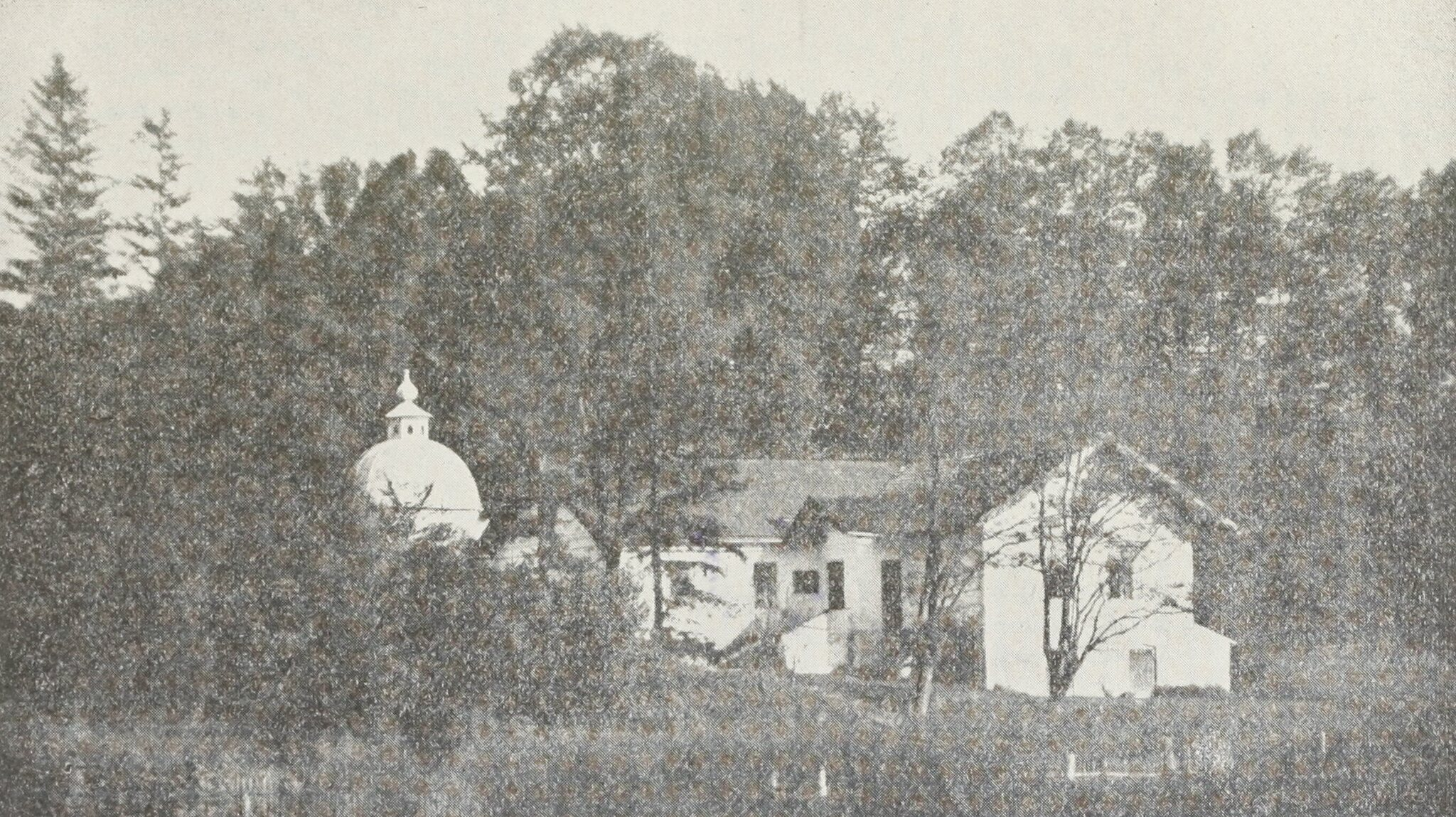
Manor house in Haczów, before 1934

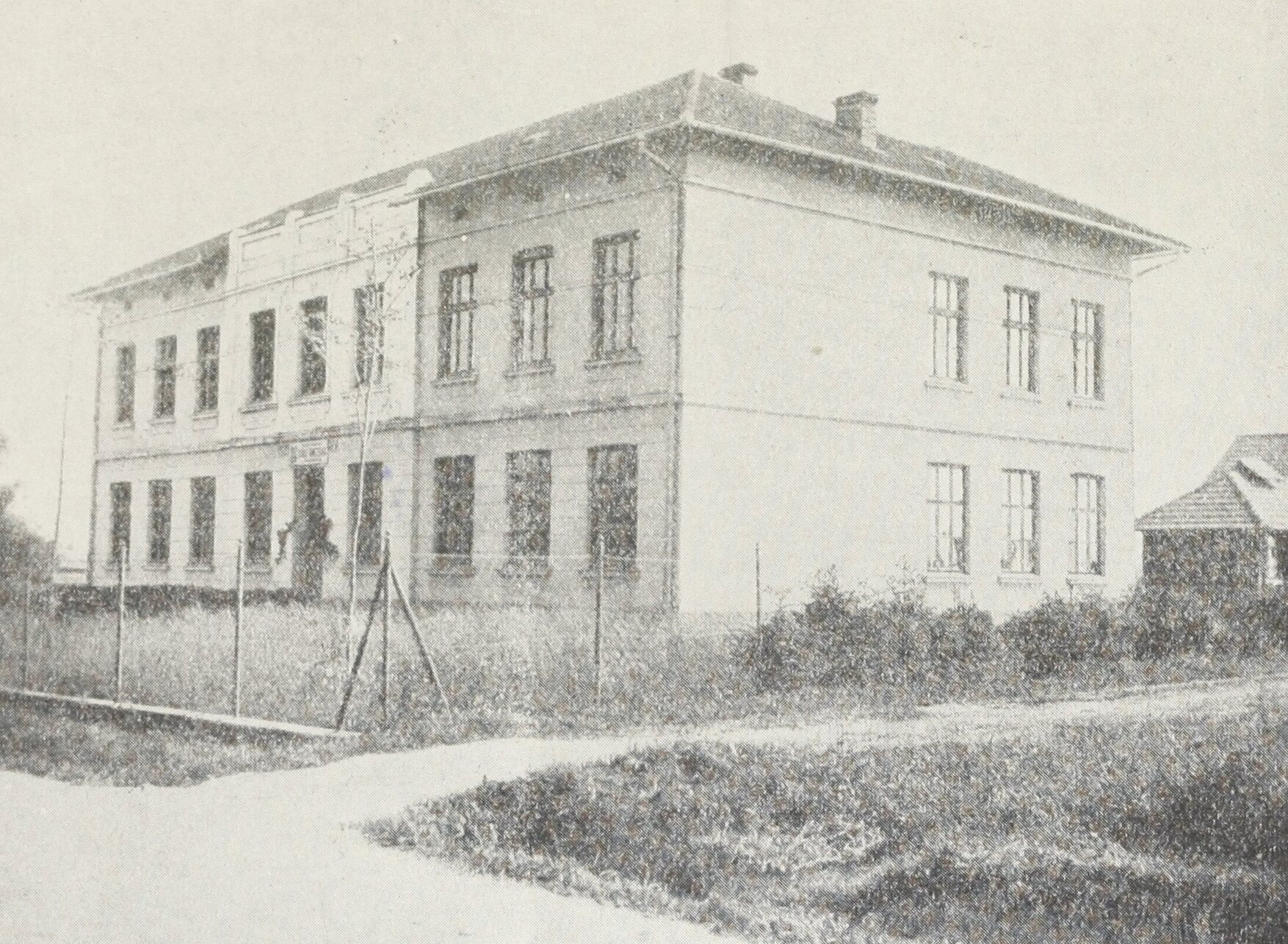
New school, before 1936

== Etymology ==
The origin of the name of the village comes from combination of the name Hans and Hoff, which when translated means "John's Farm". This probably refers to the founder/investor of the village. In documents dating from 1388, the village is referenced as Haczów. This changes in 1400 to Hoczew, and finally back to Haczów in 1425.

=== Surnames of the inhabitants ===
In the parish censuses from 1432 to 1440, there are many German names in Haczów: Benner (now Bonar), Dressler (Dreslar), Weiss (Weys, Weisz), Nickel (Nikiel), Scholz (Szulc), Gerlach (now Gierlach, Gierloch), Glockenbrecht, Hansel, Sauhaar, Zöckler, Grob, Niebel, Keller (Kyellar, now Kielar/Kielur), Springler (Szprynglar), Krauss (Krausz), Meierth, Haechsler, Ross, Strampe, Paetzhold, Kolb, Rosenberg (Rozenbark, Rozembark, now Rozenbajgier), Rautenkranz, Schindler (now Szyndlar), Struner, Polnar (Pojnar), Kassner, Regel, Heckerth (Ekiert), Matthorn, Rothbart, Szmyd, Scheiner, Reichel (Rajchel), Vlamann, Fakenday, Rumpel, Reiss (Riss, now Rysz), Schwarz, Tasz, Schmidt, Büttner (now Butnar/Bytnar).

The origin of the population caused Haczów much controversy and discussion. Political activists associated with the national democrats along with other researchers pointed towards the cultural changes associated with early colonization. Currently, residents of the names of German origin represent 70% of the population, while the remaining residents have the names of native Polish or Ukrainian-Lemko origin .

== Geography ==
The village lies west of Brzozów and east of Krosno. The village is extended along the Wisłok river for 7 km (4.35 mi) and the entire village covers an area approximately 25 km^{2} (9.7 sq mi).

== History ==
=== 1388-1772 ===
The first mention of Haczów from 1352, when Casimir III the Great issued a foundation charter for the colony of "Haczów". The village was founded in 1378 by the Walddeutsche on Magdeburg Law as a German Settlement village named Hanshoff, Hanshau.

On February 7, 1388, king Wladyslaw Jagiello confirmed the foundation document and he created the Roman Catholic parish in Haczów during his stay in Sandomierz. Archaeologists have discovered church burials from the late 14th or early 15th century, which show the size of the city in those times. From this time period the Pietà originates, which was later crowned by Pope John Paul II in 1997 in Krosno.

In 1402, the parish was bought by Schindeler Mathias, a cechmistrz from Krosno. In the year 1426 the village was sold for 300 parish fines. The proof of the kingship of these sites are provided by a document from 1504 in which King Aleksander Jagiellończyk gave Sanok, Haczów, Besko, and Wróblik Jan of Tarnow to a Ruthenian palatine in exchange for the loan of 2,300 zł. In 1520, king Zygmunt II August allowed a steward of Queen Jadwiga' court to purchase for 1200 zł the sołectwo of Haczów, and again in 1533 the king allowed the treasurer of the royal court, Marcin Wolski, to purchase the parish and sołectwo from the heirs of the deceased Nicholas Piotrowski . According to church documents, in 1604 the local population still spoke German (see Walddeutsche ), thus explaining the origin of the polonised German names which the villagers have today. In 1624 the village was mostly destroyed by the Tatars, among the things that survived was the church. During this period, a number of cholera epidemics swept the village and in 1698 a large fire destroyed the majority of the village.

The owners of the Haczów sołectwo are:

- 1426 - Mathias Schindeler, the cechmistrz from Krosno
- 1520 - Mikołaj Piotrowski, the court chamberlain of Queen Jadwiga
- 1533 - Marcin Wolski, the treasurer and standard-bearer of the royal court of Sigismund I the Old
- 1698 - Marcin Jerzy Wybranowski

=== 1772-1914 ===
After the partition of Poland in 1772, Haczów was under Austrian rule . That same year a new statute went in which forbade the burial of the dead near churches which was to reduce the chances of epidemics. On March 15, 1775, the German language became the official language in schools.

In the period preceding to the outbreak of the Uprising of Krakow, operating in Haczów from 1845 to 1846 was an emissary of the National Government, Julian Goslar, who proclaimed among the peasants the National Government's decision to abolish serfdom and to spread its "new gospel to the Polish people." Austrian agents sensing danger, pinned the serfs against count Felix Urbanski and Julian Goslar in order to prevent the chances of an uprising in the region. On January 22, 1846, the serfs disarmed the count in the marketplace and handed him over to Austrian authorities in Sanok along with the priest, Walenty Zgrzebnym.

In 1869 the region was visited by geographer Wincenty Pol who was amazed that Walddeutsche settles who settled in the region along the Wisłok, spoke with such a fluent lesser Poland accent that it is almost impossible to recognize the settlers' German origin.

In the year 1900, Haczów had 2,689 inhabitants; of which 2,150 were Roman Catholics, 486 were Greek-Catholic, and 50 were Jews. Until 1914, the village was one of the richest municipalities in the province of Galicia.

=== World War I ===
When World War I started on the fourth of August 1914 it had an immediate impact on the lives of the Haczowian. A general mobilization order was sent out and all of the eligible men were sent off to serve in the Austro-Hungarian Army. The front eventually moved closer to Haczów and in September of that year, the sound of the artillery was heard, signaled the approach of the Russian army. The first Russian patrols appeared in Haczów on September 26, 1914. On October 4, 1914, a Cossack patrol raided the village only to be pushed back by the Austro-Hungarian Army. In November, the Austro-Hungarian army started a general retreat towards the Carpathian mountains and the last troops left Haczów on November 10. Shortly after a Russian patrol consisting of around 100 cossacks came into the village and started to pillage it. In December 1914, in particularly from December 10 to 12, large columns of the Russian army passed through the village in the direction of the Carpathian Mountains. However three days later, on December 15 the Russians started to retreat and fighting occurred between the two opposing armies which resulted in the destruction of a few houses as well as the death of three civilians. On December 16, 1914, the first units of the Austro-Hungarian army started to advance through the village. However, on December 22, 1914, the Austro-Hungarian army started to withdraw and once again the Russian army quartered in Haczów. The commander of Russian army, Radko Dymitrjew as well as Nikolai Mikolajewicz were quartered in the village.

In the spring of 1915, the Russian army started to retreat from the region of Dukla and this resulted in a tremendous battle that began on May 8, 1915. During the course of this battle, 42 houses were burned and a number of civilians were killed including Maria Szuber who was hacked to death by the retreating Russian troops. The church also was slightly damaged after a grenade started a small fire which was eventually put out. After the battle, the front never again swept through Haczów. The German and Austro-Hungarians maintained up until the conclusion of the Eastern front a makeshift field hospital that was located at the local school.

=== Interwar Period (1918-1939) ===
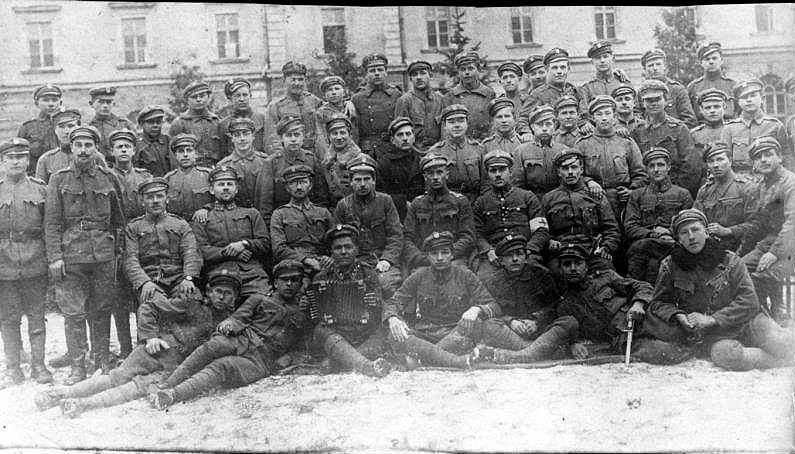
Polish troops in Chyrów, where a number of Haczowian fought.

Immediately following the conclusion of World War I, Haczów once again faced a new threat which this time were the Ukrainian nationalists as well as the Bolsheviks. In 1918, 250 locals volunteered in order to defend the sovereignty of the Second Polish Republic, they formed a company and were sent to Chyrów to fight against Ukrainian nationalists. During the Polish–Soviet War, the men from Haczów served bravery primary in artillery units and a number of soldiers returned to Haczów with the highest military order, the Virtuti Militari. The generosity of the Haczowian showed in 1919 when State Treasury made an appeal to raise money for the war effort, the locals responded by collecting a total of around a million koruna.

After the Polish-Soviet War, the village started to rebuild itself. In 1934 Haczów became the gmina (an administrative district) under which the following villages were contained in the gmina: Jabłonica Polska, Malinówka, Zmiennica, Trześniów, Buków, Jasionów, and Wzdów. In 1935 a monument was built in the memory of the Haczowian who died in the World War I as well as in the defense of the Second Polish Republic, initially there were 88 names of locals who died in the two conflicts.

=== World War II (1939–1944) ===
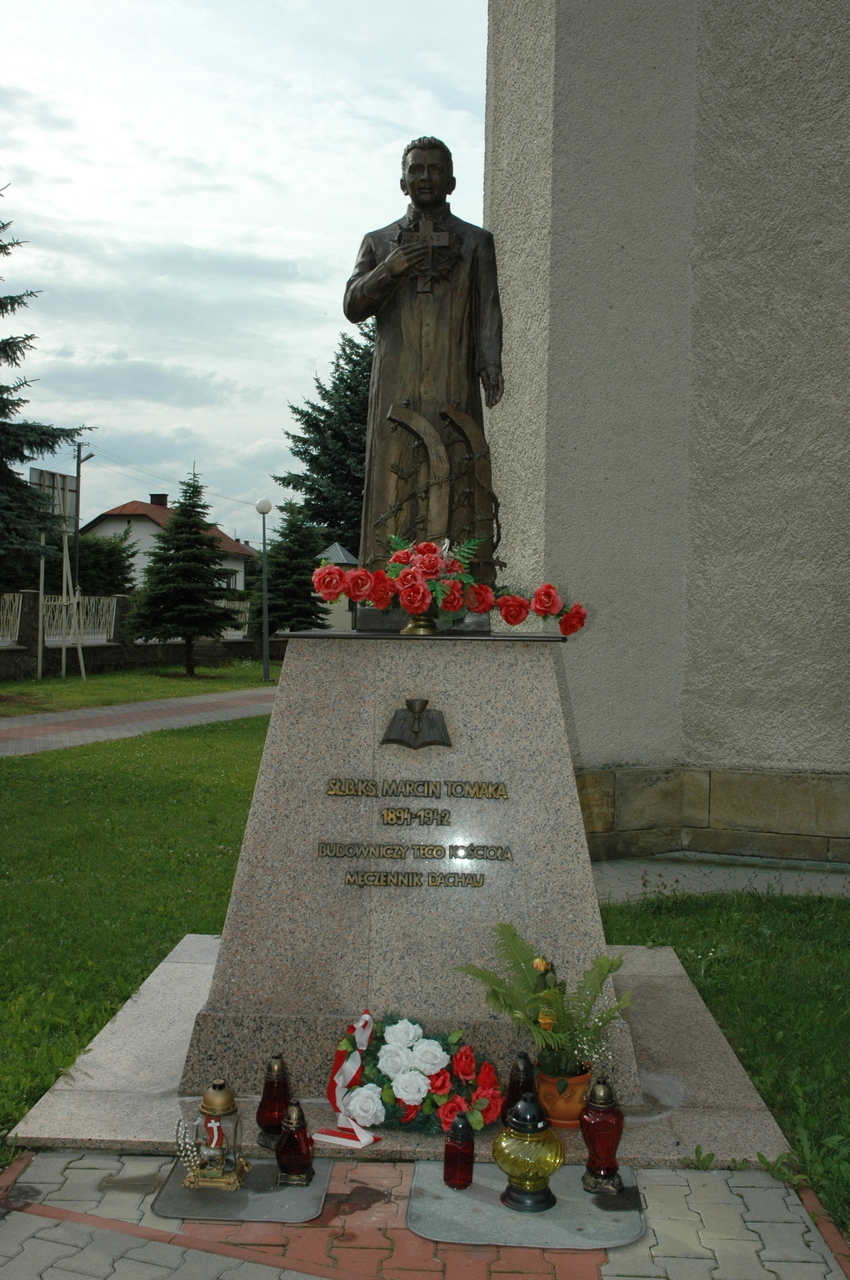
Monument of Fr. Marcin Tomaka, who died in Dachau

On September 9, 1939, Haczów came under German occupation when the elements of the German 1. Gebirgs Division marched into the village. Beginning from 1939 to 1940, the German authorities had tried, like Goralenvolk, to create a separate nation in Haczów. They created a new term for a Haczowian: Hatschower. However this turned out to be unsuccessful even after the threats of Nazi concentration camps as well as the promised benefits did not affect the residents of Haczów to admit to being Germans. Many, in order to avoid being conscripted into the German army, admitted to a Swedish nationality. (Sweden was a neutral country.) After the failing attempt of Germanisation, the first arrests started on June 19, 1940. The Haczowian pastor Fr. Marcin Tomaka was arrested on June 19, 1940, for keeping an illegal radio. He was first sent to a prison in Sanok and then was transported to Auschwitz. On December 12, 1940, he was sent to Dachau (his camp number was 22242) where he died on July 8, 1942. A total of 25 Haczowians died in concentration camps and 3 died as the result of being overworked on forced labor projects. The years of 1939–1940 were the hardest for the locals who suffered under the new requisitions, quotas and taxes. Many suffered from hunger as well as the ever-present fear of arrests. The Jewish population was taken to Rymanów, where they were massacred in the forest.

Haczów was the site of one of the most organized Polish Home Army groups in the entire Krosno inspectorate, nicknamed "Placówka - Tulipan" or the "Tulip" . It was the site of the armed partisan group, communication, underground intelligence, medical service, and propaganda groups. The commander of this partisan group was lieutenant Stanisław Nowak "Barbaty" from Haczów. Alongside him were his assistants and his staff, which included Stanisław Szuber, Andrzej Pniewski, Edward Szuber, as well as the group's chaplain, Fr. Mieczysław Bossowski. The partisan group was formed into four platoons which were led by:

- Mieczysław Klepacki "Szarak" - commander of the first platoon
- Bronisław Stepek "Wacław" - second platoon
- Jan Rychlicki - third platoon
- Jan Czyż - from Trześniów who commanded the fourth platoon

The partisan group was fairly active in the Brzozów area of operations for the Home Army. The staff would meet in the home of M. and H. Klepacki since the location was off to the side of the village. The group was involved in a number of armed actions as well as sabotage acts that were directed at the occupying German forces. One of the first sabotage acts occurred in the time period from June 23 to October 30, 1942, when the group dropped massive amounts of blacksmith nails on the roads between Targowiska- Jasienica Rosielna, Rymanów - Besko, as well as Trześniów - Wróblik Szlachecki. The nails were made by Jan Rozenbajger, who was a member of the partisan group as well as a blacksmith. These nails were then distributed to Jan Rysz and Andrzej Szopiak (both from Jabłonica) who would spread the nails on the designated routes. The following operation was for the group to excavate and remove ammunition and grenades that were left behind by the retreating Polish Army in 1939 in the garden of the Jasionów manor house. After gathering information from the countess Doszotów, the group decided to go ahead with the operation. In the operation that occurred during the end of October in 1943, ten partisans under the command of Lt. Nowak as well as six partisans from the Home Army group from Domaradz conducted the operation. Since there were German soldiers quartered in the manor house, the partisans split up their force into three groups - group one would provide cover for the manor house, the second group would cover the nearby roads from Brzozów to Jasionów, and the third group would retrieve the ammunition and grenades as well as load them onto horse-drawn carts that would take the items away. All of the partisans were armed in case of the expected clash between the Germans and the partisans, however the entire operation went without incident and the partisans retrieved a few boxes of grenades as well as ammunition. These items were taken to Zmiennica where they were inspected and finally preserved for future use. Half of the grenades went to the partisans in Haczów while the other half went to the group in Domaradz. The next operation occurred on June 18, 1944, which was to remove grain from a German mill located in Haczów. The operation was commanded by the assistant commander of the partisan force, Stanisław Szuber, while the group that was to provide cover was under Lt. Nowak who was located 2 km (1.24 mi) away from the mill in Wróblik. Twenty partisans were involved in the operation and during the early morning hours of June 19, 1944; the operation was completed and a total of 40 tons were taken from the German mill which was later redistributed among the poorest people in the Brzozów County.

The partisans were also used in a retaliation operation against Ukrainian nationalists in Besko in 1943 who were persecuting the local Polish population in that area. The penalties given to those that were convicted of hostility towards the Polish population were flogged. Those individuals who were considered more dangerous were executed on the spot.

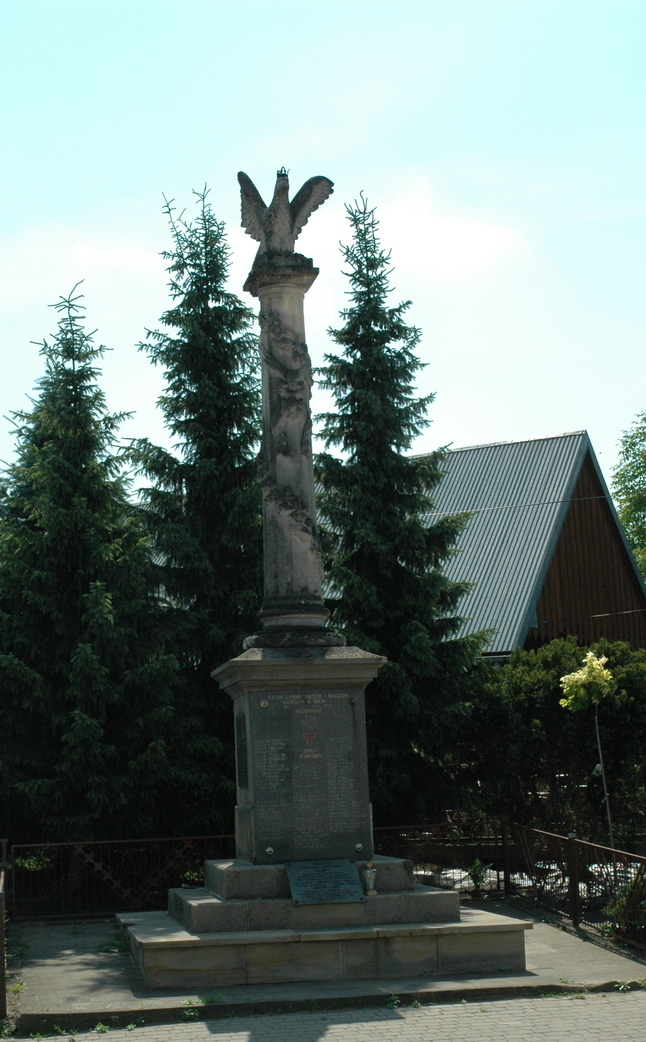
Monument dedicated to those who perished in 1914-1920 and in 1939-1945

During the German occupation, in the Haczów area there were two active confidents who served the occupants: Waleria Bębnów and her son Mieczysław Bębnów (who later fled Haczów under a false name probably to Germany). Bębnów was very active and she would try to get as much information as possible concerning the local population and whether they were breaking the occupant's laws. Many locals were arrested by the Gestapo, a number of them were executed on the spot and a few were sent to Auschwitz, never to return. "Bębenka", as the locals called her, used many different types of signals to communicate with the police and or with other confidents; for example when she had some information to give, she would put a picture of a Polish national symbol, the white eagle (which was not allowed by the local occupational authorities, and those who broke these rules would be severely punished), or other symbols that included flowers and different colored drapes. Even after many warnings from the Polish Underground, she continued to operate. Fearing for their lives, locals started to avoid her. In their opinions, it was through Waleria's actions that the village pastor was arrested and who later died in Dachau. Relatives and close friends of Fr. Tomaka would go to church every evening to listen to the radio in order to get information about the course of the war. Through someone's indiscretion, Waleria managed to get a hold of this information. When on June 19, 1940, the Gestapo came to the house of engineer Turkiewicz, his wife discreetly got out of the house to the warn the priests that the Gestapo would shortly come looking for them. The current curate, Fr. Mieczysław Bossowski (who was also the chaplain of the partisan unit stationed in Haczów), ran away and swam across the Wisłok river without his cassock and on the other side of the river a local woman who was working in the fields helped him get new clothes and eventually he managed to get to England. The pastor, Fr. Tomaka, being an older man, decided to stay behind and to talk the Gestapo since he knew German. Unfortunately the Gestapo arrested the pastor who later died in Dachau. Fr. Bossowski finally returned from England to visit Poland in 1991. For collaborating with Germans, on July 27, 1944, the Home Army partisans executed Waleria after conducting an operation to liberate cattle from the Germans. According to the locals, the next day her body was found and it appeared that she was executed while entering her house.

The partisans also undertook a risky daytime transfer of weapons from their safe houses to supply the partisans for the upcoming Operation Tempest. Three partisans undertook this risky operation: Władysław Szuber (who was the unit's quartermaster), his father Paweł Szuber, and Bronisław Budryk "Czesław" (a member of the Rzeszów district intelligence unit). The trio took a horse-drawn cart and went to Wola Jasienicka through the village of Wola Komborska to pick up the weapons. After meeting the warehouseman and after exchanging the prearranged passwords, they received a couple of Sten submachine guns along with ammunition and grenades. After hiding the weapons in bags of flour, they started their journey back home. On the way back, somewhere before the turn to Jabłonica in the village of Kombornia they encountered an oncoming automobile that was commandeered by Germans. The only option for the partisans was to open fire in case the car stopped to legitimize them. Fortunately the Germans only slowed down and passed the trio, they headed towards Iskrzynia and probably onwards to Krosno. However that was not the end of the troubles for the trio. In Haczów they encountered a member of the Blue Police who stopped them and started asking questions. Paweł Szuber answered that they were taking wheat to the mill, however that did not stop the policeman from putting his arm into the bag of grain where he felt the wooden crate in which the weapons were located. Seeing that they might be in trouble of compromising the operation, Bronisław Budryk jumped down from the cart which caused the pistol that he had to fall out of his coat onto the ground. Immediately the policeman figured out with whom he was dealing with and what they were carrying. The trio along with the policeman went onto a side road where they threatened him that if he told anything then he would expect death from the Home Army. This threat was satisfactory enough for the policeman and the incident went unreported. Paweł Szuber was a soldier who took part in the Polish-Soviet War and received the "Defenders of Eastern Kresów" medal for participating in the fighting in Przemyśl and in Lwów against the Ukrainians and the Soviets. Władysław Szuber, his son, was persecuted by the communist authorities from 1944 to 1947 for being a member of the Home Army; he later lived in Krosno.

Just before the Soviets advanced to the region, lieutenant Nowak ordered a mission to liberate the library of Dzieduski and Doszolów as well as their family fortune from the manor house in Jasionów before the Soviets could loot it. Mieczysław Klepacki was in command of the entire operation. After taking all of the belongings, they loaded all of it onto horse-drawn carts in the forest near the border of Trześniów–Zmiennica where it was taken to a Jesuit house in Stara Wies and later to Kraków.

During the second half of 1944, the locals experienced first hand the horror of war when the 1st Ukrainian Front moved through the region in the part of the Lvov–Sandomierz Offensive. In the fall of 1944, the Red army stopped for a few weeks on the Wisłok river, thus resulting in the village being split between the two sides. The northern side of the village was controlled by the Soviets while the southern side was controlled by the Germans. During this stalemate, 31 villagers died and many houses were destroyed as the result of the fighting. The Home army partisans conducted one final coordinated mission with the Soviets against the dug-in Germans. Lieutenant Nowak was able to gain contact with the Soviet forces on the other side of the river after he escorted a Soviet major who was trying to return to friendly lines after his tank was hit during the fighting in Krosno. Nowak agreed with the Soviet captain who was in command of the patrol to conduct a coordinated mission to gain information on the German forces by kidnapping the corporal who was in charge of the machine gun. In the next following days after the meeting, around 6:00 am, Lt. Nowak and a Soviet soldier crossed the Wisłok river and advanced to the position of the machine gun which was located next to the house of G. Klamut. The Soviet soldier waited in the nearby house of Ignacy Stypuły while Nowak went into the house of Klamut where he learned that the machine gun position was empty and that the corporal was currently in the bathroom. Nowak immediately after receiving this information ran to the bathroom and knocked the corporal out with the butt of his weapon and started to drag his body out of the house. However the German regained consciousness and started to run in the direction of where his fellow German soldiers were located. Seeing this, the Soviet soldier opened fire at the German, wounding him in the shoulder and in the check. Meanwhile, another Soviet ran up and the two soldiers whisked the German back to their side of the river. During this time, Lt. Nowak jumped into the machine gun position and removed the ammunition as well as the bolt, thus rendering the weapon useless. The result of the mission was the successful capture of the prisoner and the immobilization of the machine gun. After interrogating the prisoner, the Soviets gained the needed information of the layout of the German positions to plan for their next attack which happened after a few days. However, before the Soviets attacked, the Germans in retaliation for this mission arrested 12 locals and took them to the mines located near Targowiska. Those who were arrested were shortly released and returned home after a few days. Once the front completely passed through the region, Haczów was able to lick her wounds and to start to rebuild. After the fighting ceased, the Home Army partisan unit was disbanded.

=== Major Żubryd in Haczów (1945-1946) ===
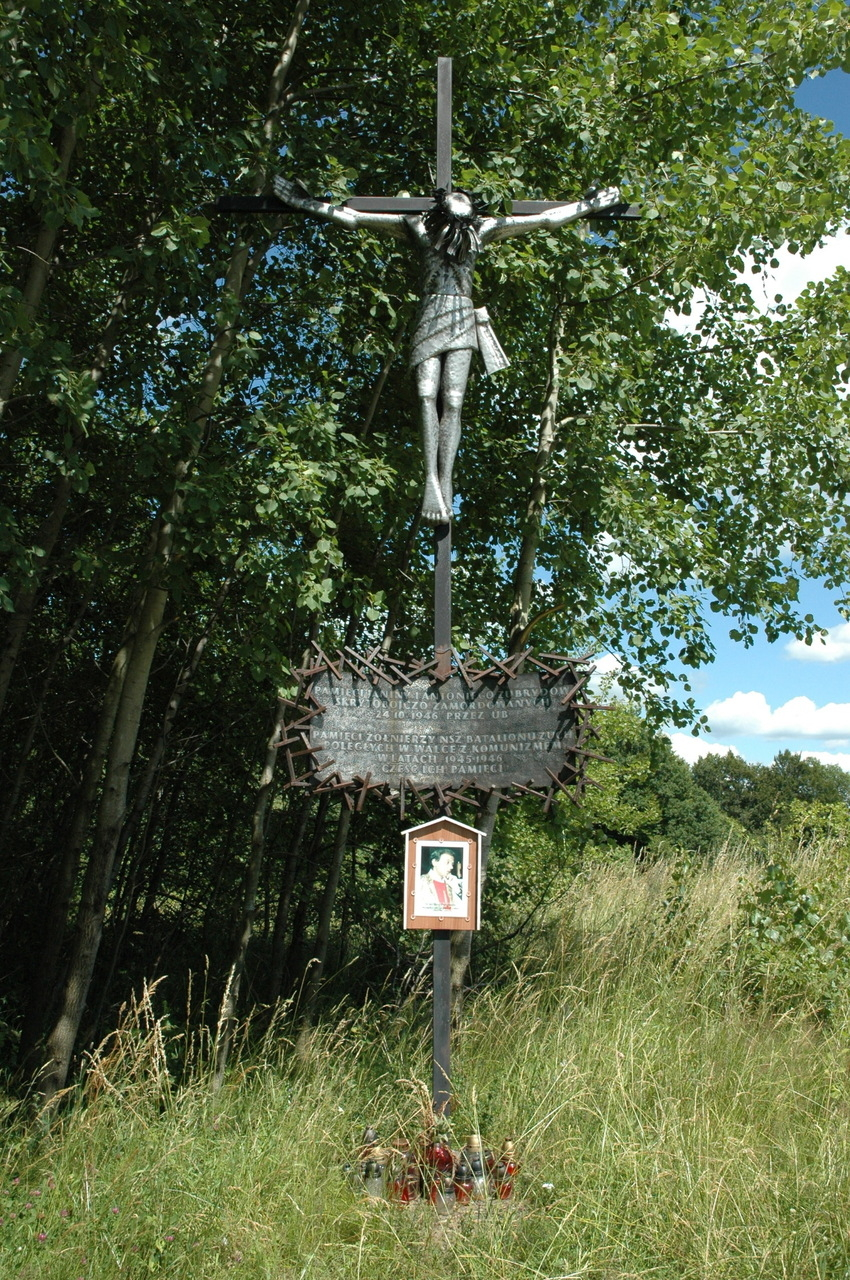
Monument dedicated to Maj. Antoni Żubryd

The end of World War II did not necessarily end the hostilities in the Haczów region. During the late 1940s and early 1950s many anti-communist partisan groups existed who continued to carry out armed resistance against the newly installed communist regime. One of these partisan groups was a National Armed Forces (NSZ) that was under command of major Antoni Żubryd. Before the war, Żubryd served as a non-commissioned officer in the Polish army until September 17, 1940, when he was captured by the soviets. The NKWD forced Żubryd to serve as an informant for them however after Germany invade the Soviet Union in 1941, he started serving in the Polish Home army. When the Red Army returned to Sanok in 1944, Żubryd reported to the Soviets that he wanted to continue serving them. Soon afterwards he was advanced to the rank of a lieutenant and worked in the Ministry of Public Security of Poland as an interrogator in Sanok. However, as an interrogator, he was different from this co-workers since he never tortured the arrestees and in fact warned them of any future arrests. In 1945,Żubryd decided to no longer serve the communist regime and he contacted the anti-communist partisans and formed a partisan group that grew to the size of a battalion.Żubryd was active in the Brzozów and Sanok regions where his partisans would ambush and attack Ministry of Public Security of Poland officials, Milicja Obywatelska (MO) officials, and regional communist party officials. The communist authorities actively pursued Żubryd and they were able to capture and his son as well as his mother-in-law which they held hostage in order to lure in Żubryd. Żubryd was in the Haczów area when he heard this information. Immediately his partisans captured the commandant as well as the MO station in Haczów. After putting the prisoners in a nearby cellar, Żubryd the next day called the Sanok Ministry of Public Security of Poland (SB) office and demanded that in exchange for the release of his son and mother-in-law, he would not harm the prisoners. The SB agreed to the exchange and release their hostages while Żubryd released his prisoners. This daring action angered the SB who were now more determined to capture Żubryd. Żubryd was eventually betrayed by his personal bodyguard who switched sides and started working as an agent for the SB. One day the agent along with Żubryd went out to survey the region near Malinówka, he murdered Żubryd with a shot to the head from behind. Moments later he led Żubryd's wife on the same trail and murdered her in a similar fashion. Currently in Żubryd's memory there is a cross with a memorial plaque that is located in the forest near the village of Malinówka.

=== After World War II ===
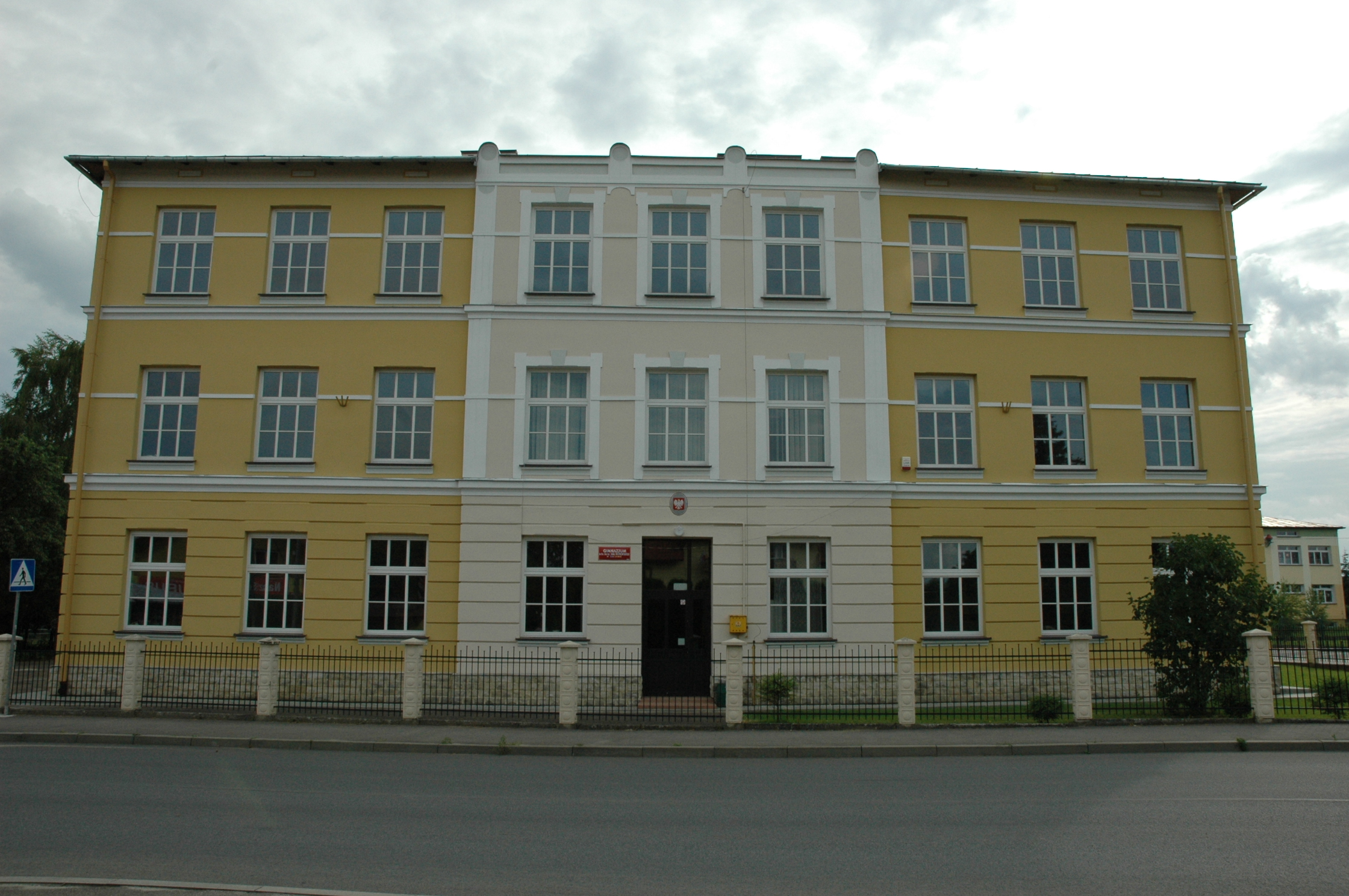
Gymnasiumin in Haczów

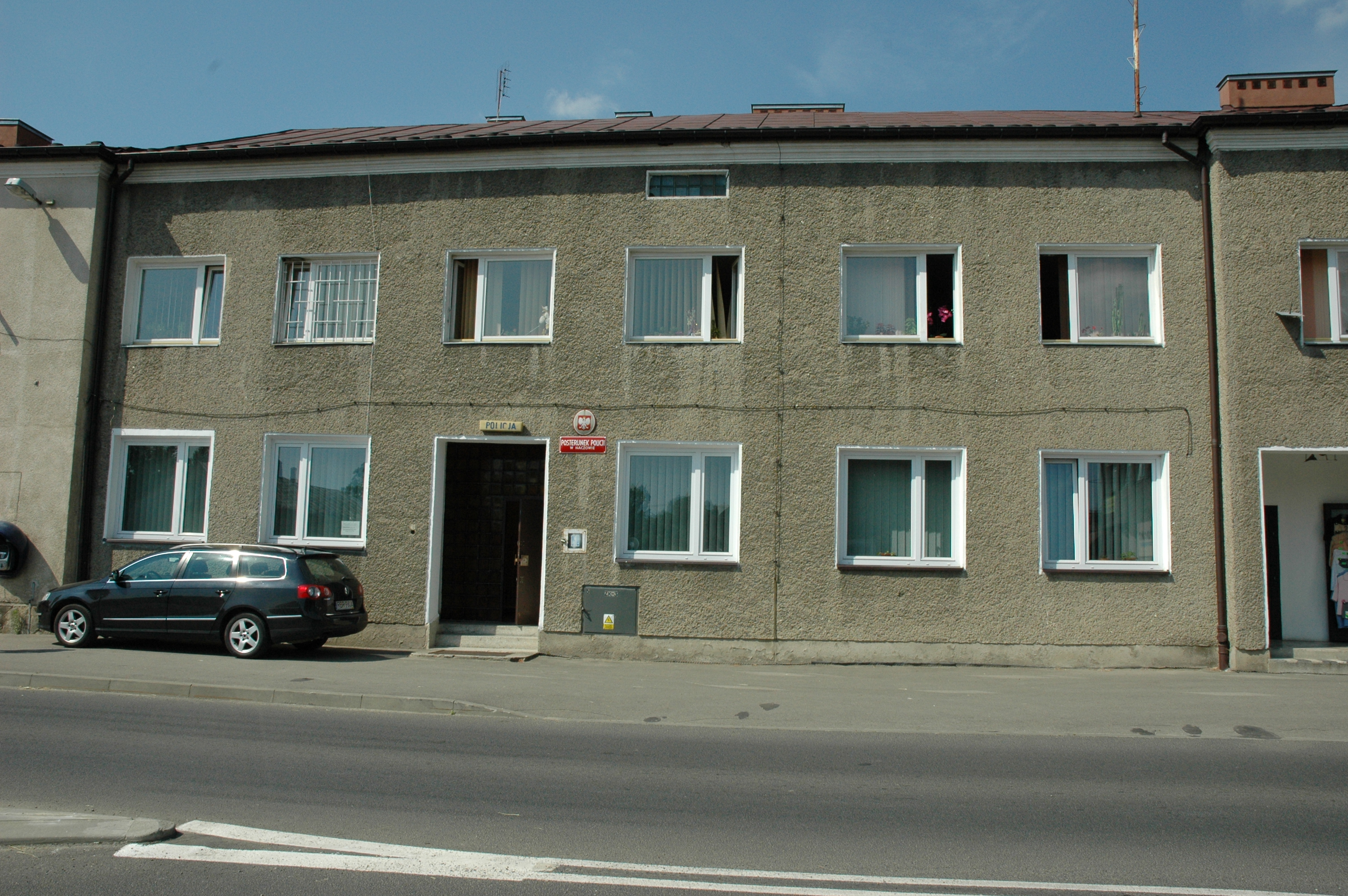
Police Station

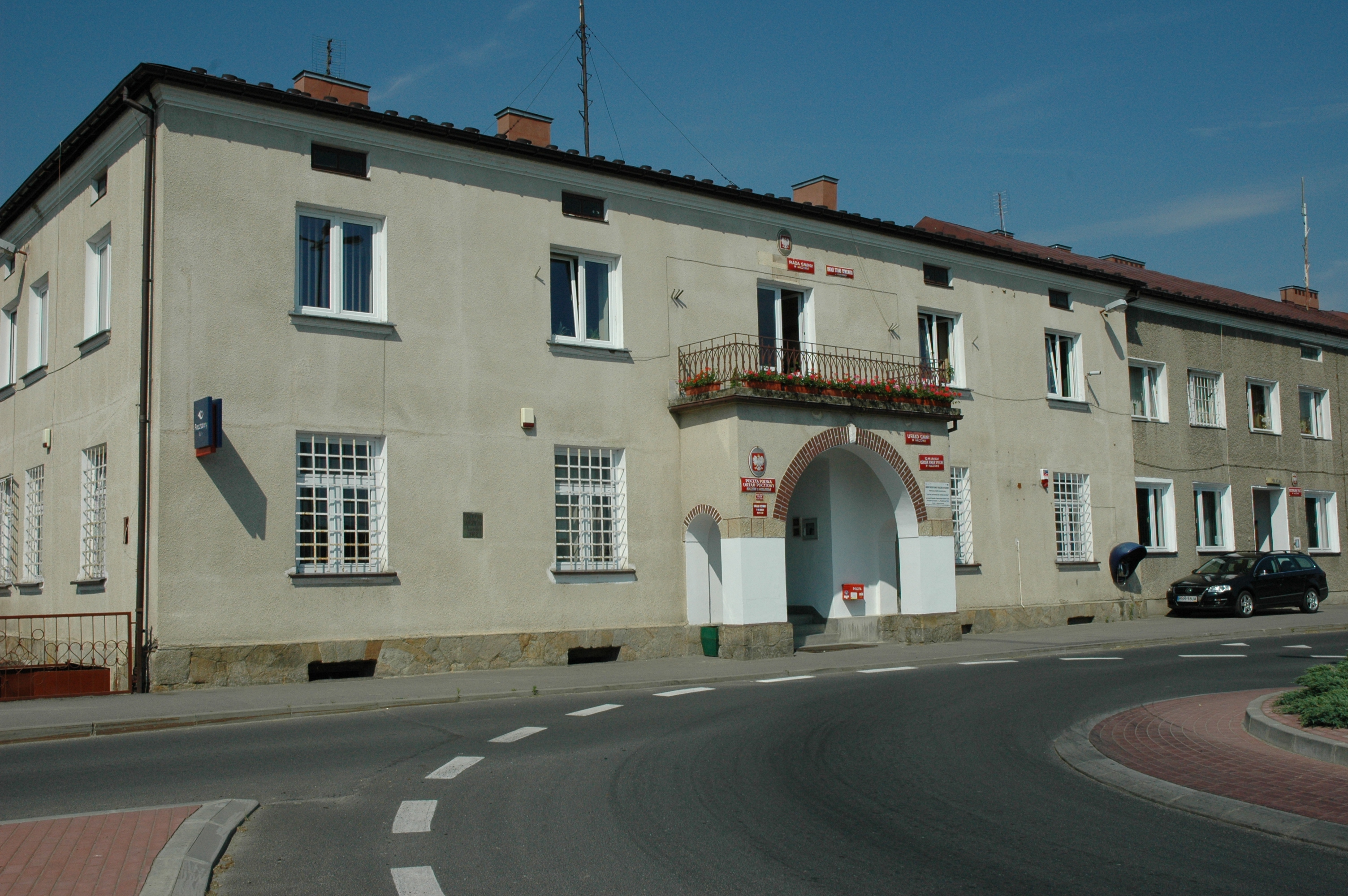
Administrative Office of Gmina Haczów

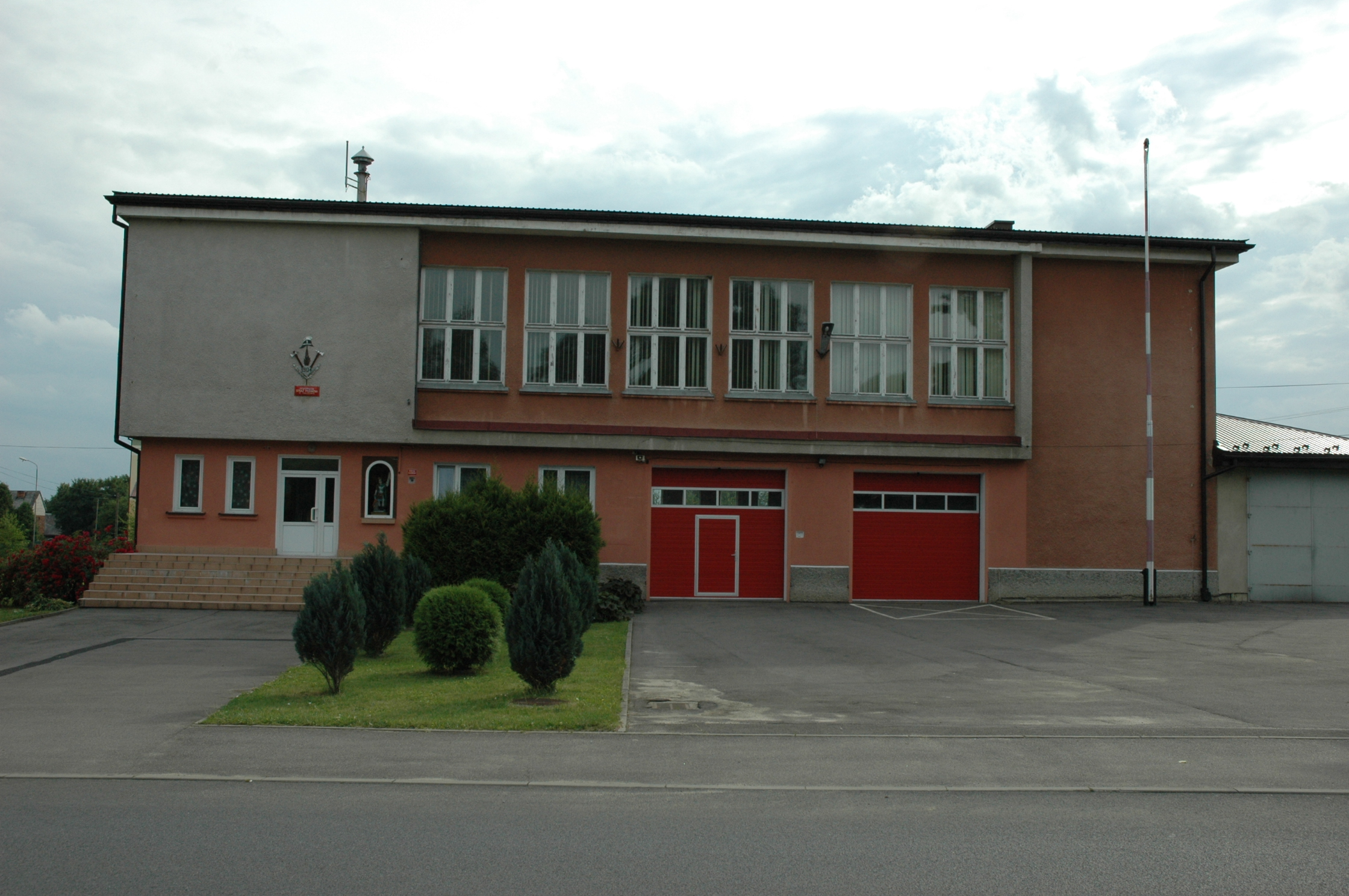
Fire Station in Haczów

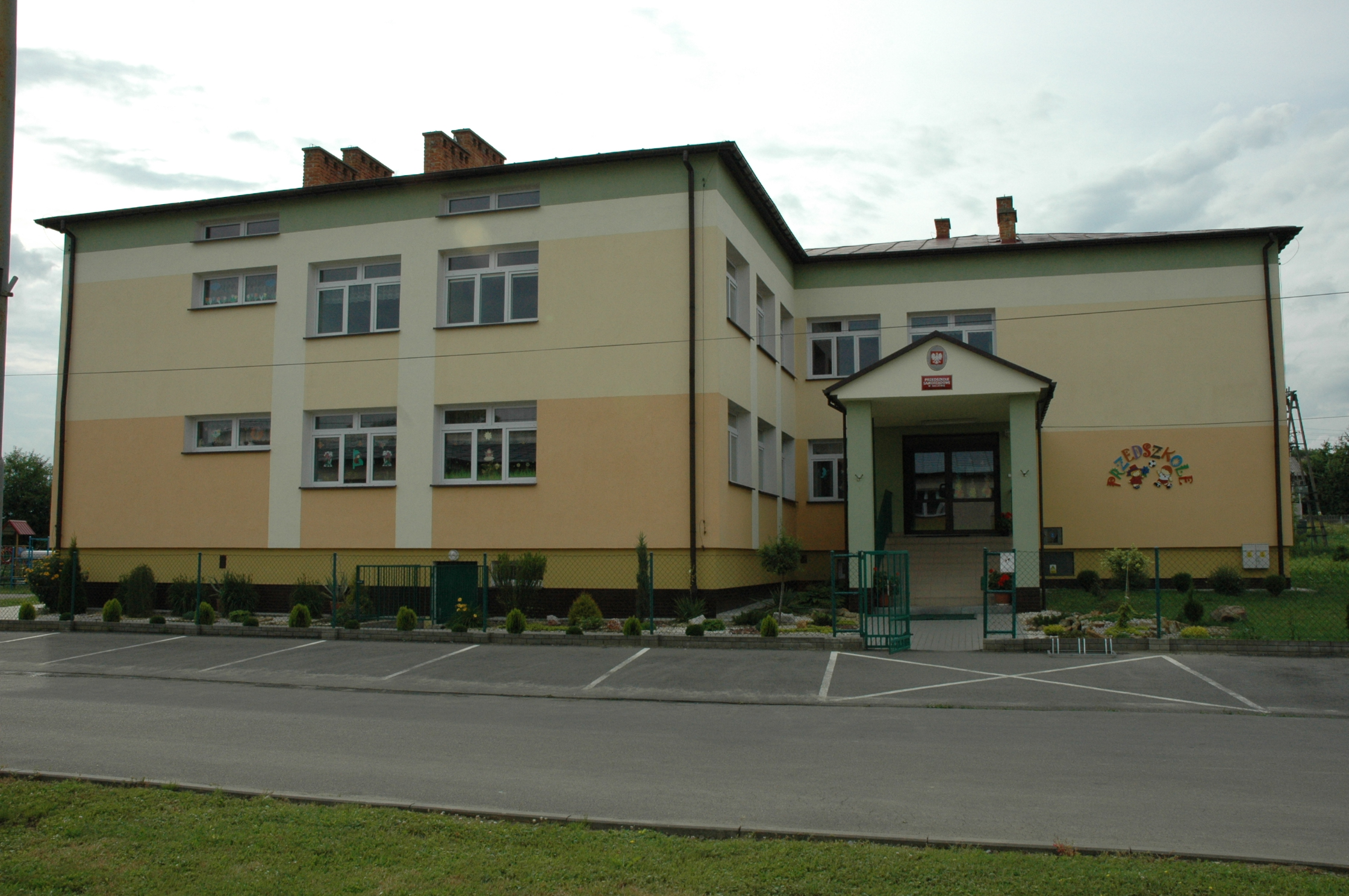
Preschool in Haczów

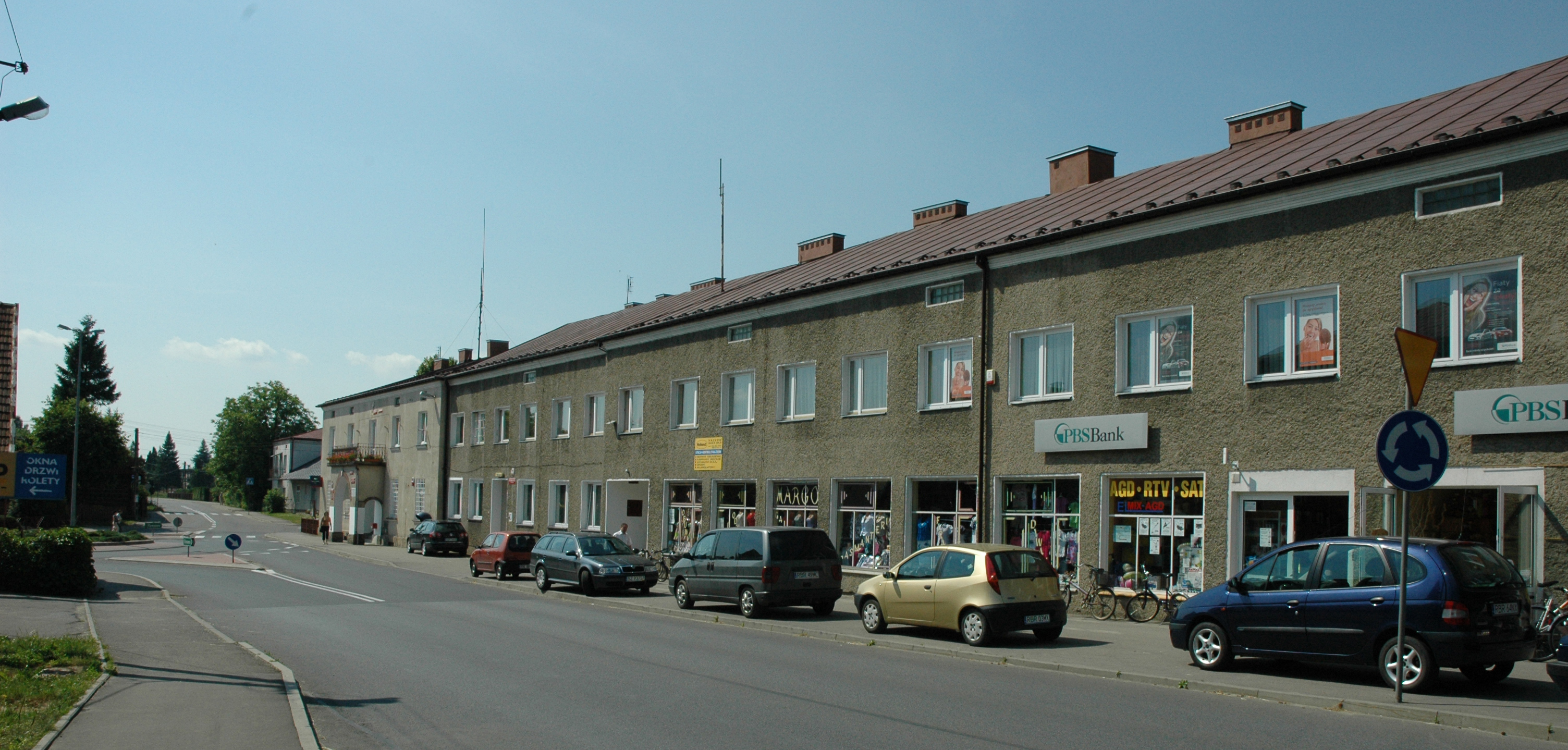
Street in Haczów

After the war Haczów started to rebuild itself and again the village started to grow. Through many investments, the following advancements were made to modernize the village:

- 1958 - 1963 - 1000 hectares were drained on the southern side of the village which were given for agricultural use.
- 1960 - Veterinary services are offered to the farmers.
- 1962 - 1963 - Street lights are introduced to the village center, and an office building, a bakery as well as a GC warehouse is built.
- 1964 - 1969 - The elementary school is rebuilt and modernized.
- 1964 -The village is hooked up to receive natural gas in order to heat homes and to cook.
- 1966 - The top portion of the fire station is given to public use.
- 1970 - A health clinic is built.
- 1971 - 1982 - The director of the Gmina is a Haczowian named Kazimierz Węgrzyn who is able to find the resources to invest into many local projects for the benefit of Haczów.
- 1976 - The Communal Center for Culture and for Leisure is built.
- 1976 - 1977 - The church rectory is rebuilt.
- 1978 - A GS general store as well as a school store is built.
- 1979 - Additional add-ons to the elementary school are finished and the company "Friends of Haczów " building is built
- 1981 - A sewing/clothing factory is built in Haczów which employees many of the local women.
- 1983 - The parish house is opened.
- 1990 - The entire village is now hooked up to the telephone wires and over 100 new telephones are added.
- 1990 - 1995 - The village now has a sewage treatment.
- 2000 - The Church of the Assumption of Holy Mary and St. Michael's Archangel, is added to the UNESCO world heritage list.
- 2002 - 2003 - The manor house is being rebuilt and modernized.

== Culture ==
=== Cultural and Leisure Center ===
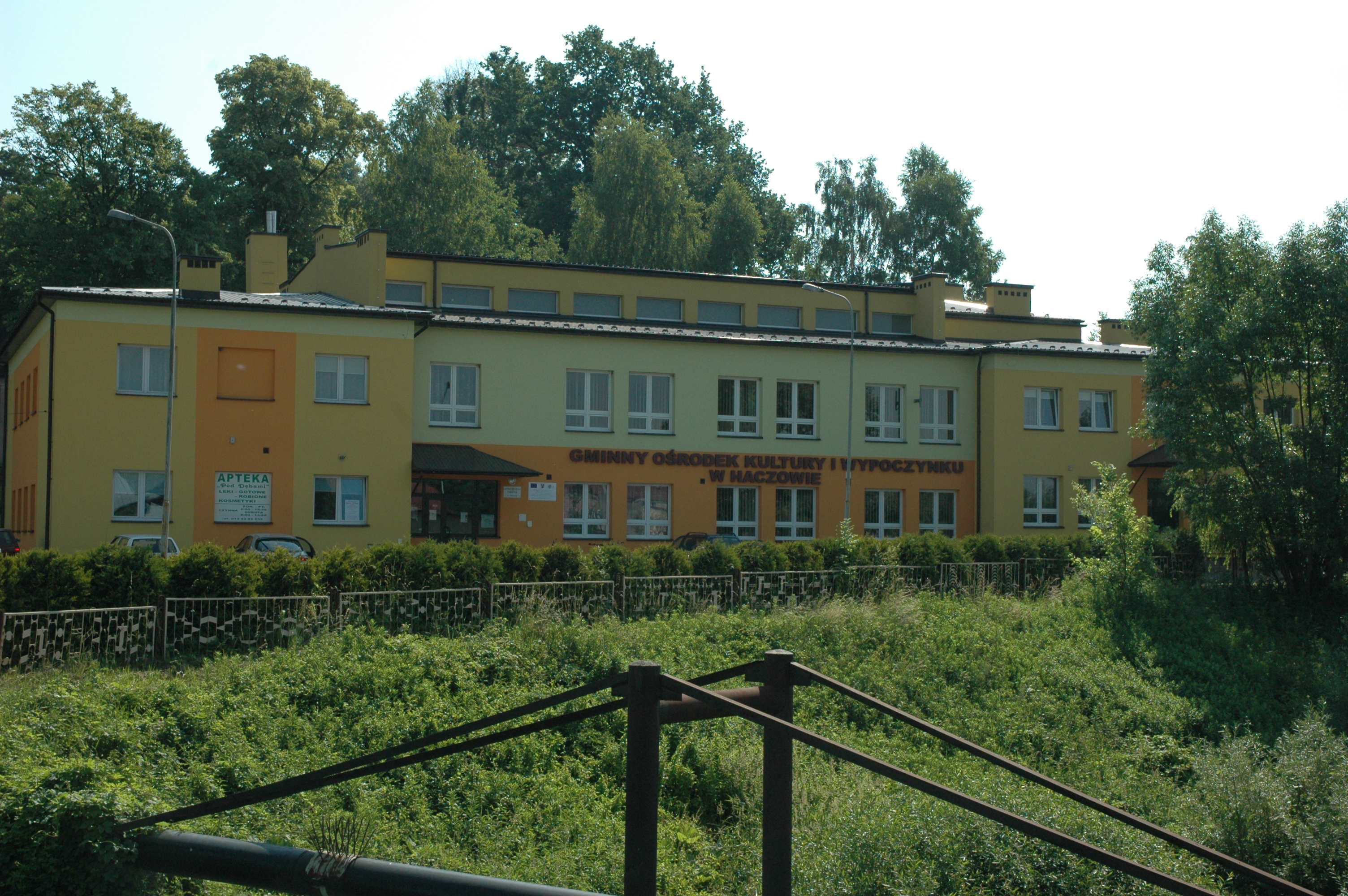
Cultural and Leisure Center, and library

The Cultural and Leisure Center was built in 1976 and is located adjacent to the manor-house complex in the center of Haczów. The building provides many rooms that are used by the local groups as well as the public library and pharmacy. The mission of the center is primary focused on providing for the cultural and entertainment needs of the residents of Haczów as well as of Gmina Haczów. This includes the following:

- Working with the local schools in organizing educational programs, concerts, and theater spectacles for the local students.
- Conducting and organizing courses, meetings, and workshops on handcrafts such as weaving and traditional Haczowian embroidery. Also the center leads educational courses in the field of art and music for those who are interested.
- Organization of concerts with amateur, professional and folk musical groups as well as organizing festivals, fairs, and other activities for the entertainment of local residents.
- Providing locals with a gym for working out (since 2005 )
- Maintaining a mini-museum which is called the "Hall of Tradition" which exhibits local folk costumes, traditional handcrafted pieces as well as pieces of art made by local artists. The exhibit was opened in 2005 after the entire center underwent a total remodeling.

=== Folk Group - "Haczowskie Wesele" (Haczowian Wedding) ===
One of Haczów's most well known cultural groups is the group "Haczowskie Wesele" which portrays the theater piece of Haczowian Wedding written by Stanisław Wysocki. Wysocki was the director of the Folk theater and choir in Haczów from 1934 to 1965, as well as a member of the Board of the Union of Folk theaters and choirs in Lwów from 1935 to 1939. On one of the Board meetings in 1936, Wysocki was asked to create a production from the Haczów region for the 1937 Polish Lowlands Festival of Song and Dance. Wysocki decided to portray a traditional Haczowian wedding from the late 19th century. He quickly researched old customs, traditions, and songs from the 1880s. The music accompanying the production was written by Bronisław Kaszowski.

The premier of the theatrical piece took place on May 3, 1937, in Haczów before the departure to the Festival in Kraków. In the festival, the group received one of two awards for the restoration of a great temperament of a wedding ceremony and it was a crowd favorite.

Following the successful debut, an additional two pieces were added. The act named "Courtship" (Zaloty) was written in 1938, and the act named "Making Wreaths" (Robienie Wianków) in 1961. The entire piece was performed at the 600th anniversary of the founding of Haczów. Up until 1939, "Haczowskie Wesele" was performed 19 times in cities such as Kraków, Lwów, Przemyśl, and Rzeszów.

After a six-year break due to World War II, the group was reactivated in 1945 when it received the Governor of Rzeszów award for the Theater, Choir and Dancing Festival. The group continued to actively perform the piece and from 1945 to 1968, they performed it ninety times and had a total of 105 actor who took part during this time. The group took part in national festivals in Lublin in 1955, in Warsaw in 1955 and in 1963, and in a television filming in Łódź in 1963.

Wysocki died on December 21, 1968. After his death, the director of the group became Bożena Antosz. Most recently in 2003, the group participated in the VII Festival of Wedding Ceremonies "European Wedding Feast" in Węgrów. There the group received the "Boryny" award for 1st place in the category of a group presenting an authentic folk tradition. The group continues to actively take part in many festivals.

=== Concert Band "Hejnał" ===
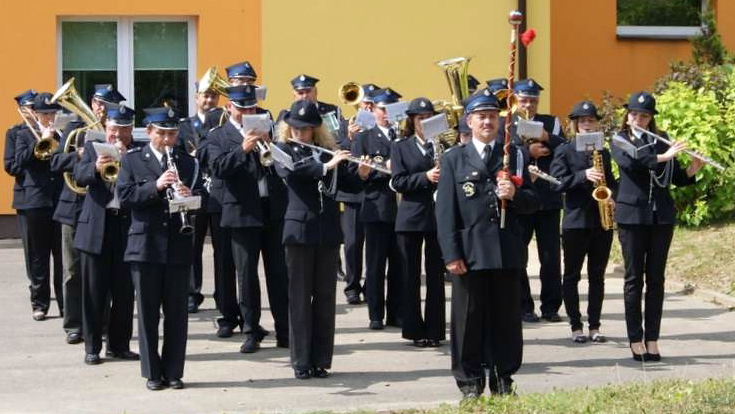
Concert Band Hejnał

In 1901 for the first time in Haczów, an instrumental duet (consisting of Andrzej and Stanisław Kaszowski who were accompanied by Stanisław Ruszel on the church organs) played for the Easter mass. This small musical presentation lead to the investment of fr. Józef Foryś for the purchase of musical instruments for the band which now became a permanent part of Haczowian culture. The band practiced at the church and the first bandmaster from 1901 to 1920,(excluding the war years of 1914–1919), was Stanisław Kaszowski. He was later succeeded by Michał Szuber and Bronisław Kaszowski. Bronisław Kaszowski left for America in 1927, however when he returned, he finished in 1934 the Musical School in Częstochowa and in 1935 resumed his position as the bandmaster. From that time up until the start of World War II, the band had a total of 29 musicians.

It took ten years for the band to become reactivated and in 1949, Bronisław Kaszowski organized a new band consisting of 40 musicians. This particular band had multiple successes which included 1st place in the Festival of Concert Bands in Krosno in 1951, 1st place in the County in 1954, and in 1955 taking part in the Voivodeship Festival of Concert Bands in Rzeszów. In 1962, due to arguments between the band, local government, and church, the band ceased to exist for the next seven years.

In 1969, the band was once again reactivated by Kazimierz Węgrzyn who assured the band the necessary funds and place to practice. The new bandmaster became Władysław Boczar, a student of the previous bandmaster Bronisław Kaszowski. The band continued to take an active role in local festivals. In 1971, the Voivodeship Union of Volunteer Firefighters in Rzeszów became interested in the band and started o provide the needed finances, instruments, as well as uniforms. The band started taking part in many firefighting festivals. The following year, 1972, they qualified for the Inter-Voivodeship Contest for Concert Bands of the Firefighting Units of Southeastern Poland in Lublin, where they received 2nd place. In 1977 they also received 2nd place in the VII Contest for Concert Bands in Łańcut as well as entering the elimination rounds for the national contest in Koszalin.

During the 1980s, the patron of the band became the Haczów Cultural and Leisure Center which is to the present day. The concert band from its existence in 1901 continued to play on all religious and national holidays in Haczów. They also played for Pope John Paul II in Rzeszów in 1991 and in Krosno in 1997 when the Pope crowned the Lady of Sorrows of Haczów. During the 1990s the band had 35 active members as well as 14 students. In 1999 the band recorded 16 musical pieces in the Studio of Polish Radio in Rzeszów and in 2000, they received 5th place in the Inter-Voivodeship Contest of Concert Bands in Kolbuszowa. The following year, 2001, the band celebrated its centennial anniversary and it is still currently led by Władysław Boczar who now is in charge of 40 members and 7 students. The band continues to actively take part in festivals, holidays, and concerts today.

=== Haczowian Kapela ===
More recently, the Haczowian Kapela musical group specializing in local folk songs started in November 2008. It currently has ten active members.

== Points of interest ==
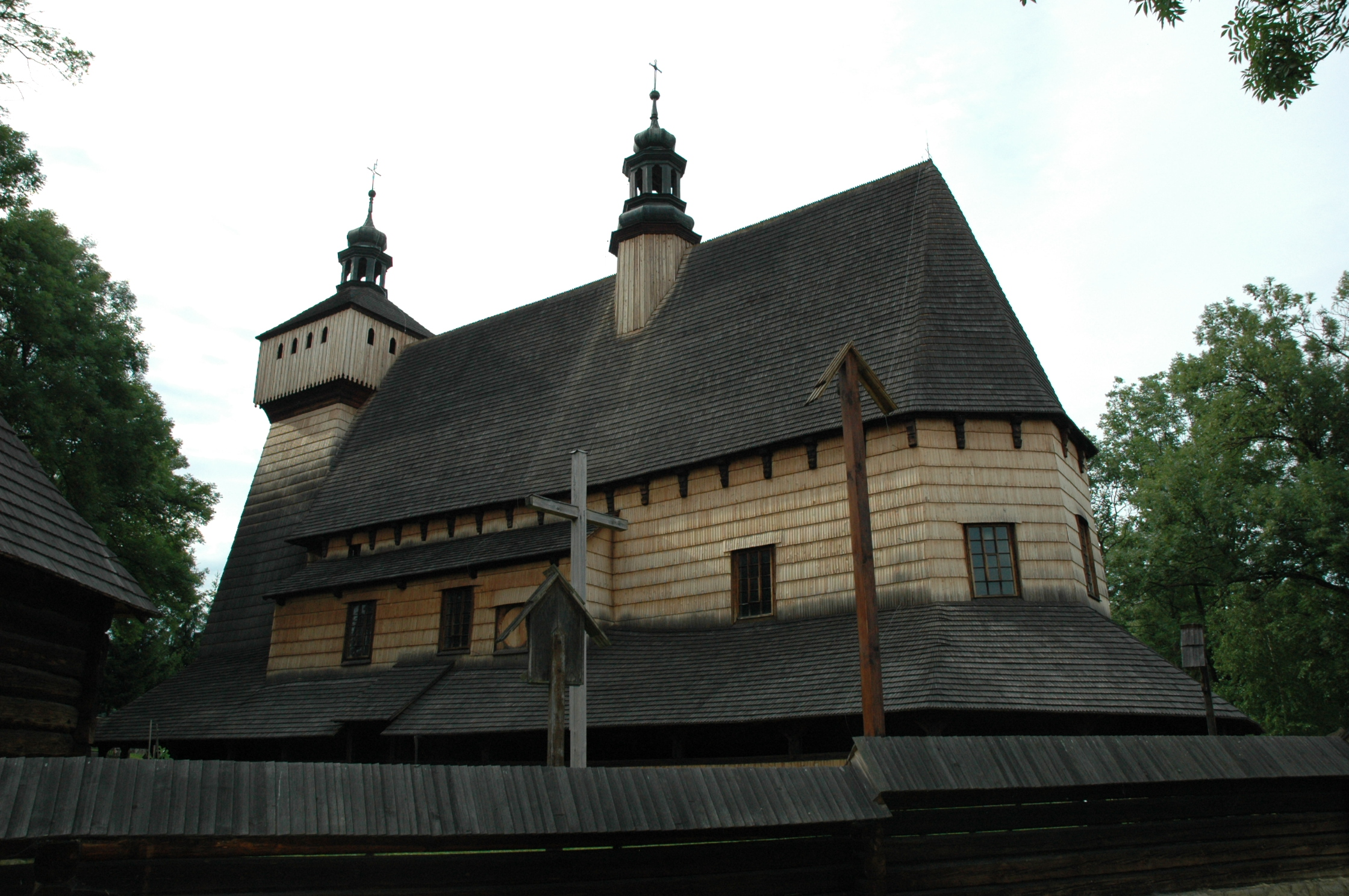
Church of the Assumption of Holy Mary in Haczów - UNESCO Site

- The Church of the Assumption of the Blessed Virgin Mary - A wooden Gothic church built in the late 14th century. The church interior is decorated with a polychrome dated from 1494, which was discovered in 1956 during the restoration works. In the 17th century, a Baroque tower was added to the existing church structure. It is the largest Gothic wooden church in Europe and also the oldest wooden church in Poland. In 1948, the services were moved to a new church which was built shortly before World War II. In 2003 the church along with the church in Blizne, and many other historical wooden churches of Little Poland were placed on the UNESCO list of world heritage site.
- Former manor house complex
- Chapel from 1820
- Monument dedicated to the fallen of 1914- 1920 and 1939–1945
- The graves of the Urbańskis, who were the longtime owners of Haczów

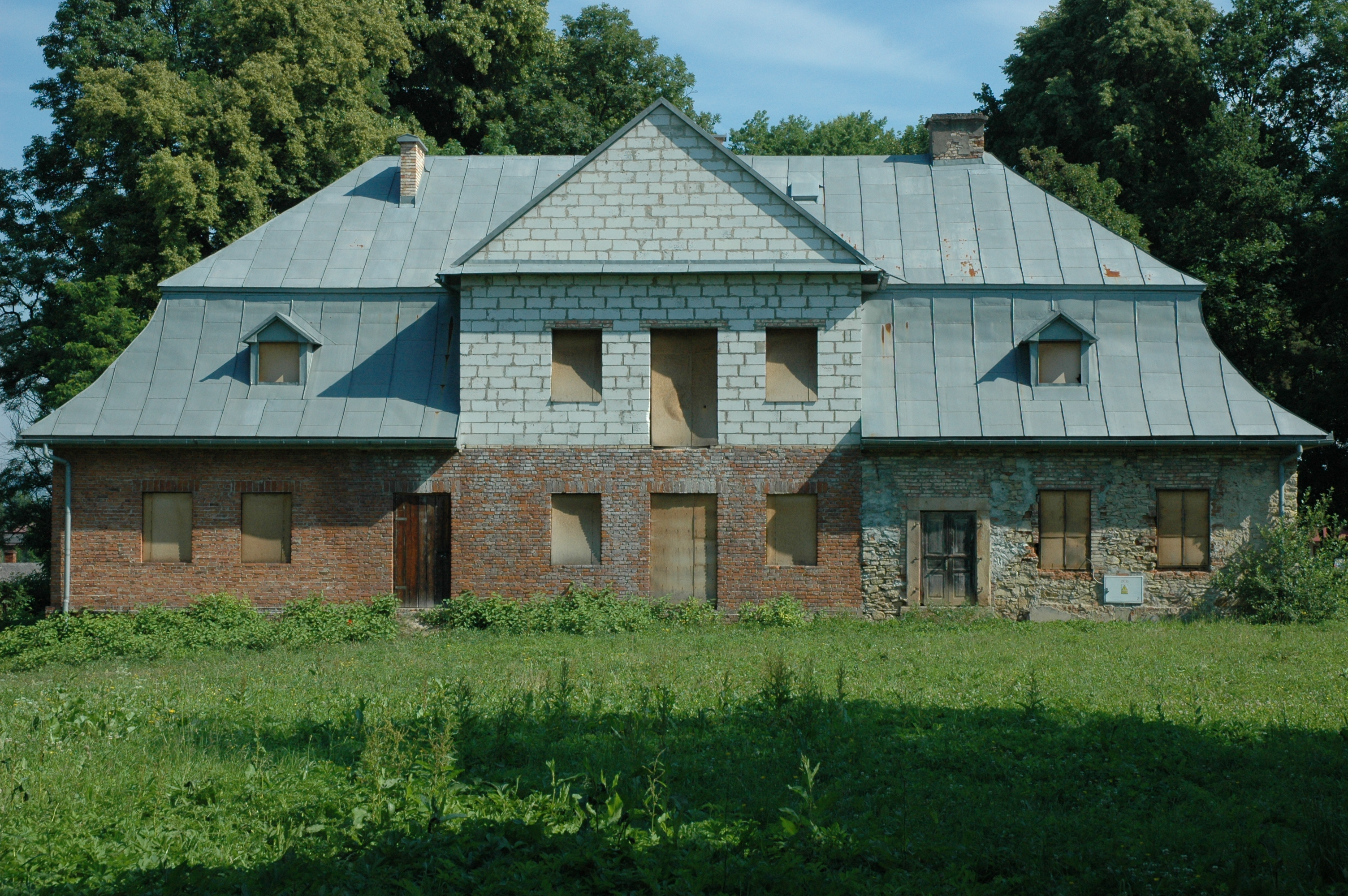
Former Manor House

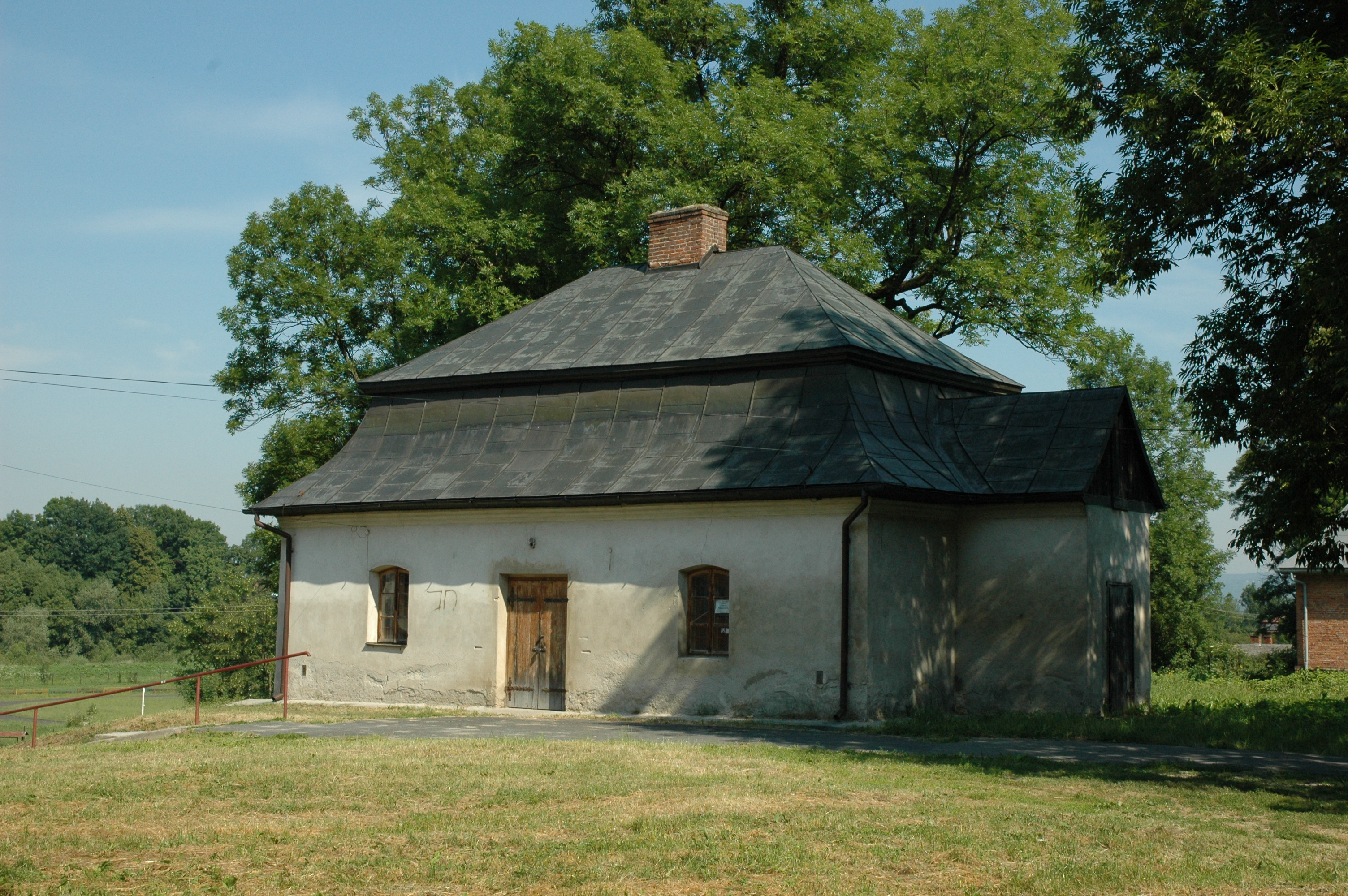
Servants quarters

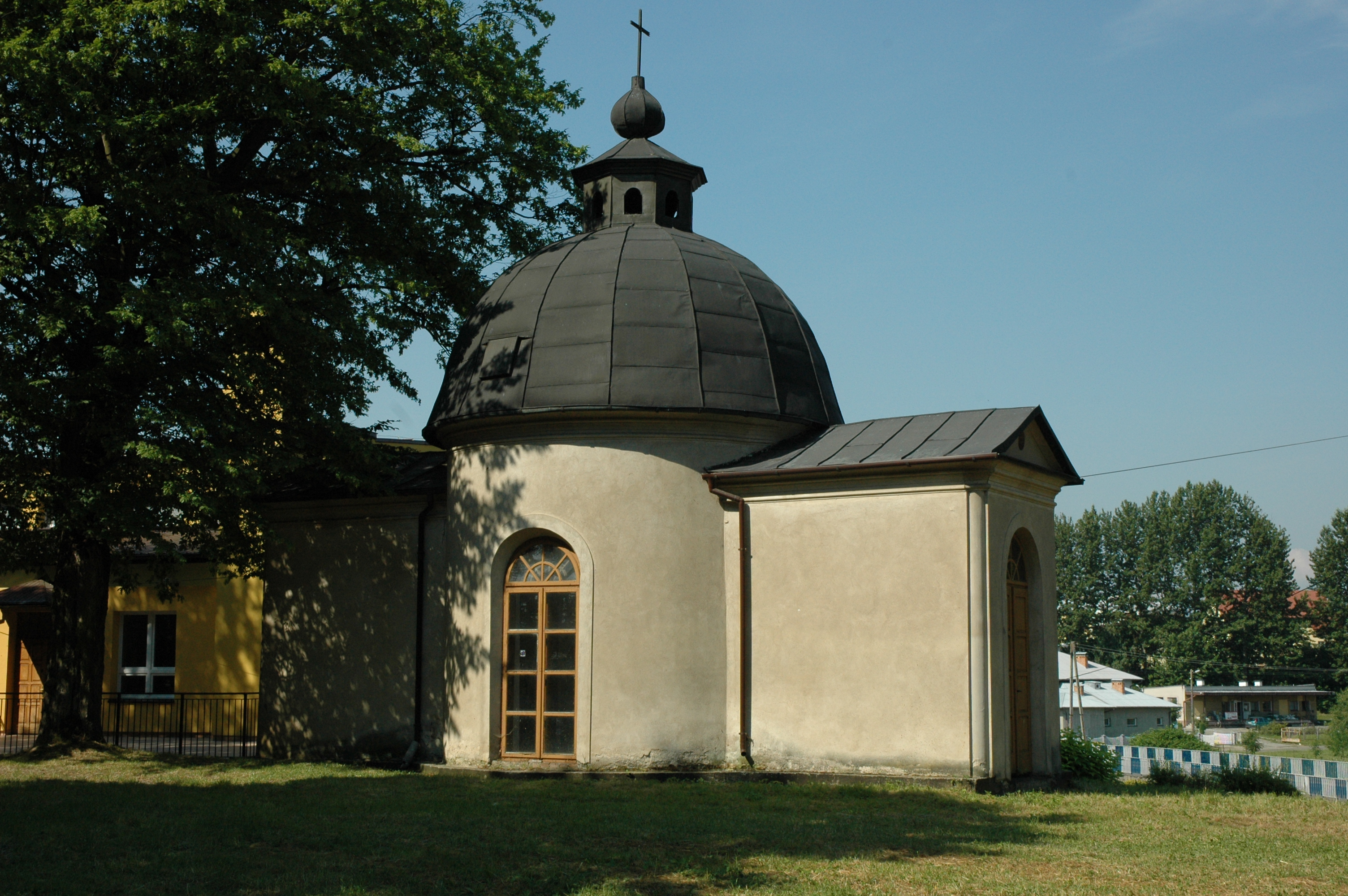
Chapel

== See also ==
- Brzozów
- Gmina Haczów
- Turze Pole
- Lendians
- Great Moravia
- Ostsiedlung
- Walddeutsche
- Pogorzans
