= Wrocanka, Gmina Miejsce Piastowe =

Wrocanka
- Village
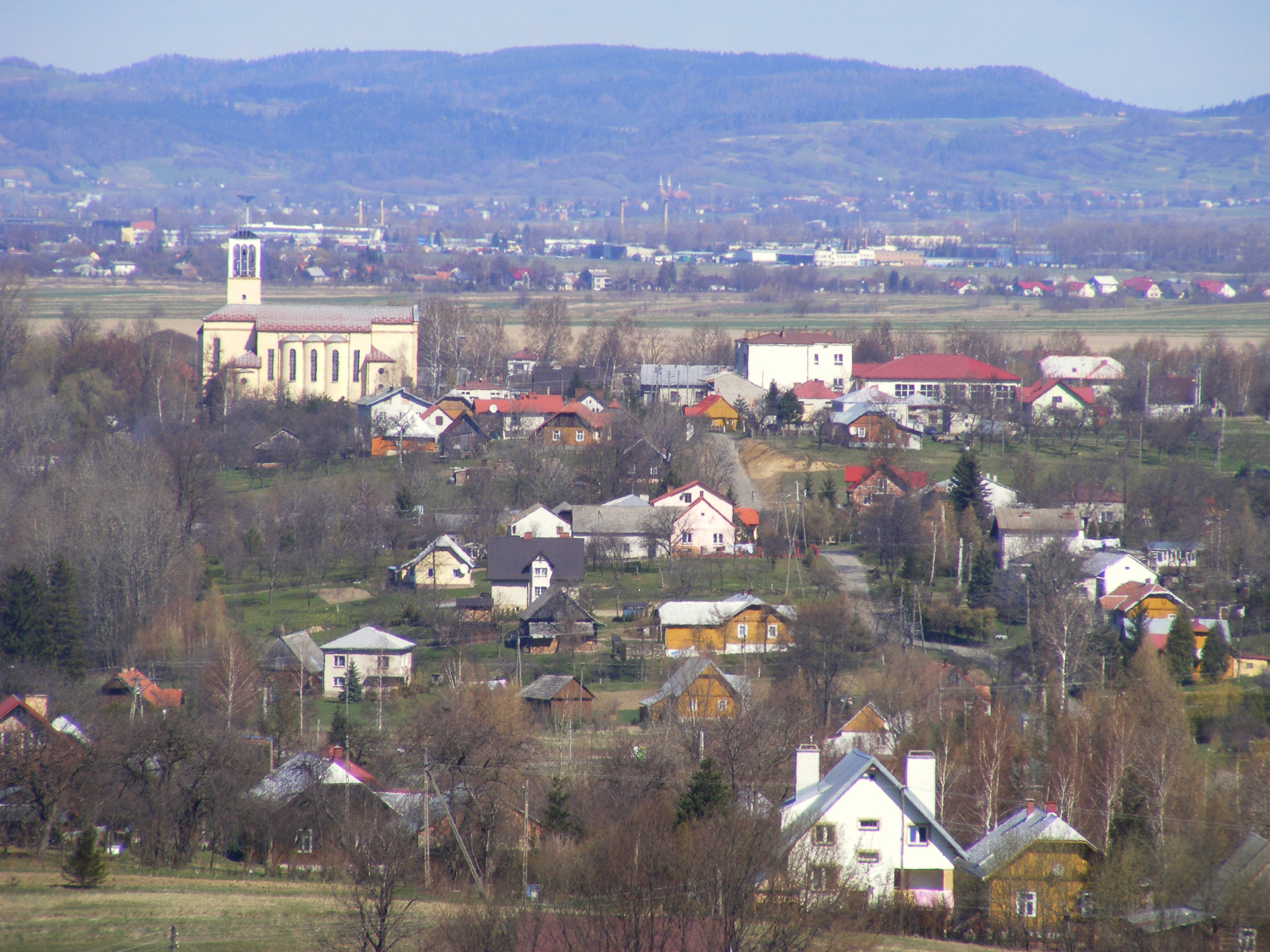
- Wrocanka, upper

- Location within Poland
- Coordinates: 49°38′15″N 21°44′45″E
- Country: Poland
- Voivodeship: Subcarpathian
- County: Krosno
- Gmina: Miejsce Piastowe
- Population: 1,200

Wrocanka [vrɔˈt͡saŋka] is a village in the administrative district of Gmina Miejsce Piastowe, within Krosno County, Subcarpathian Voivodeship, in south-eastern Poland.
