= Assumption of Holy Mary Church, Haczów =

Coordinates: 49.6703°N 21.89°E

Assumption of Holy Mary Church in Haczów
- Kościół Wniebowzięcia Najświętszej Maryi Panny w Haczowie
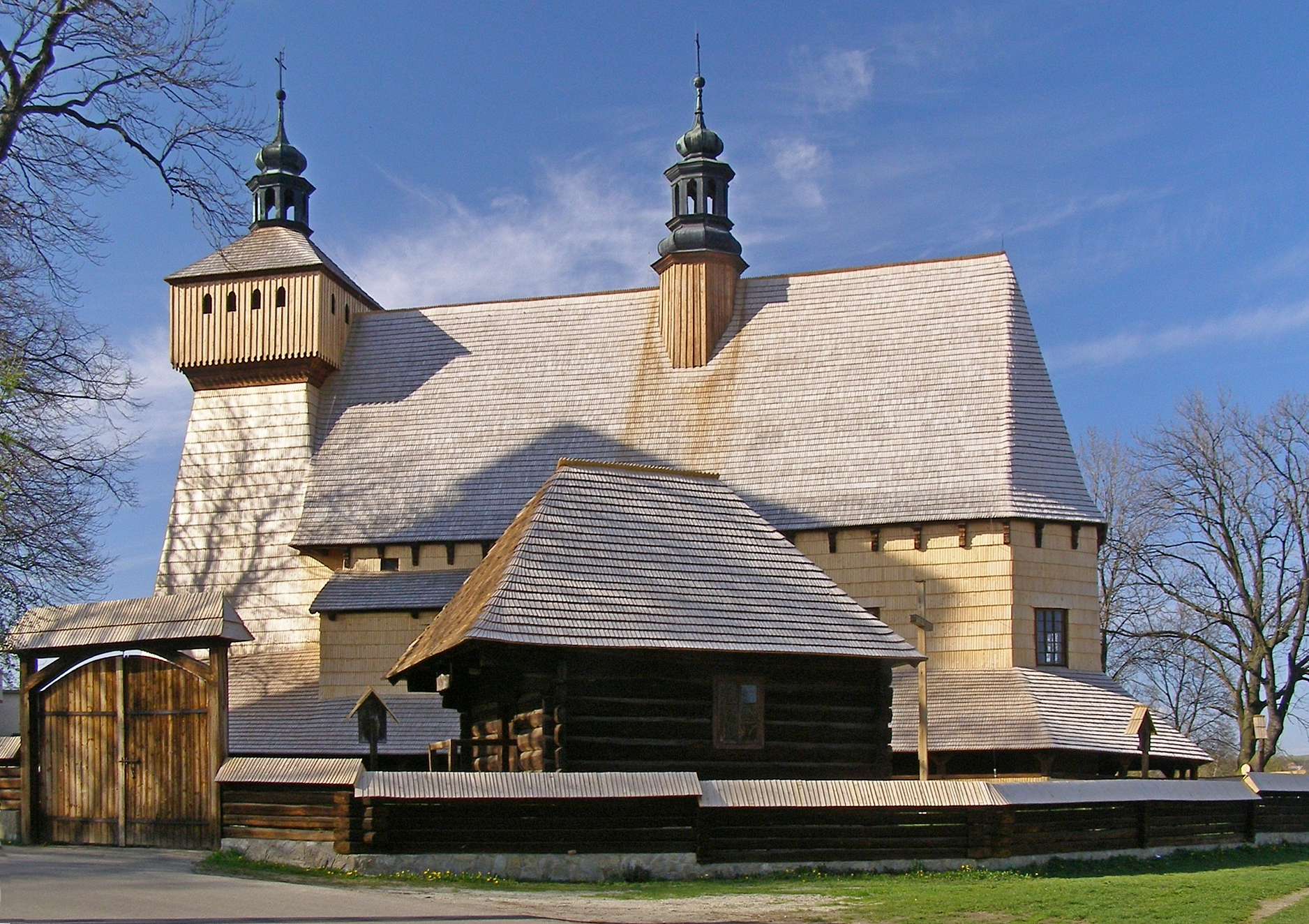
- Assumption of Holy Mary Church in Haczów
- Address: Haczów
- Country: Poland
- Denomination: Roman Catholic Church

History
- Status: active church

Architecture
- Style: Gothic
- Completed: after 1459

UNESCO World Heritage Site
- Part of: Wooden Churches of Southern Małopolska
- Criteria: Cultural: (iii), (iv)
- Reference: 1053-004
- Inscription: 2003 (27th Session)

Assumption of Holy Mary Church in Haczów - a Gothic, wooden church located in the village of Haczów from the fifteenth-century, which together with different churches is designated as part of the UNESCO Wooden Churches of Southern Lesser Poland. The church in Haczów is the largest wooden Gothic church in Europe, and simultaneously one of the oldest wooden framework churches in Poland.

== History ==
The wooden church in Haczów was built out of a wooden framework, raised after 1459, and expanded in 1624 (with the building of the 25 metre starling tower, built away from the church, topped out with a cupola, pl:soboty (low wooden arcade around the church supported by pillars), the creation of windows in the nave, and the building of an earth bulwark); between 1784 and 1789 (expansion of the sacristy, building of new soboty). The interior of the church is decorated with a polychrome from 1494 (most likely the oldest polychrome of its type in Europe, representing the oldest collection of representative paintings in Poland), and later expanded in 1864.
