= Gmina Miejsce Piastowe =

Gmina Miejsce Piastowe Miejsce Piastowe Commune
- Gmina
- Flag Coat of arms
- Interactive map of Gmina Miejsce Piastowe
- Coordinates (Miejsce Piastowe): 49°38′N 21°47′E
- Country: Poland
- Voivodeship: Subcarpathian
- County: Krosno County
- Seat: Miejsce Piastowe

Area
  - Total: 51.46 km^{2} (19.87 sq mi)

Population (2020)
  - Total: 13 640
  - Density: 0.25/km^{2} (0.65/sq mi)
- Website: http://www.miejscepiastowe.pl

Gmina Miejsce Piastowe is a rural gmina (administrative district) in Krosno County, Subcarpathian Voivodeship, in south-eastern Poland. Its seat is the village of Miejsce Piastowe, which lies approximately 7 kilometres (4 mi) south-east of Krosno and 48 km (30 mi) south of the regional capital Rzeszów. The current mayor Wiktor Skwara was elected in 2024.

The gmina covers an area of 51.46 square kilometres (19.9 sq mi), and as of 2020 its total population is 13,640.

== Villages ==
Gmina Miejsce Piastowe contains the villages and settlements of Głowienka, Łężany, Miejsce Piastowe, Niżna Łąka, Rogi, Targowiska, Widacz, Wrocanka and Zalesie.

== Neighbouring gminas ==
Gmina Miejsce Piastowe is bordered by the city of Krosno and by the gminas of Chorkówka, Dukla, Haczów, Iwonicz-Zdrój, Krościenko Wyżne and Rymanów.
