= Rogi, Podkarpackie Voivodeship =

Rogi
- Village
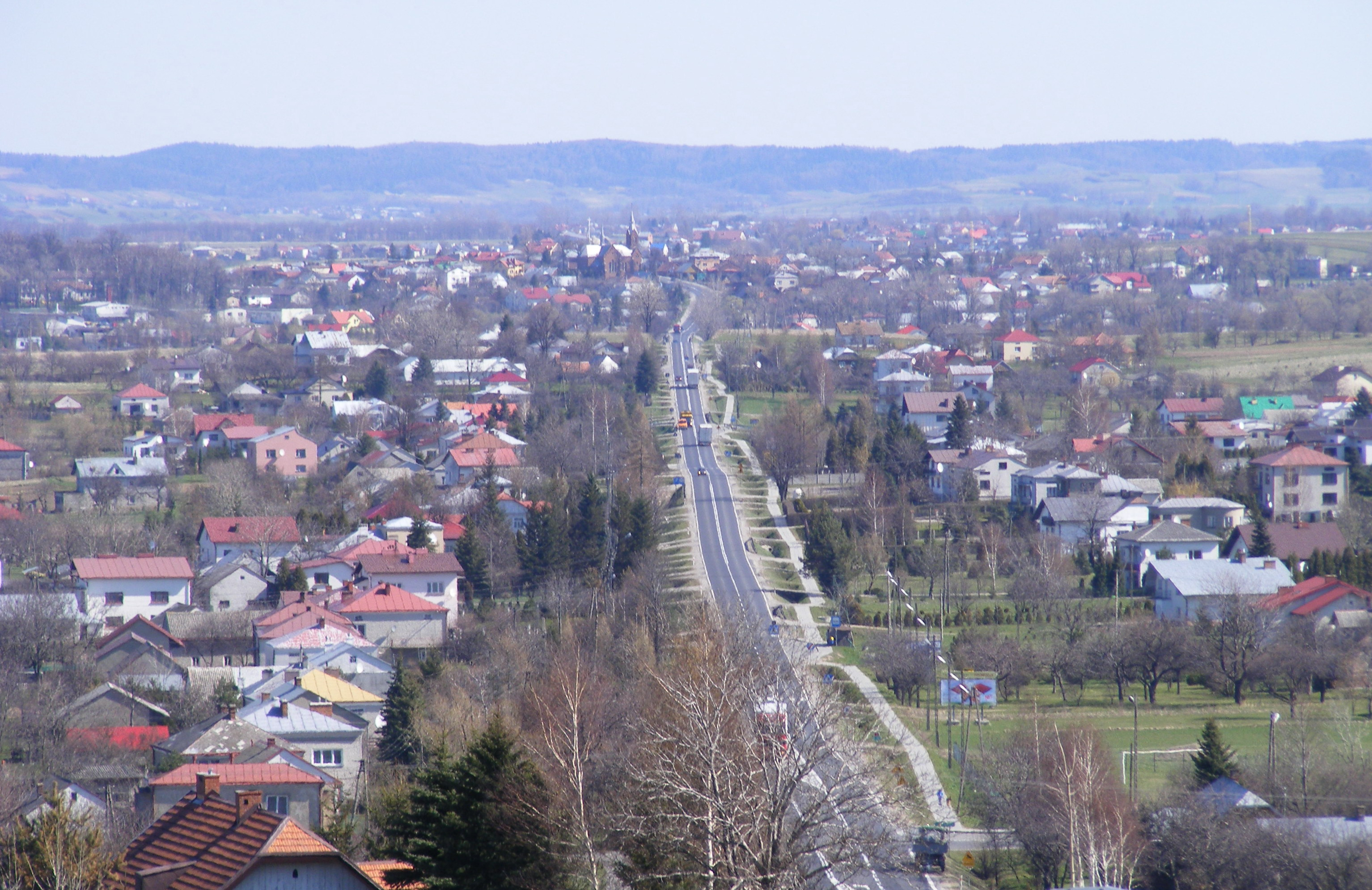
- Rogi village

- Location within Poland
- Coordinates: 49°36′50″N 21°45′32″E
- Country: Poland
- Voivodeship: Subcarpathian
- County: Krosno
- Gmina: Miejsce Piastowe
- Population (approx.): 2,500

Rogi [ˈrɔɡi] is a village in the administrative district of Gmina Miejsce Piastowe, within Krosno County, Subcarpathian Voivodeship, in south-eastern Poland.
