= Zalesie, Gmina Miejsce Piastowe =

Zalesie
- Village
- Location within Poland
- Coordinates: 49°39′9″N 21°50′2″E
- Country: Poland
- Voivodeship: Subcarpathian
- County: Krosno
- Gmina: Miejsce Piastowe
- Population: 340

Zalesie [zaˈlɛɕɛ] is a village in the administrative district of Gmina Miejsce Piastowe, within Krosno County, Subcarpathian Voivodeship, in south-eastern Poland.
