= Walddeutsche =

Ethnic group

Walddeutsche; Głuchoniemcy
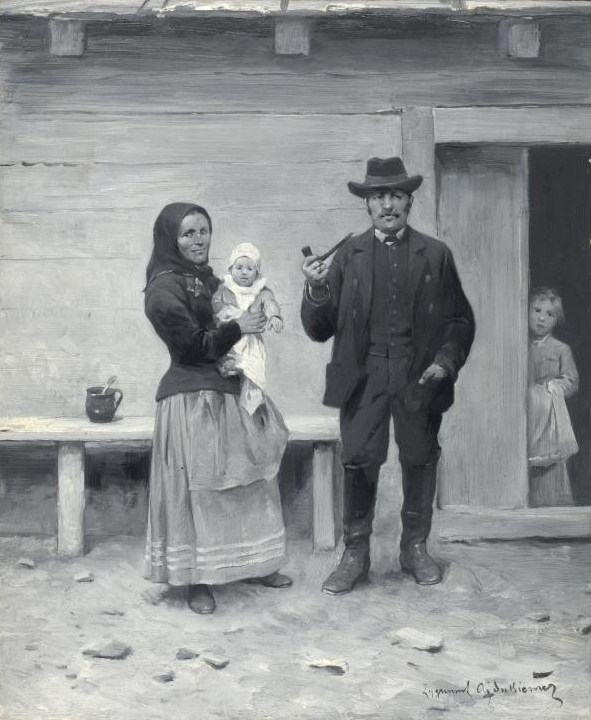
- A depiction of a Walddeutsche family by Zygmunt Ajdukiewicz

Languages
- Polish (Uplander dialect); Silesian German

Religion
- Roman Catholicism, Protestantism

Walddeutsche (lit. "Forest Germans" or Taubdeutsche – "Deaf Germans"; Polish: Głuchoniemcy – "deaf Germans") was the name for a group of German-speaking people, originally used in the 16th century for two language islands around Łańcut and Krosno, in southeastern Poland. Both of them were fully polonised before the 18th century, the term, however, survived up to the early 20th century as the designation na Głuchoniemcach, broadly and vaguely referring to the territory of present-day Sanockie Pits, which has seen a partial German settlement since the 14th century, mostly Slavicised long before the term was coined.

== Nomenclature ==
The term Walddeutsche – coined by the Polish historians Marcin Bielski (1531), Szymon Starowolski (1632), Bishop Ignacy Krasicki, and Wincenty Pol – also sometimes refers to Germans living between Wisłoka and the San River part of the West Carpathian Plateau and the Central Beskidian Piedmont in Poland.

The Polish term Głuchoniemcy is a sort of pun; it literally means "deaf Germans", but sounds similar to "deaf-mutes" (pl. głuchoniemi, sg. głuchoniemy): Niemcy, Polish for "Germans", is derived from niemy ("mute", unable to talk comprehensibly, i.e. in a Slavic language), and głuchy ("deaf", i.e. "unable to communicate") sounds similar to głusza meaning "wood".

== History ==
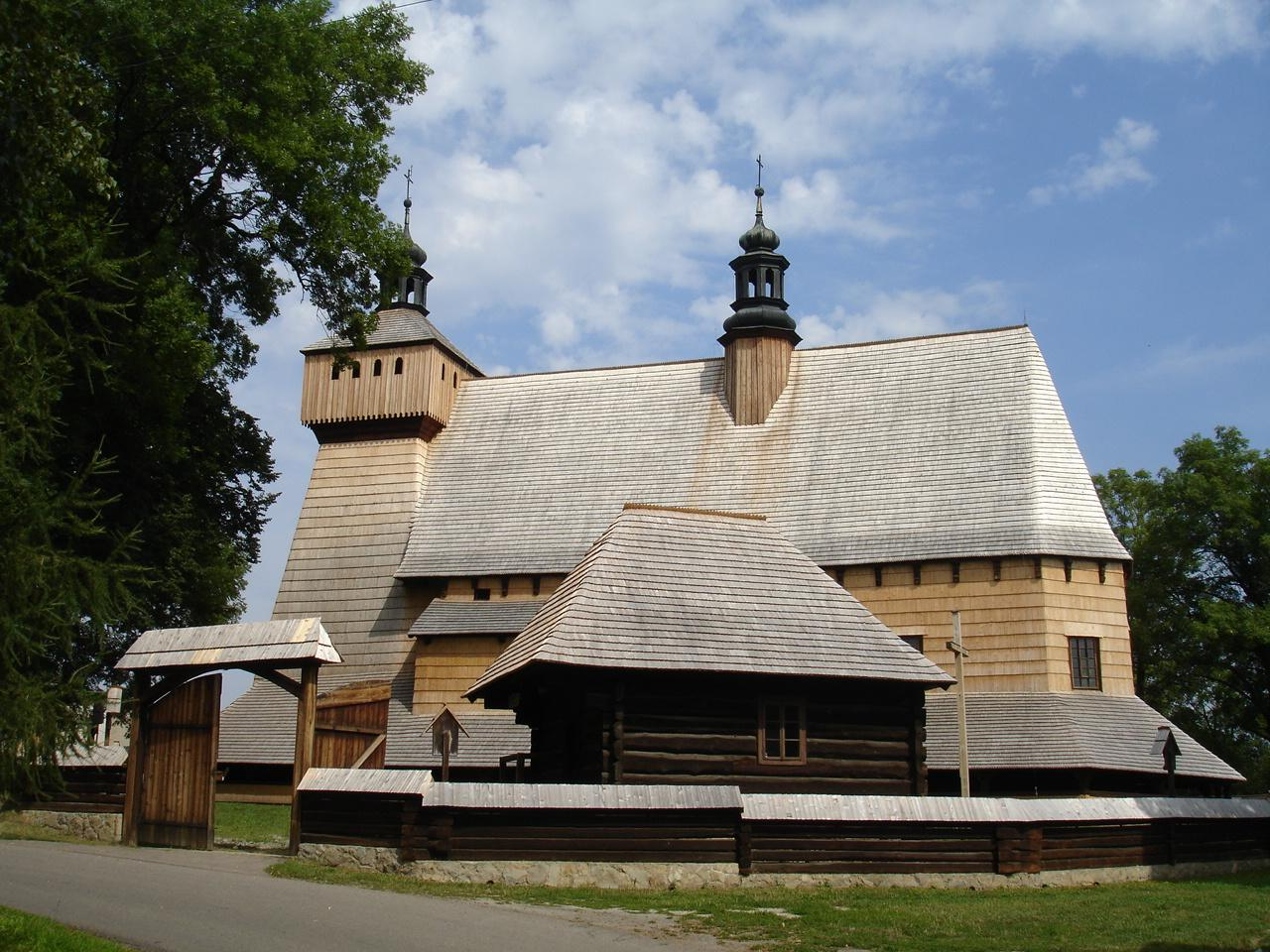
Haczów, one of the oldest wooden Gothic churches in Europe, 14th century, UNESCO World Heritage Site

In the 14th century a German settlement called Hanshof existed in the area. The Church of the Assumption of Holy Mary and St. Michael's Archangel in Haczów (Poland), the oldest wooden Gothic temple in Europe, was erected in the 14th century and was added to the UNESCO list of World Heritage Sites in 2003.

Germans settled in the territory of the Kingdom of Poland (territory of present-day Subcarpathian Voivodeship and eastern part of Lesser Poland) from the 14th to 16th centuries (see Ostsiedlung), mostly after the region returned to Polish sphere of influence in 1340, when Casimir III of Poland took the Czerwień towns.

Marcin Bielski states that Bolesław I Chrobry (967–1025) settled some Germans in the region to defend the borders against Hungary and Kievan Rus' but the arrivals were ill-suited to their task and turned to farming. Maciej Stryjkowski mentions German peasants near Przeworsk, Przemyśl, Sanok, and Jarosław, describing them as good farmers.

Some Germans were attracted by kings seeking specialists in various trades, such as craftsmen and miners. They usually settled in newer market and mining settlements. The main settlement areas were in the vicinity of Krosno and some language islands in the Pits and the Rzeszów regions. The settlers in the Pits region were known as Uplander Saxons. Until approximately the 15th century, the ruling classes of most cities in present-day Beskidian Piedmont consisted almost exclusively of Germans.

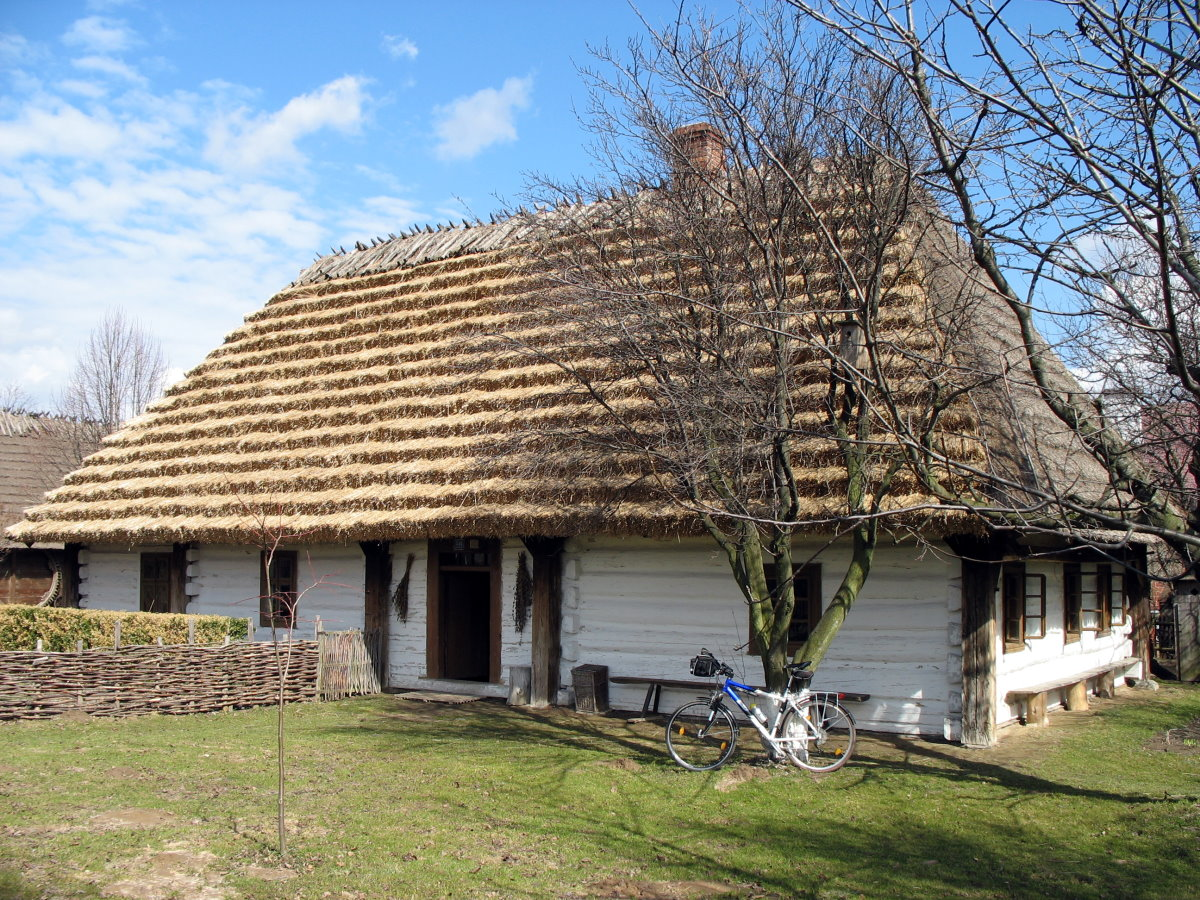
The village of Markowa. The typical Umgebindehaus – houses, about 150–200 km southeast of Kraków, around 18/19th century, built in the style of ancient mountain Walddeutsche atmosphere.

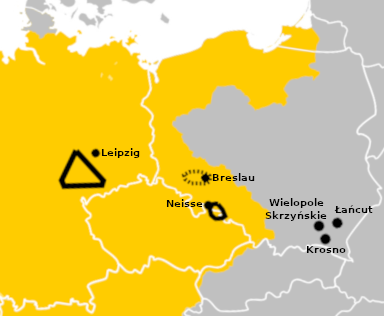
The location of the two recognizable German language islands around Łańcut and Krosno (black) in the 16th century relative to the Holy Roman Empire (yellow)

The Polonization of the Beskidian Germans was complete by the late 17th or early 18th century.

According to Wacław Maciejowski, writing in 1858, the people did not understand German but called themselves Głuchoniemcy. Wincenty Pol wrote in 1869 that their attire was similar to that of the Hungarian and Transylvanian Germans and that their main occupations were farming and weaving. He stated that in some areas the people were of Swedish origin; however, they all spoke flawlessly in a Lesser Poland dialect of Polish. In 1885, Józef Szujski wrote that the Gluchoniemcy spoke only Polish, but there were traces of a variety of original languages which showed that, when they arrived, the term Niemiec was applied to "everyone". In the modern Polish language, Niemiec refers to Germans, but in earlier centuries it was sometimes also used in reference to Hungarians, possibly due to similarity with the word niemy or plural niemi for "mute" or "dumb".

== Settlement ==
Important cities of this region include Iwonicz, Pilzno, Brzostek, Biecz, Gorlice, Ropczyce, Wielopole Skrzyńskie, Frysztak, Jasło, Krosno, Czudec, Rzeszów, Łańcut, Tyczyn, Brzozów, Jaćmierz, Rymanów, Przeworsk, Jarosław, Kańczuga, Przemyśl, Dynów, Brzozów, and Sanok.

== See also ==
- Carpathian Germans
- German minority in Poland
- Pogórzanie
