= Niżna Łąka =

- Village
- Location within Poland
- Coordinates: 49°37′30″N 21°43′54″E
- Country: Poland
- Voivodeship: Subcarpathian
- County: Krosno
- Gmina: Miejsce Piastowe

Niżna Łąka [ˈniʐna ˈwɔŋka] is a village in the administrative district of Gmina Miejsce Piastowe, within Krosno County, Subcarpathian Voivodeship, in south-eastern Poland.
