= Miejsce Piastowe =

- Village
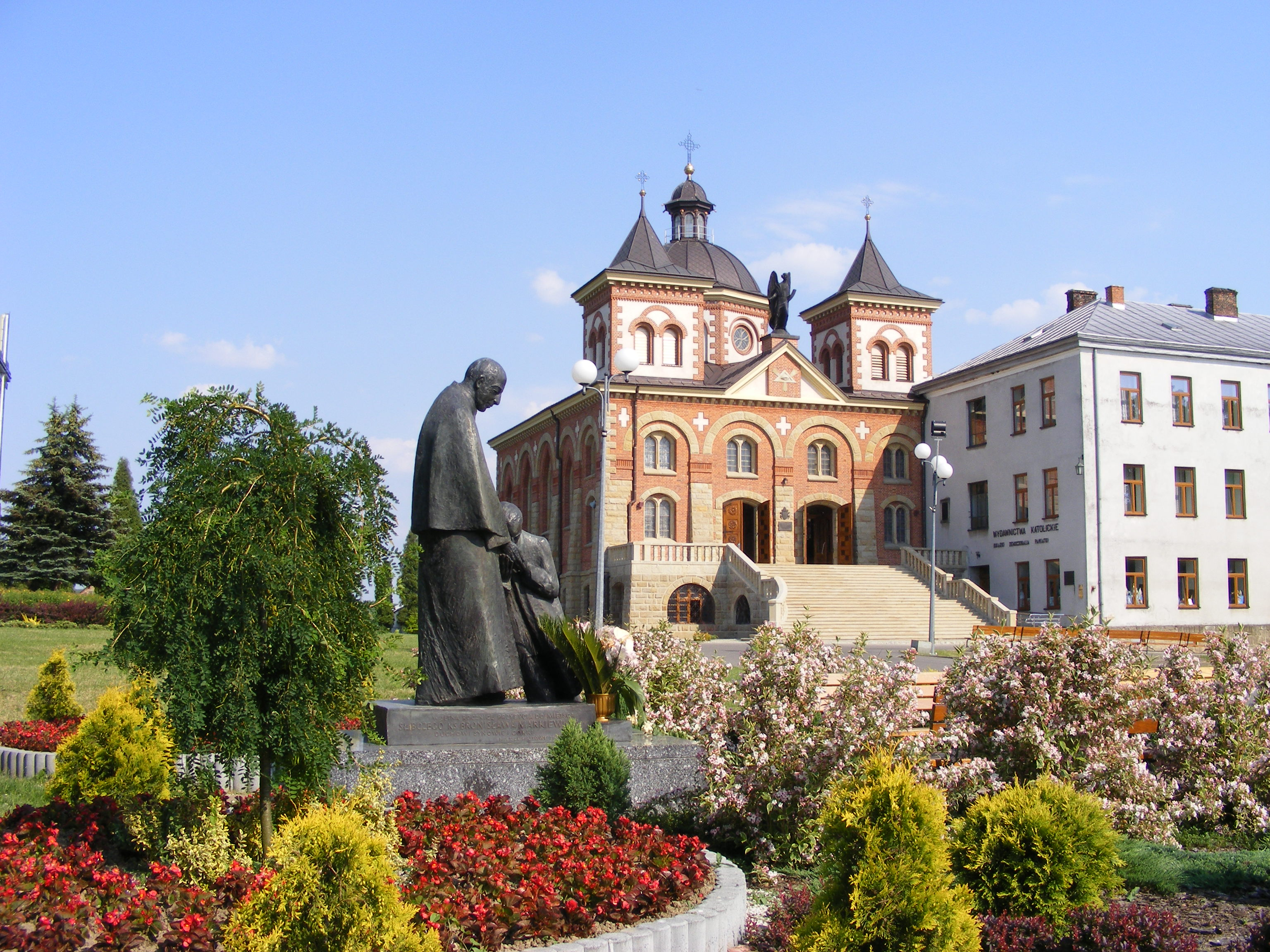
- Church of Michael the Archangel and Bronisław Markiewicz

- Coat of arms

- Location within Poland
- Coordinates: 49°38′N 21°47′E
- Country: Poland
- Voivodeship: Subcarpathian
- County: Krosno
- Gmina: Miejsce Piastowe
- Elevation: 285 m (935 ft)

Miejsce Piastowe [ˈmjɛi̯st͡sɛ pjasˈtɔvɛ] is a village in Krosno County, Subcarpathian Voivodeship, in south-eastern Poland. It is the seat of the gmina (administrative district) called Gmina Miejsce Piastowe.
