= Widacz, Gmina Miejsce Piastowe =

Widacz
- Village
- Location within Poland
- Coordinates: 49°37′49″N 21°50′38″E
- Country: Poland
- Voivodeship: Subcarpathian
- County: Krosno
- Gmina: Miejsce Piastowe
- Population: 870

Widacz [ˈvidat͡ʂ] is a village in the administrative district of Gmina Miejsce Piastowe, within Krosno County, Subcarpathian Voivodeship, in south-eastern Poland.
