= Łężany, Podkarpackie Voivodeship =

Łężany
- Village
- Location within Poland
- Coordinates: 49°38′N 21°48′E
- Country: Poland
- Voivodeship: Subcarpathian
- County: Krosno
- Gmina: Miejsce Piastowe
- Elevation: 270 m (890 ft)
- Population: 2,500

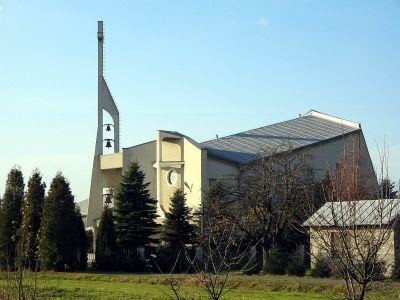
Church in Łężany

Łężany [wɛ̃ˈʐanɨ] is a village in the administrative district of Gmina Miejsce Piastowe, within Krosno County, Subcarpathian Voivodeship, in south-eastern Poland.
