= Zmiennica =

- Village
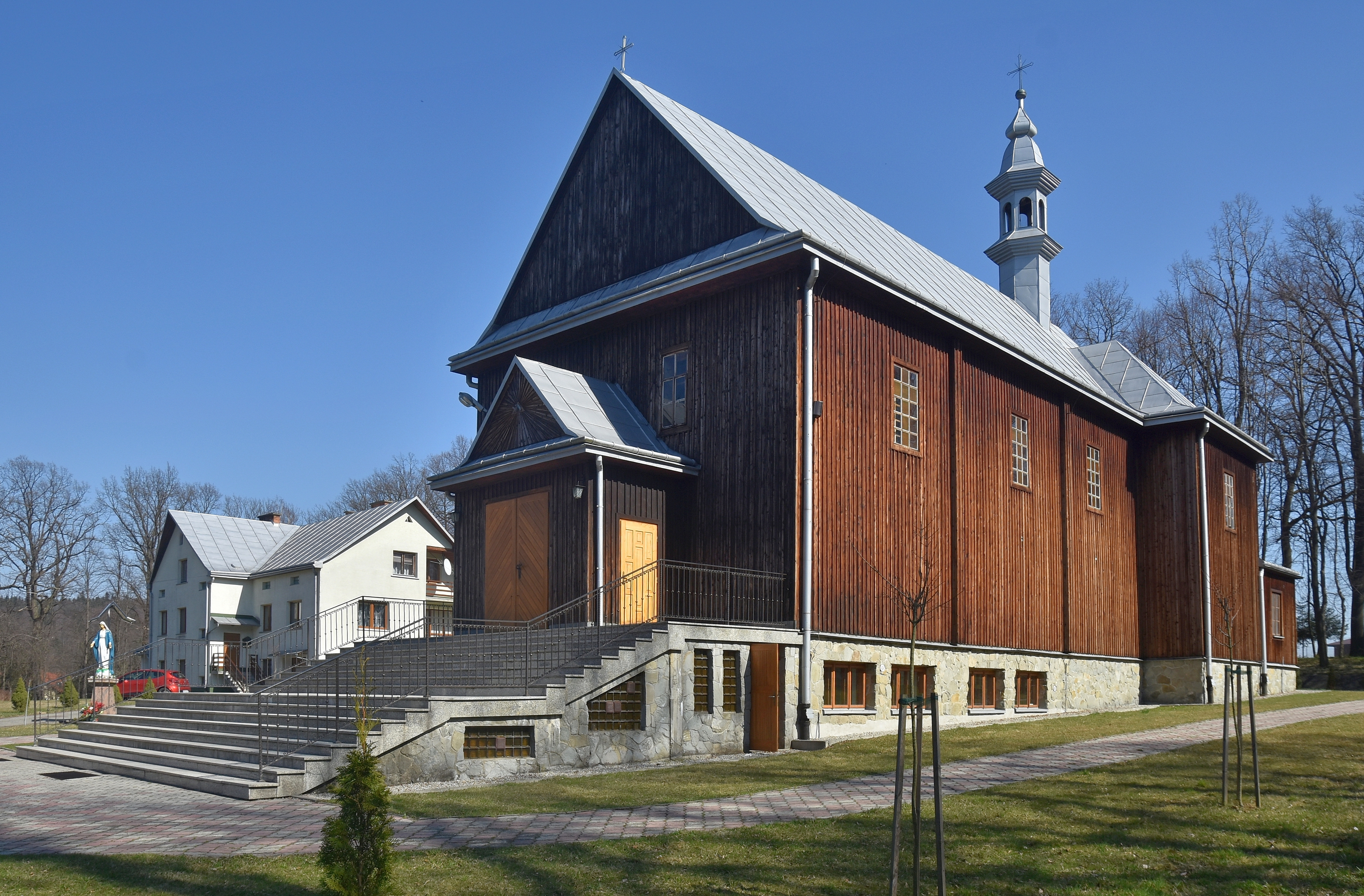
- Holy Trinity Church

- Location within Poland
- Coordinates: 49°42′N 21°58′E
- Country: Poland
- Voivodeship: Subcarpathian
- County: Brzozów
- Gmina: Brzozów
- Population: 1,100

Zmiennica [zmʲɛˈɲːit͡sa] is a village in the administrative district of Gmina Brzozów, within Brzozów County, Subcarpathian Voivodeship, in south-eastern Poland.
