= Targowiska =

- Village
- Location within Poland
- Coordinates: 49°38′N 21°50′E
- Country: Poland
- Voivodeship: Subcarpathian
- County: Krosno
- Gmina: Miejsce Piastowe
- Highest elevation: 310 m (1,020 ft)
- Lowest elevation: 290 m (950 ft)
- Population: 2,250

Targowiska [tarɡɔˈviska] is a village in the administrative district of Gmina Miejsce Piastowe, within Krosno County, Subcarpathian Voivodeship, in south-eastern Poland.
