= Lesko (disambiguation) =

Lesko is a town in Poland, and the capital of Lesko County. Lesko may also refer to

- Lesko Stone, a rock formation near the city of Lesko
- Gmina Lesko, an administrative district in Lesko County
- Łęsko, a village in Poland
- Lesko (surname)
