= Lesko Synagogue =

Cultural museum and former synagogue in Lesko, Poland

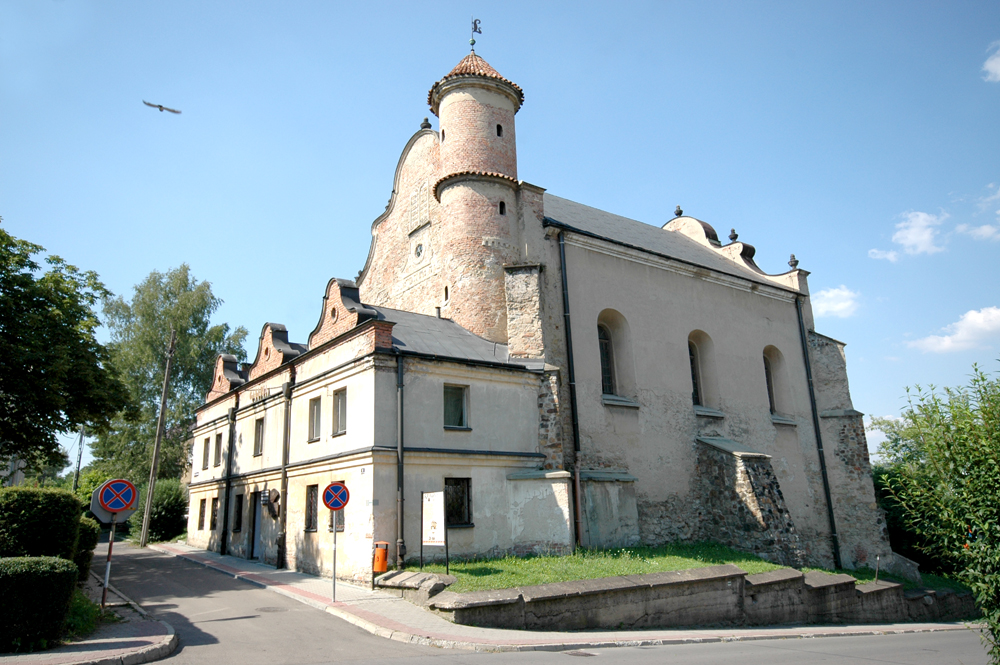
- The former synagogue in 2007, now part of the Muzeum Żydów Galicji

- Location of the former synagogue, now museum, in Podkarpackie Voivodeship

Religion
- Affiliation: Hasidic Judaism (former)
- Rite: Nusach Sefard
- Ecclesiastical or organizational status: Synagogue (1654–1942); Profane use (1950s); Jewish museum (since 1980s)
- Status: Inactive (as a synagogue); Repurposed

Location
- Location: 16 Berka Joselewicza Street, Lesko, Podkarpackie Voivodeship
- Country: Poland
- Interactive map of Lesko Synagogue
- Coordinates: 49°28′14″N 22°19′52″E

Architecture
- Type: Synagogue architecture
- Style: Baroque; Mannerist
- Groundbreaking: 1626
- Completed: 1654
- Materials: Stone (Note: Brick according to one source.)

The Lesko Synagogue was a former Hasidic Jewish congregation and synagogue, located at 16 Berka Joselewicza Street, in Lesko, in the Podkarpackie Voivodeship of Poland. The synagogue had functioned as a place of worship until 1942 when the building was deserted by the Nazis during World War II. In the 1980s the building was repurposed for use as part of the Muzeum Żydów Galicji (Museum of the Jews of Galicia), a Jewish history museum.

== History ==
The synagogue was built between 1626 and 1654 by the Sephardic (Note: With another source claiming the congregation worshiped in the Ashkenazi rite.) Jewish community of Lesko. By the twentieth century, it was one of six synagogues in the town, and the only one whose building survived the Second World War, although in a very damaged state; the interior was devastated by the German invaders of Poland. For almost two decades after the war, it was neglected. It was renovated from the 1960s onwards.

The building was constructed in the Mannerist and early Baroque style with characteristic gables decorated with volutes and stone baroque vases. Some of the elements are gothic - buttresses, tower. The façade bears a Hebrew inscription that reads, in translation: "He was afraid and said, 'How awesome is this place! This is none other than the house of God; this is the gate of heaven'" (Genesis 28:17). The interior was adorned in mannerist style with niches, cornices and architraves.

Since the 1980s the synagogue is the site of Muzeum Żydów Galicji (Museum of the Jews of Galicia) and an art gallery that includes exhibits by artists of the Bieszczady region.

== Gallery ==
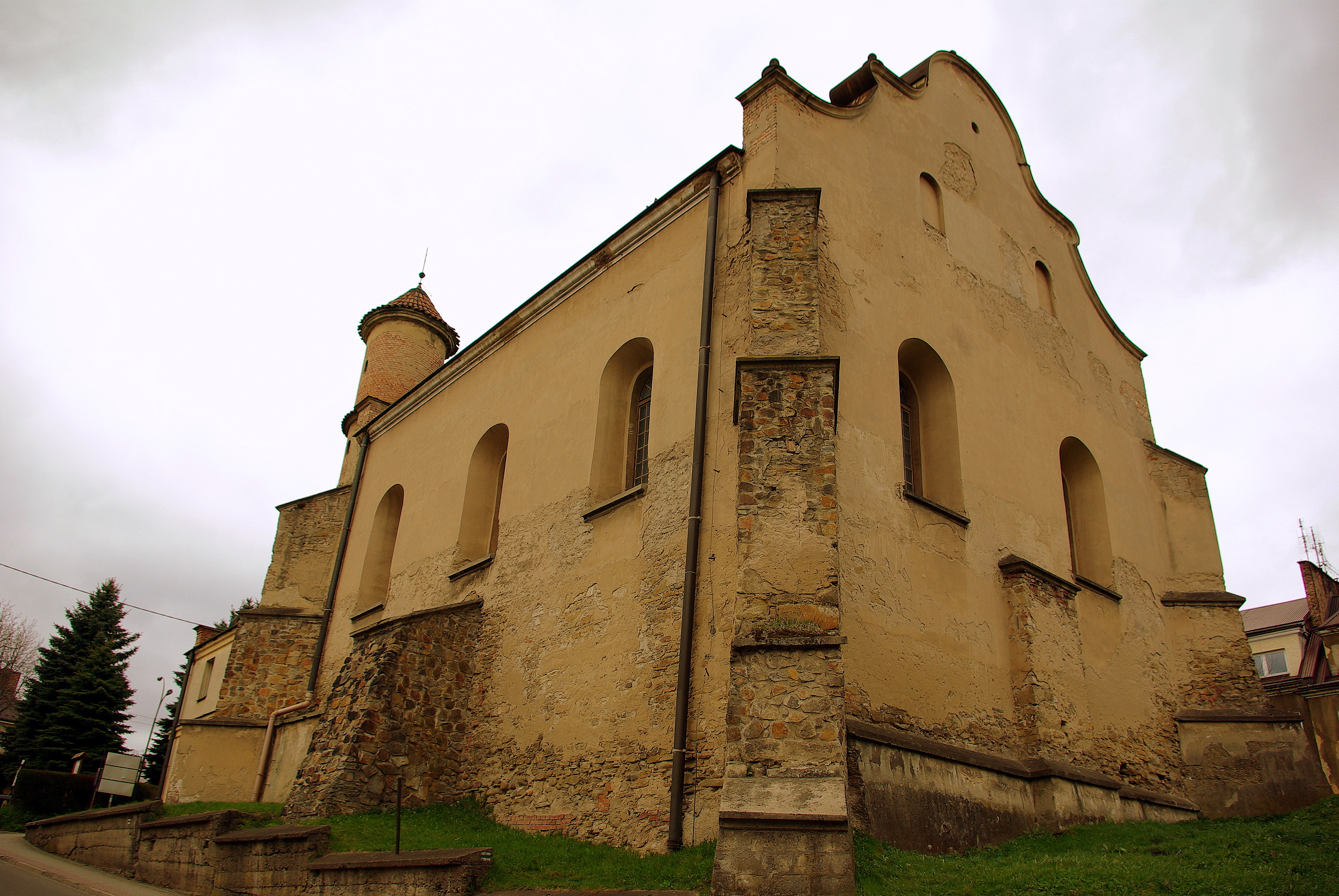
South-facing view

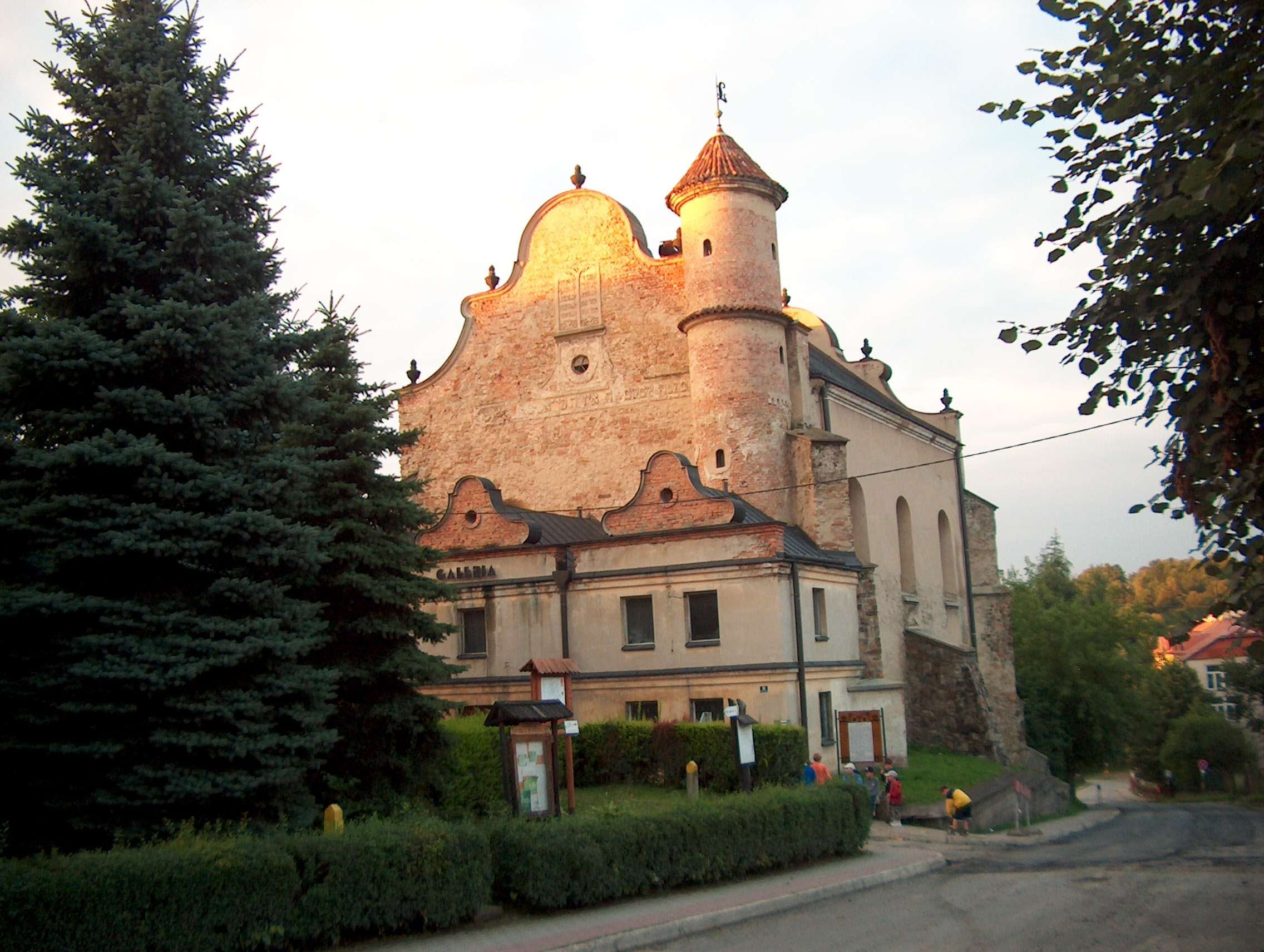
North-facing view (toward the city center)

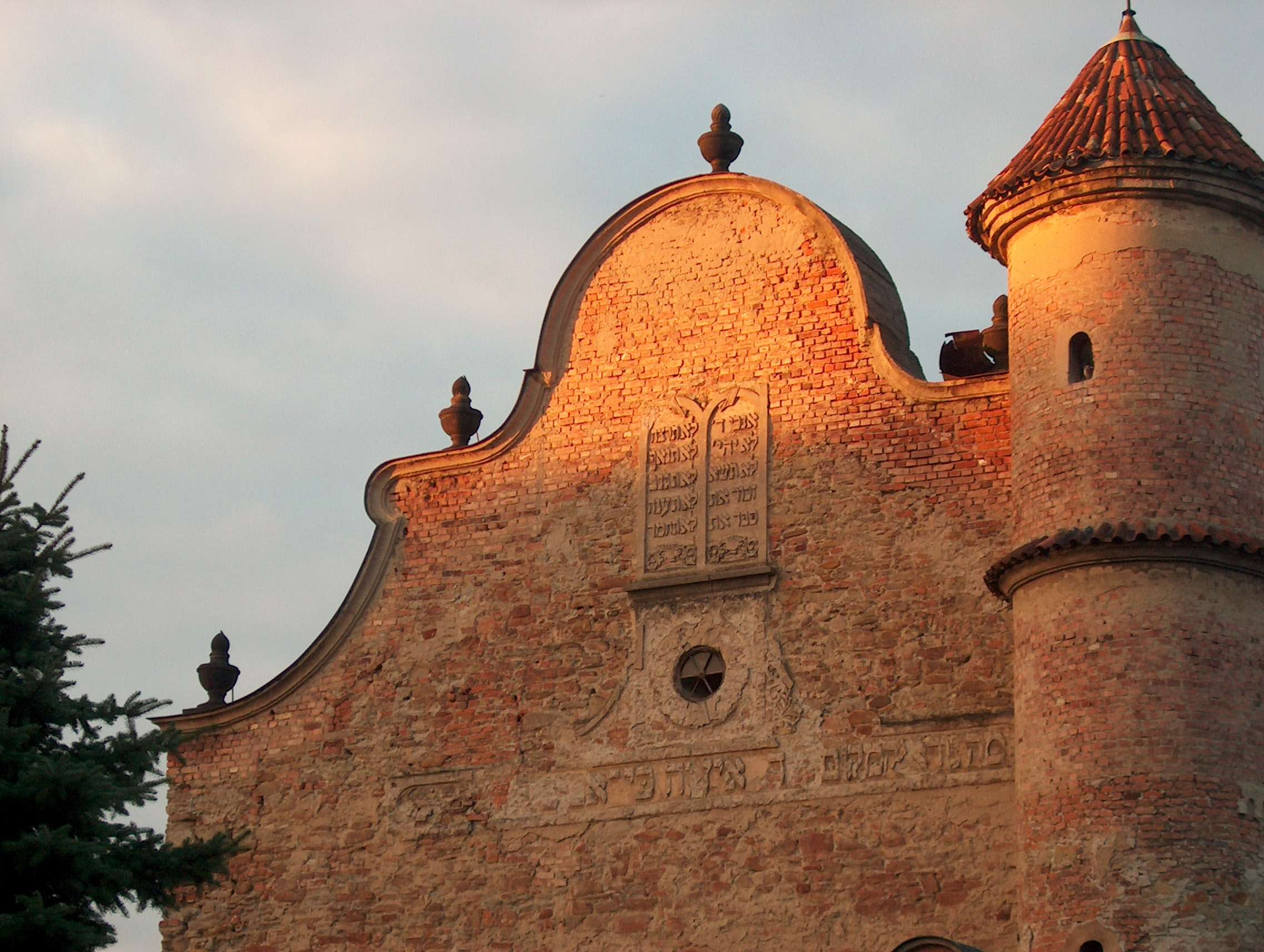

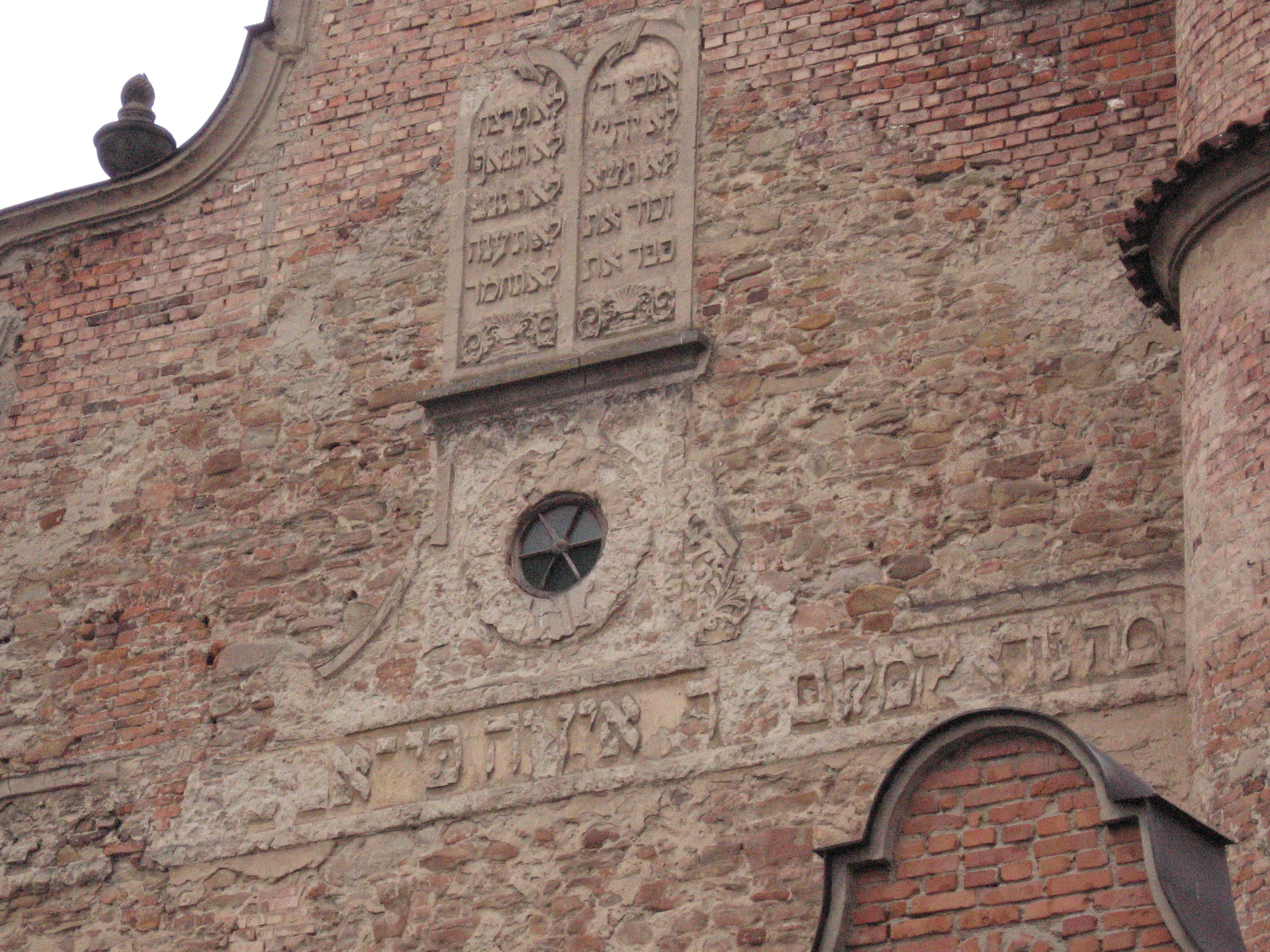
The Ten Commandments

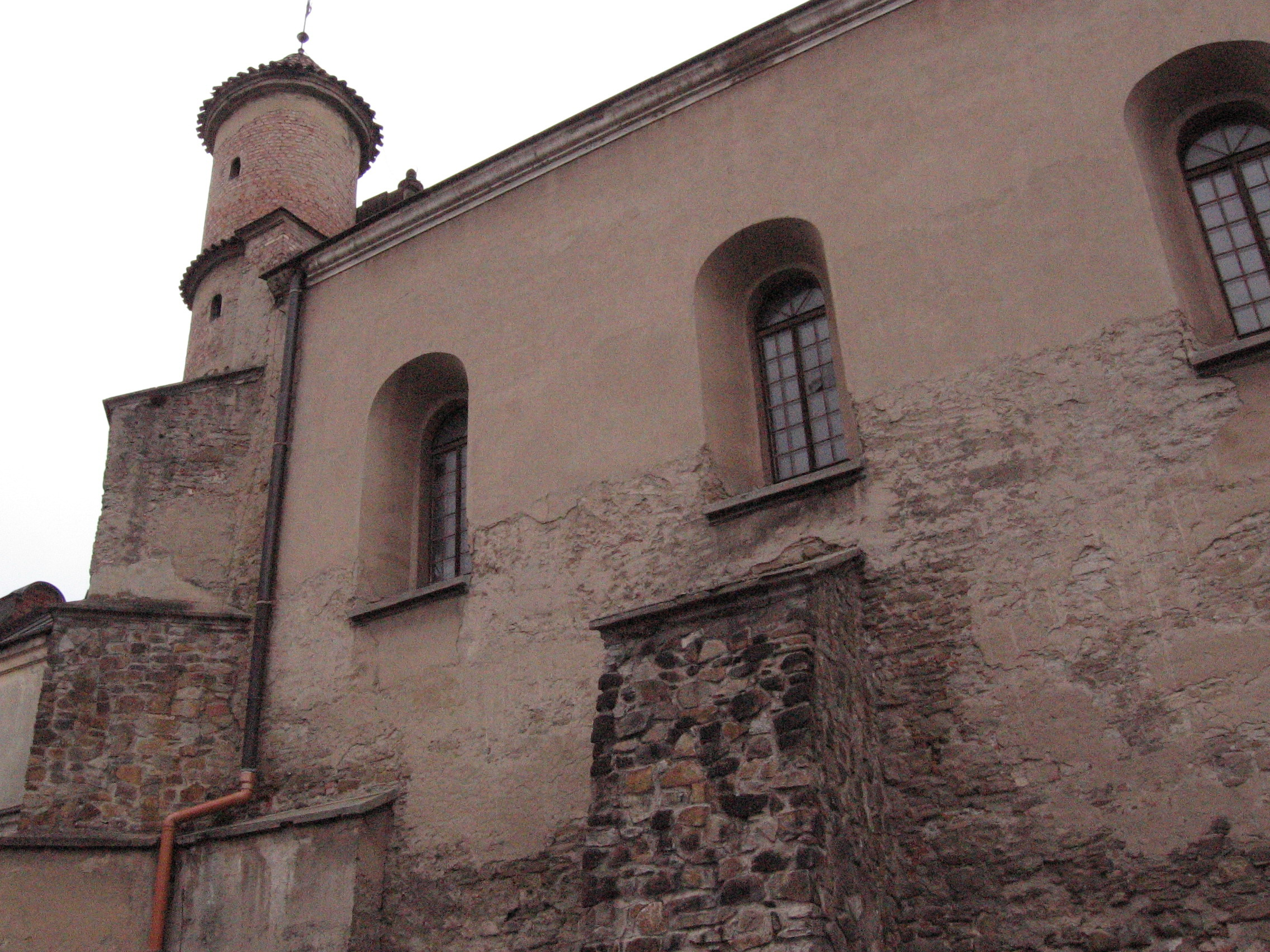
East-facing view

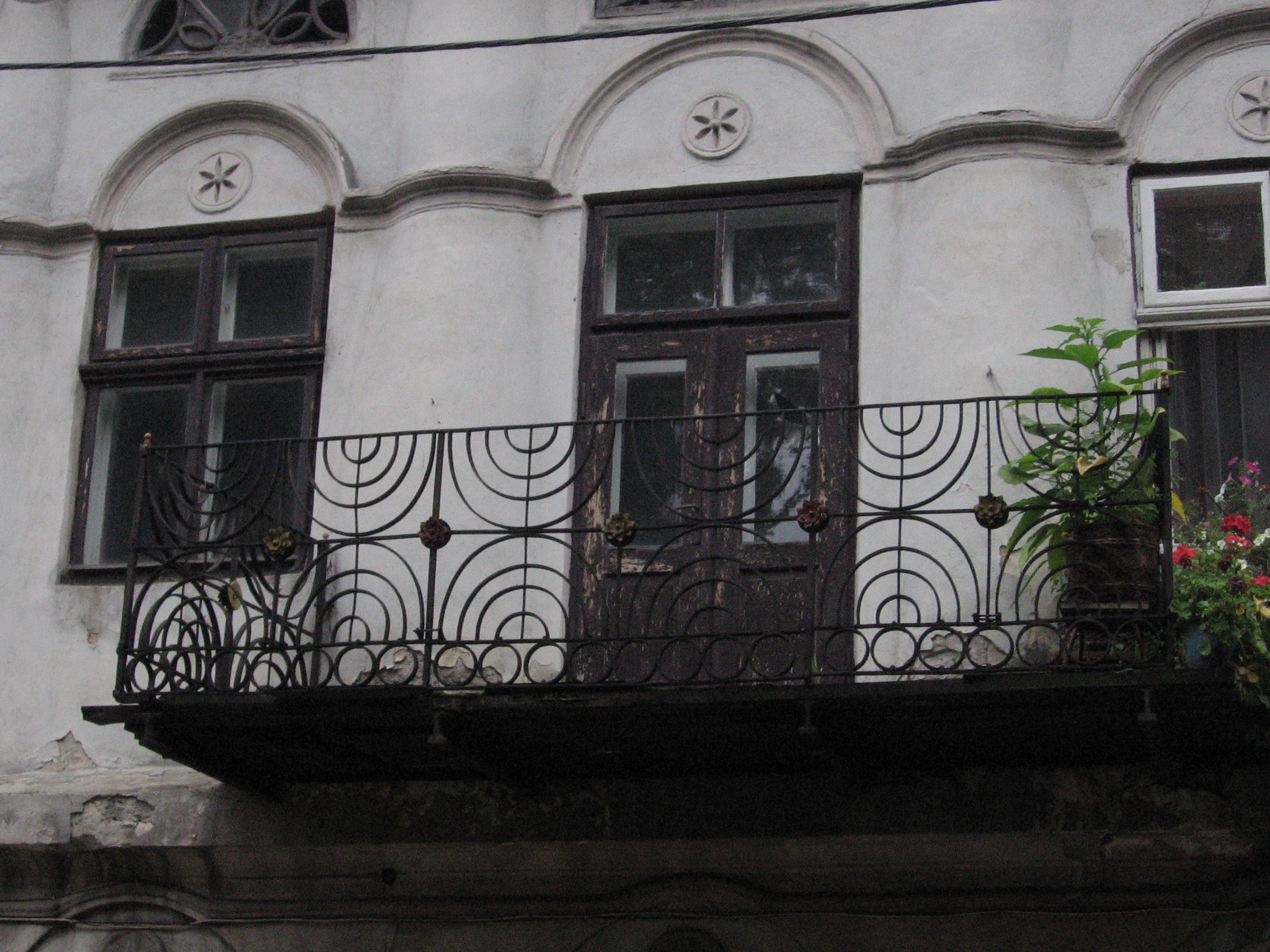

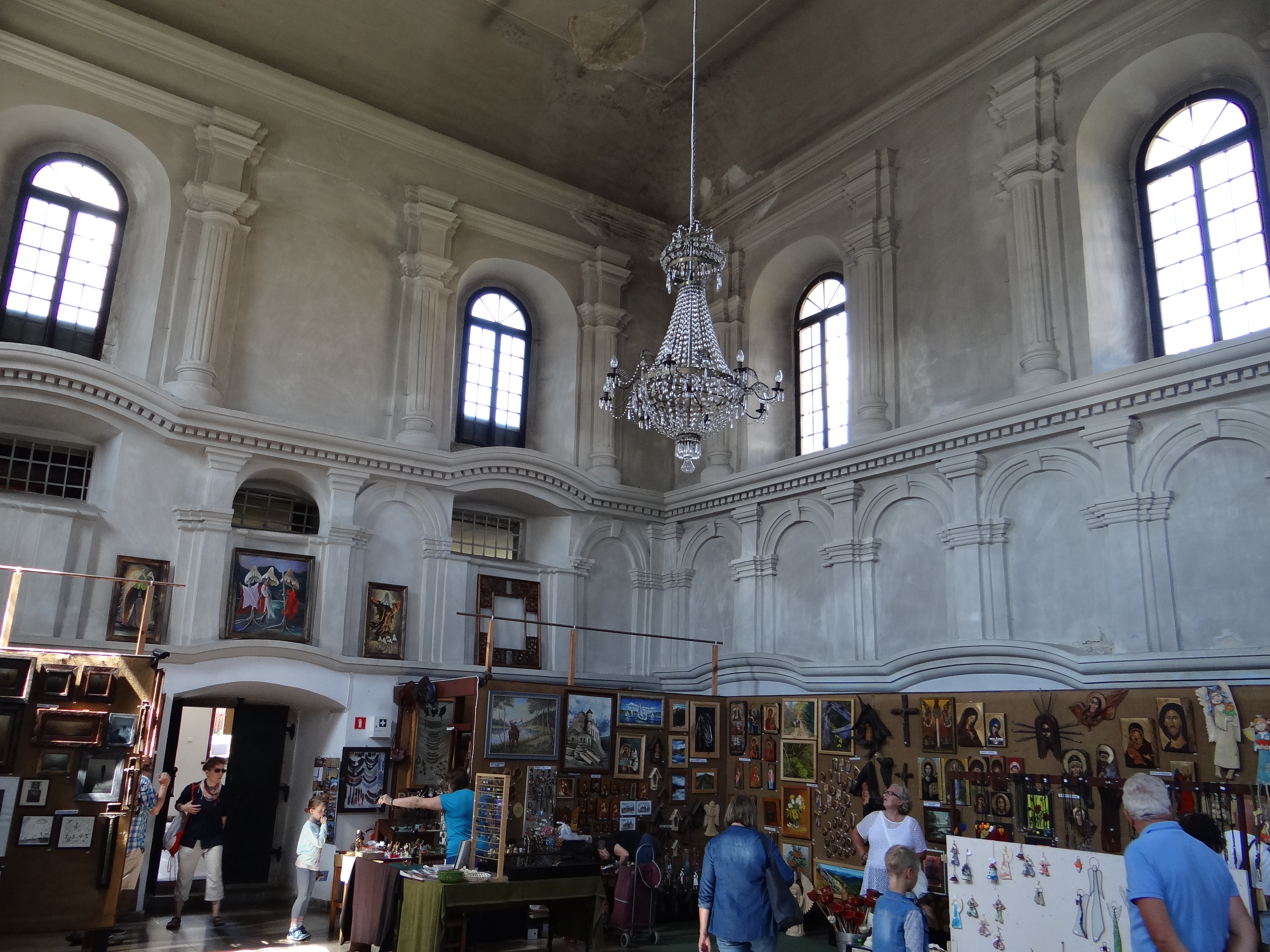
Interior, showing an art exhibition (2017)

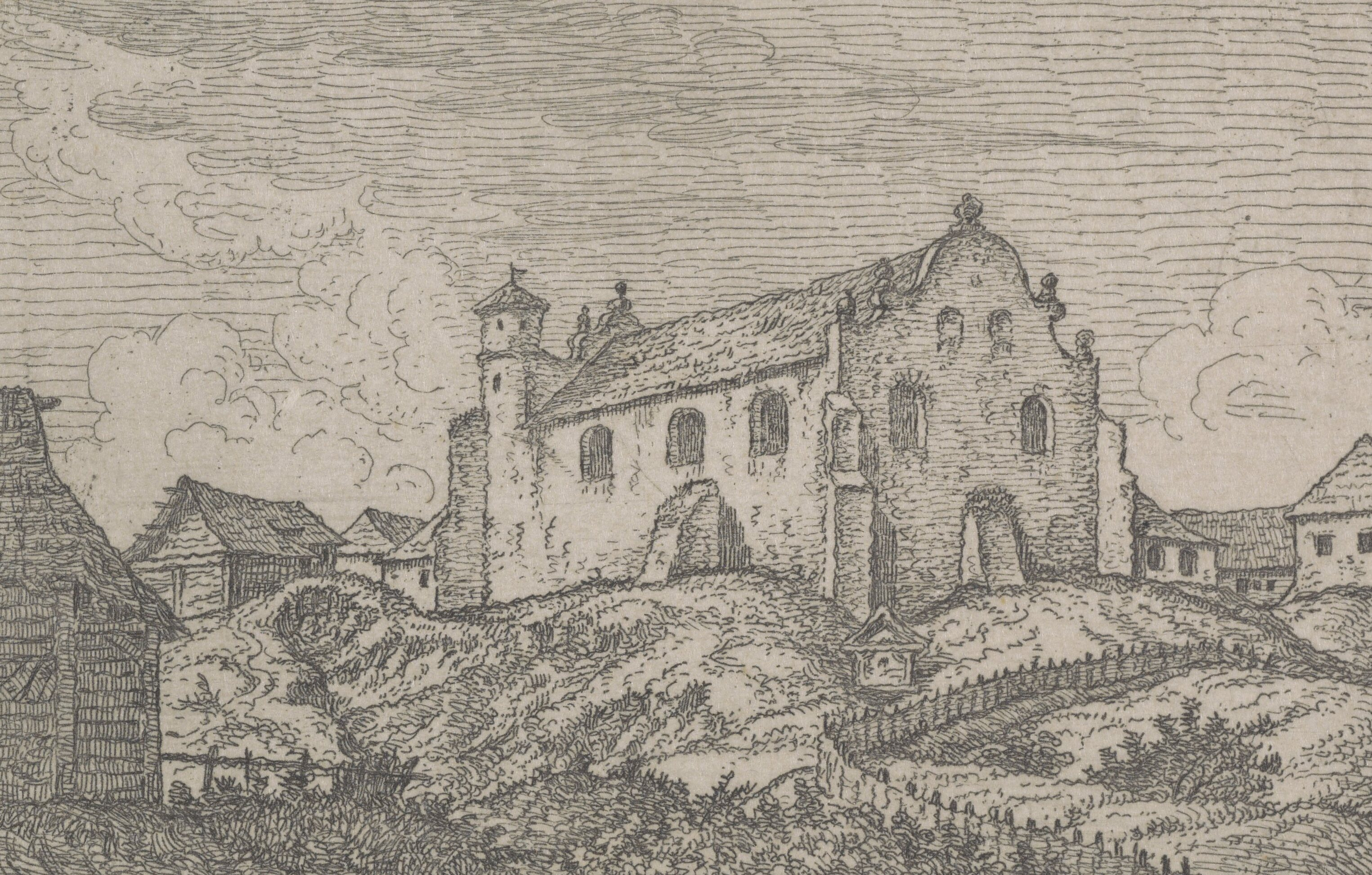
The synagogue ca 1838

== See also ==
- History of the Jews in Poland
- List of active synagogues in Poland
- List of mannerist structures in Southern Poland
- List of museums in Poland
