= Lesko =

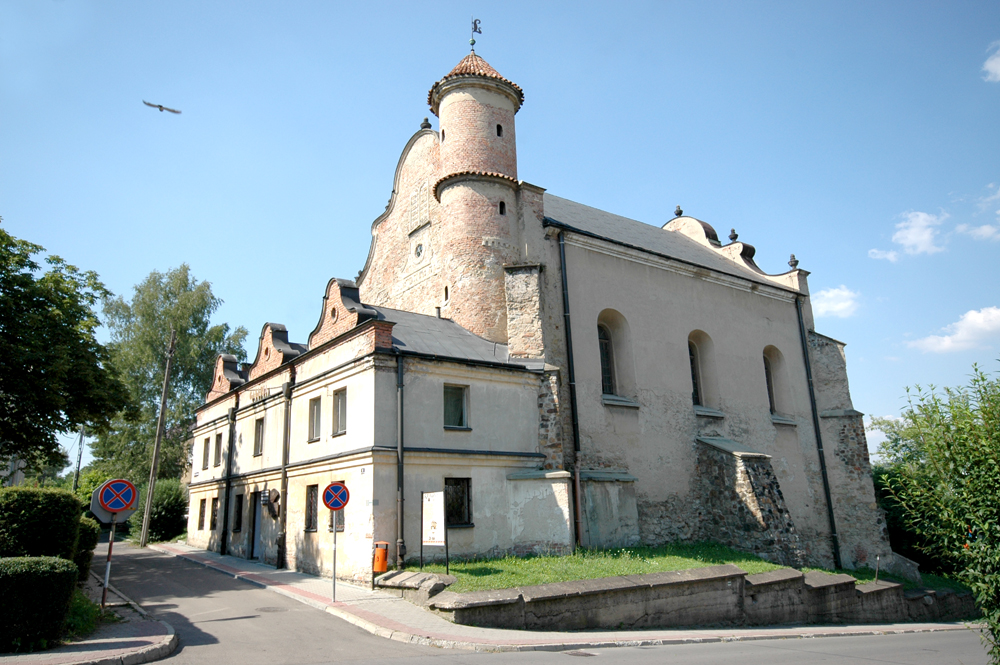
- The synagogue in Lesko

- Coat of arms

- Location within Poland
- Coordinates: 49°28′28″N 22°19′44″E
- Country: Poland
- Voivodeship: Subcarpathian
- County: Lesko
- Gmina: Lesko
- Established: 14th century
- Town rights: before 1470

Government
  - Mayor: Adam Snarski (Ind.)

Area
  - Total: 15.09 km^{2} (5.83 sq mi)

Population (2006)
  - Total: 5,864
  - Density: 388.6/km^{2} (1,006/sq mi)
- Time zone: UTC+1 (CET)
  - Summer (DST): UTC+2 (CEST)
- Postal code: 38-600
- Area code: +48 13
- Car plates: RLS
- Website: http://www.lesko.pl

Lesko [ˈlɛskɔ] (Lisko until 1926) (Note: Ukrainian: Лісько, romanized: Lisko; Latin: Lescow, alias Olesco Lescovium; Yiddish: לינסק, romanized: Linsk) is a town in south-eastern Poland with a population of 5,755 (02.06.2009) situated in the Bieszczady mountains. It is located in the heartland of the Doły (Pits), and its average altitude is 390 metres (1,280 feet) above sea level, although there are some hills located within the confines of the city. Since 2002 it has been the capital of Lesko County.

Lesko is situated in the Subcarpathian Voivodeship (since 1999); previously it was in Krosno Voivodeship (1975–1998).

== History ==
Lesko was probably founded in the fourteenth century; records first mention it in 1436. It was granted its town charter in approximately 1469, when it was owned by the Kmita family. In the seventeenth century, the town was quite an important centre of trade and craftsmanship, with approximately 1,500 inhabitants. Its heyday ended in 1704, when it was looted by the Swedish troops during the Great Northern War.

In 1772, following the First Partition of Poland, the town was located in the Austrian Empire (from 1867 Austria-Hungary) until Poland regained its independence in 1918. In 1872 a railway line passing just 3 kilometres (2 miles) north of the town was built.

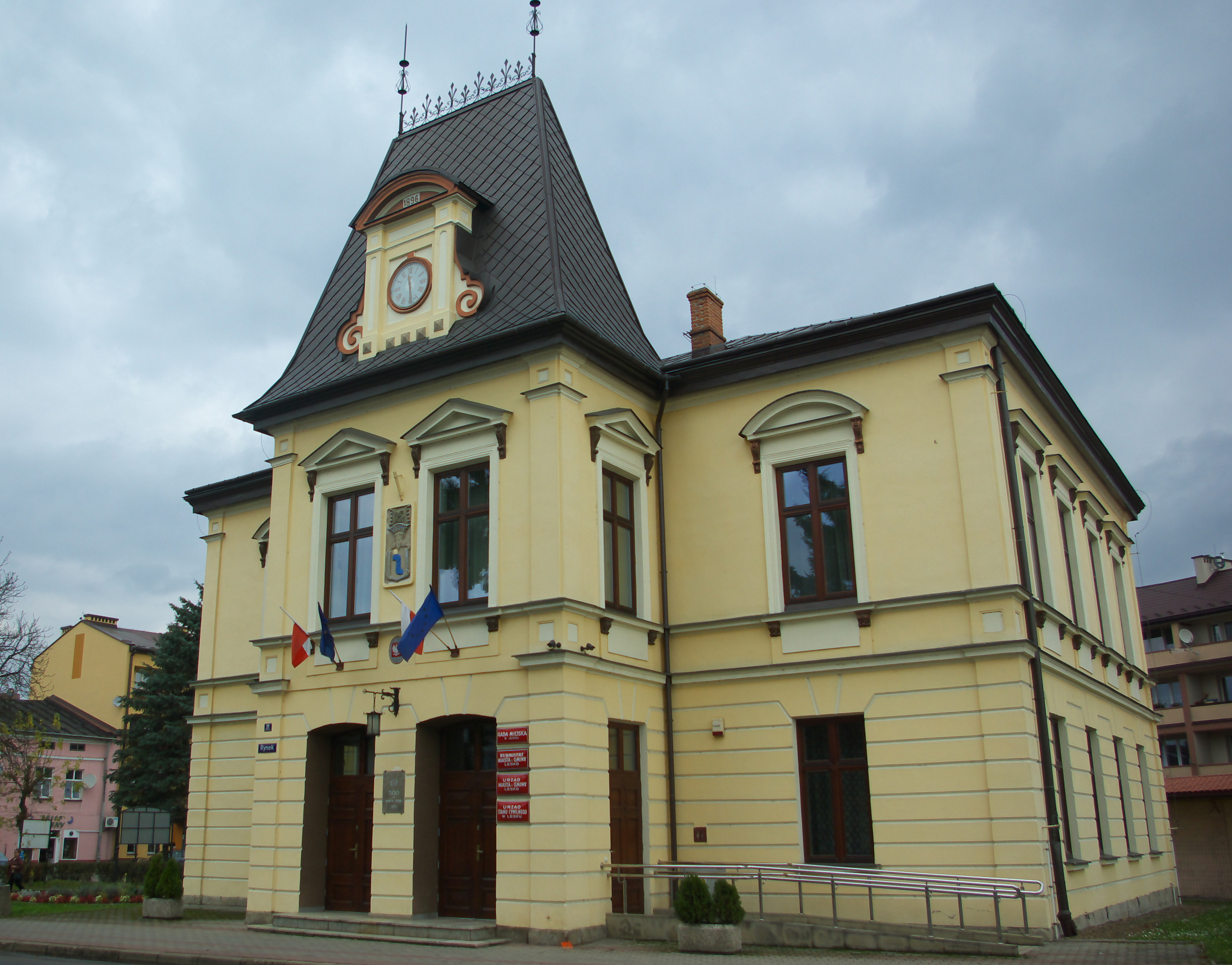
Town Hall in 2017.

In 1890 the Jewish population of Lesko was 2,425.

In September 1939, following the territorial division of Poland by the Ribbentrop-Molotov Pact, the border between German and Soviet occupation zones ran along the river San in the area of Lesko. Thus the town ended up in the Soviet zone, as it was located on the eastern bank of the river. In 1940 to 1941, as part of the construction of the Molotov Line along the new border, the Soviets constructed a line of bunkers along the river to defend the river crossings, some of them right in the town. During Operation Barbarossa the Germans destroyed the bunkers in the initial days of their invasion (their ruins exist to this day). The town was liberated from the Germans by the Red Army in September, 1944. In 1945 the border between Poland and the Soviet Union was moved somewhat eastwards from the San river, so Lesko ended up in Poland following the postwar territorial rearrangements. Nevertheless, it remained very close to the Soviet border until the 1951 Polish–Soviet territorial exchange which moved the border further eastward.

During the war, after the town was occupied by Nazi Germany in 1941, its Jewish community (about 60% of the town's population) was murdered in the Holocaust.

In the immediate postwar years the area was the scene of the fighting between Polish military forces and the Ukrainian Insurgent Army. The fighting ended after the Ukrainian population was expelled in the course of Operation Vistula in 1947. The city and its economy only started to recover in the 1950s, after a government program encouraging people from other areas of Poland to settle there.

Currently Lesko is a gateway to the Bieszczady Mountains. The city has numerous outdoor recreational clubs.

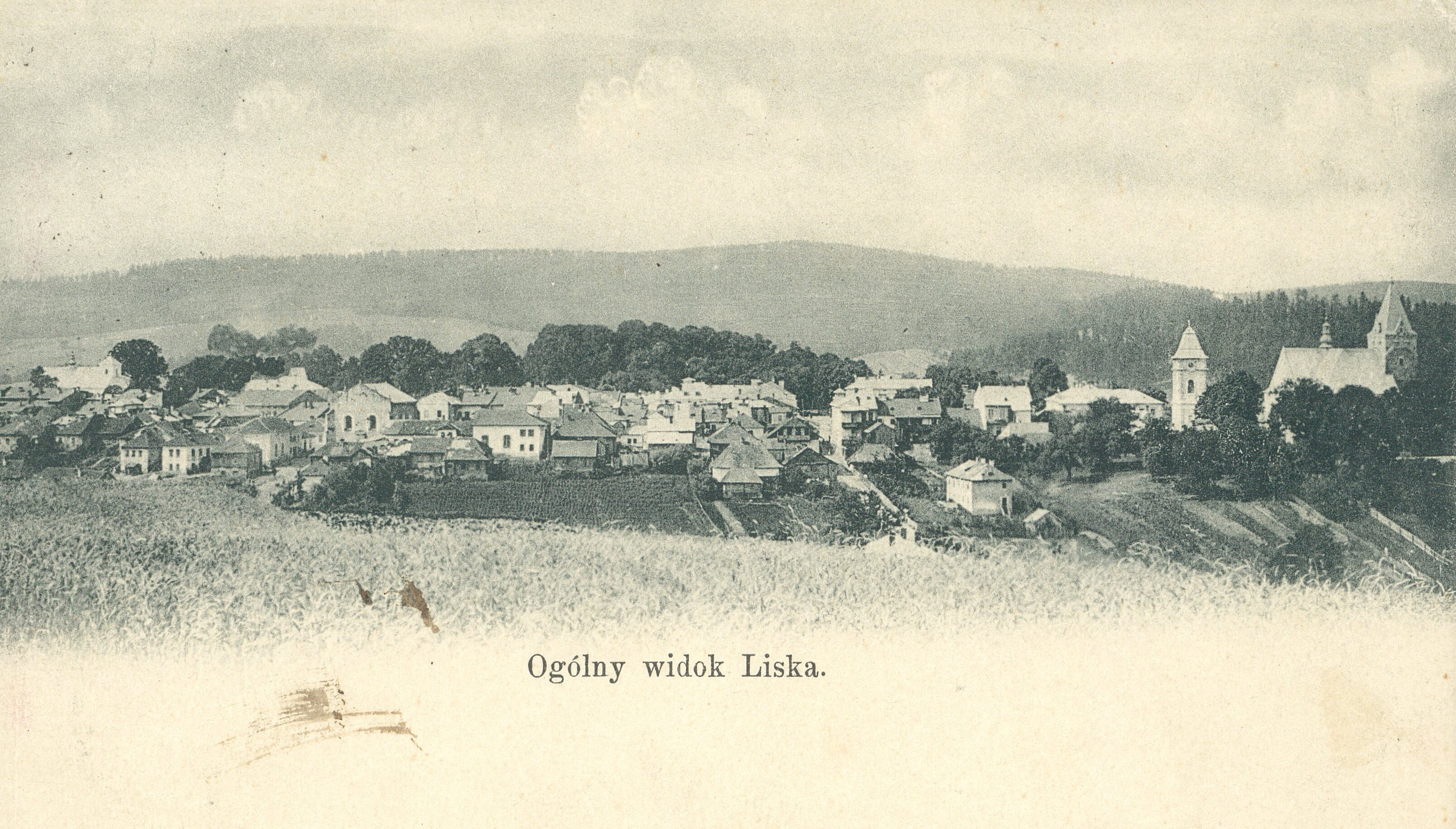
Lesko, before 1908

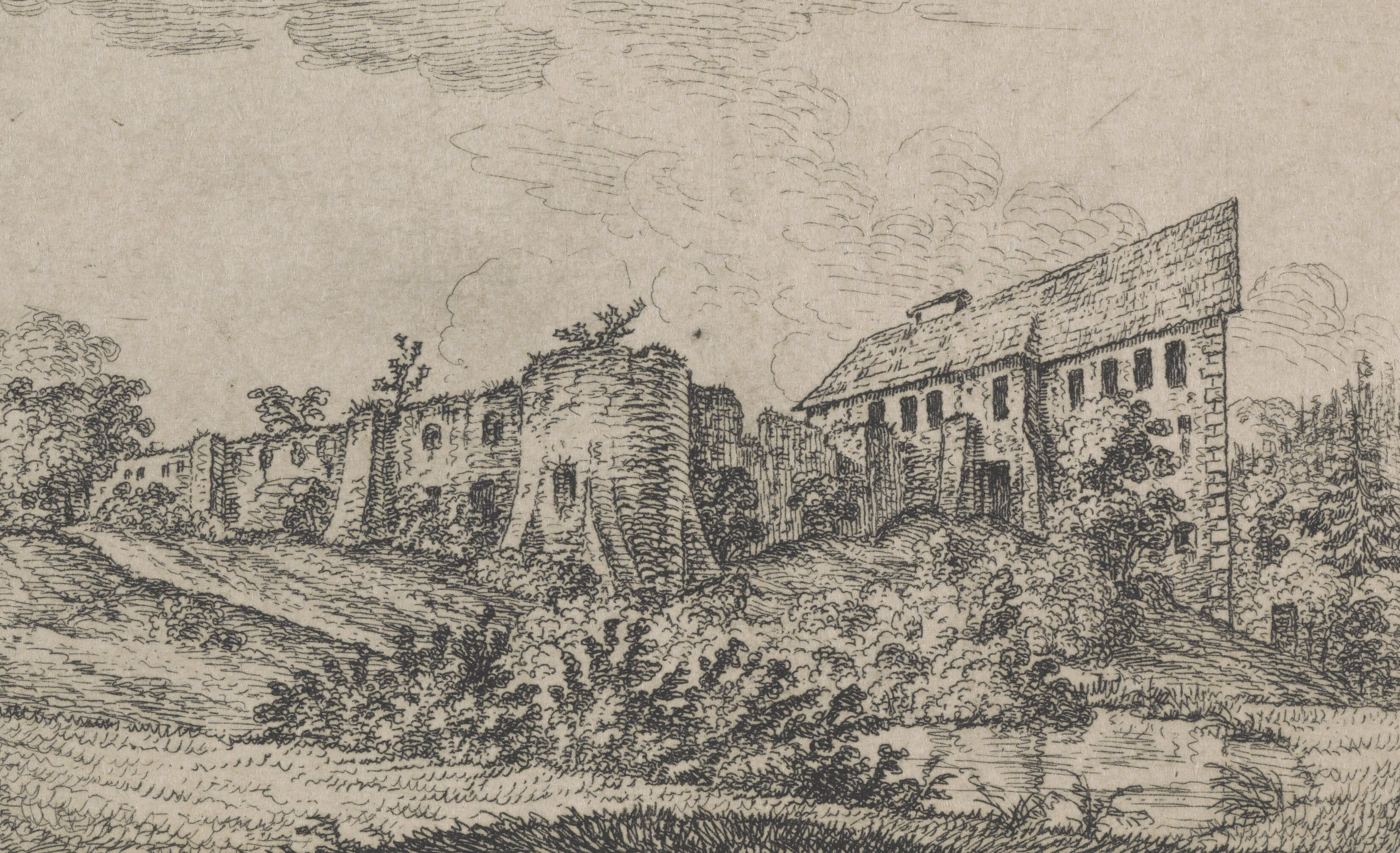
Castle, ca 1838

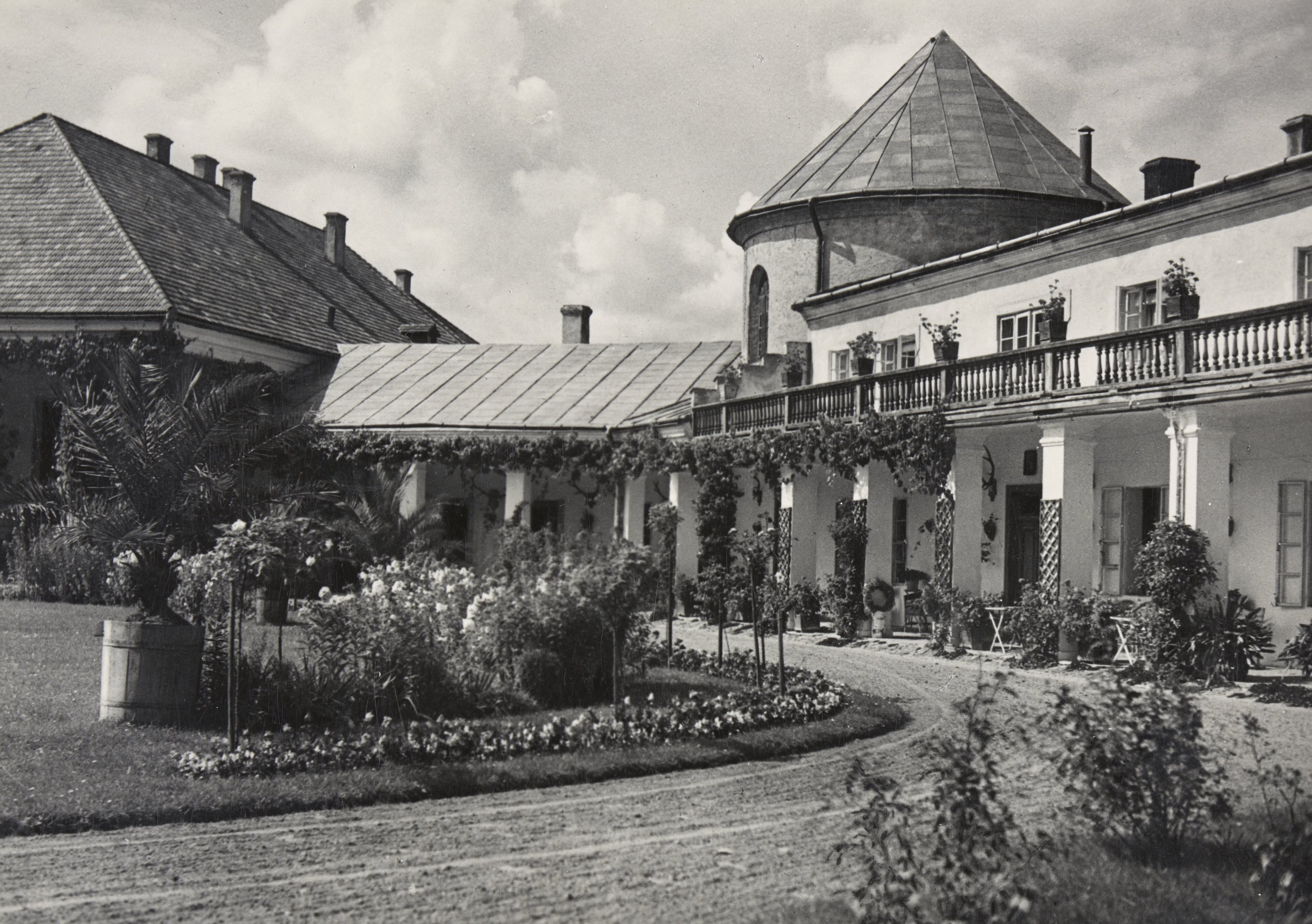
Castle 1939

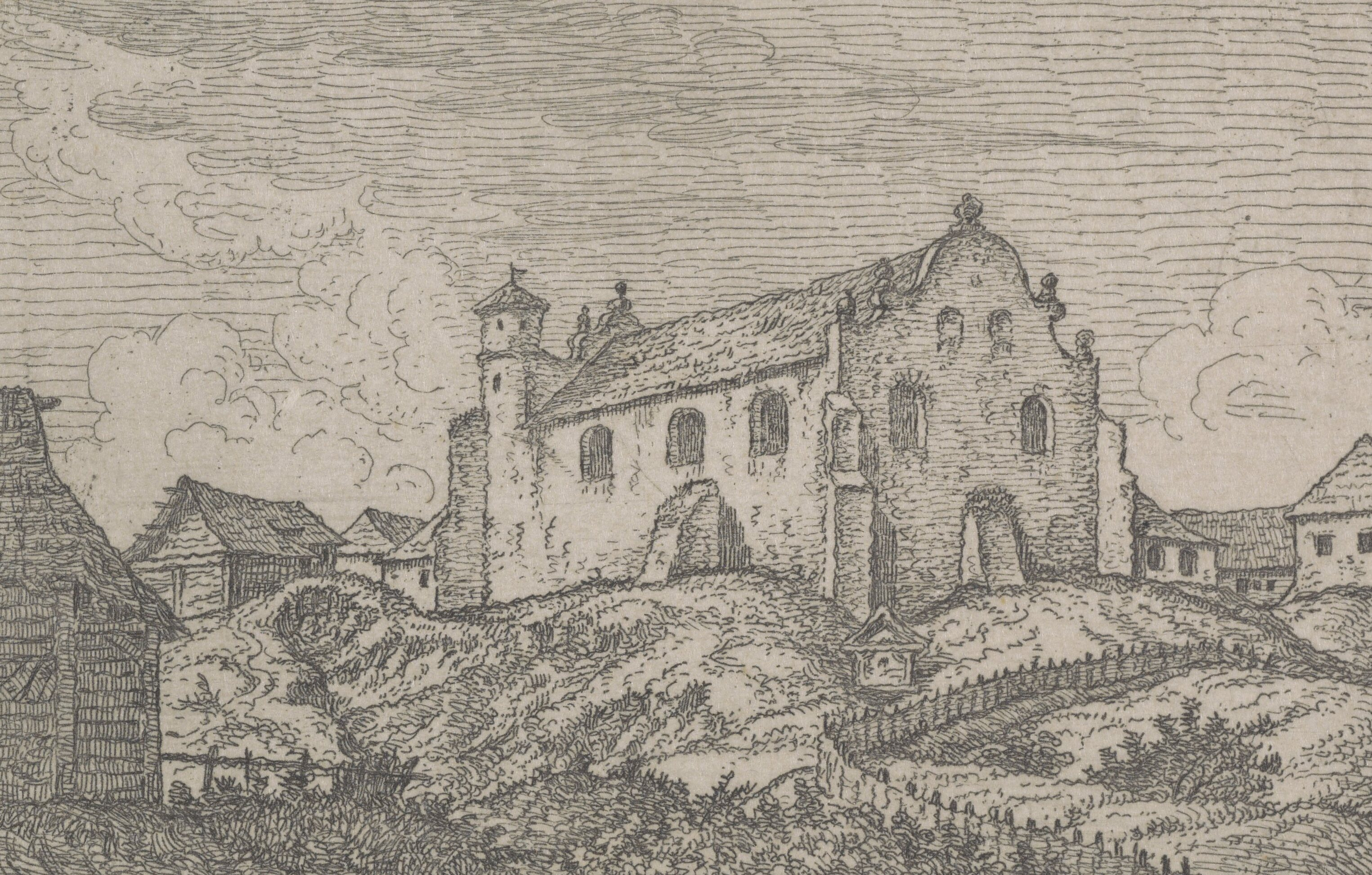
Synagogue, ca 1838

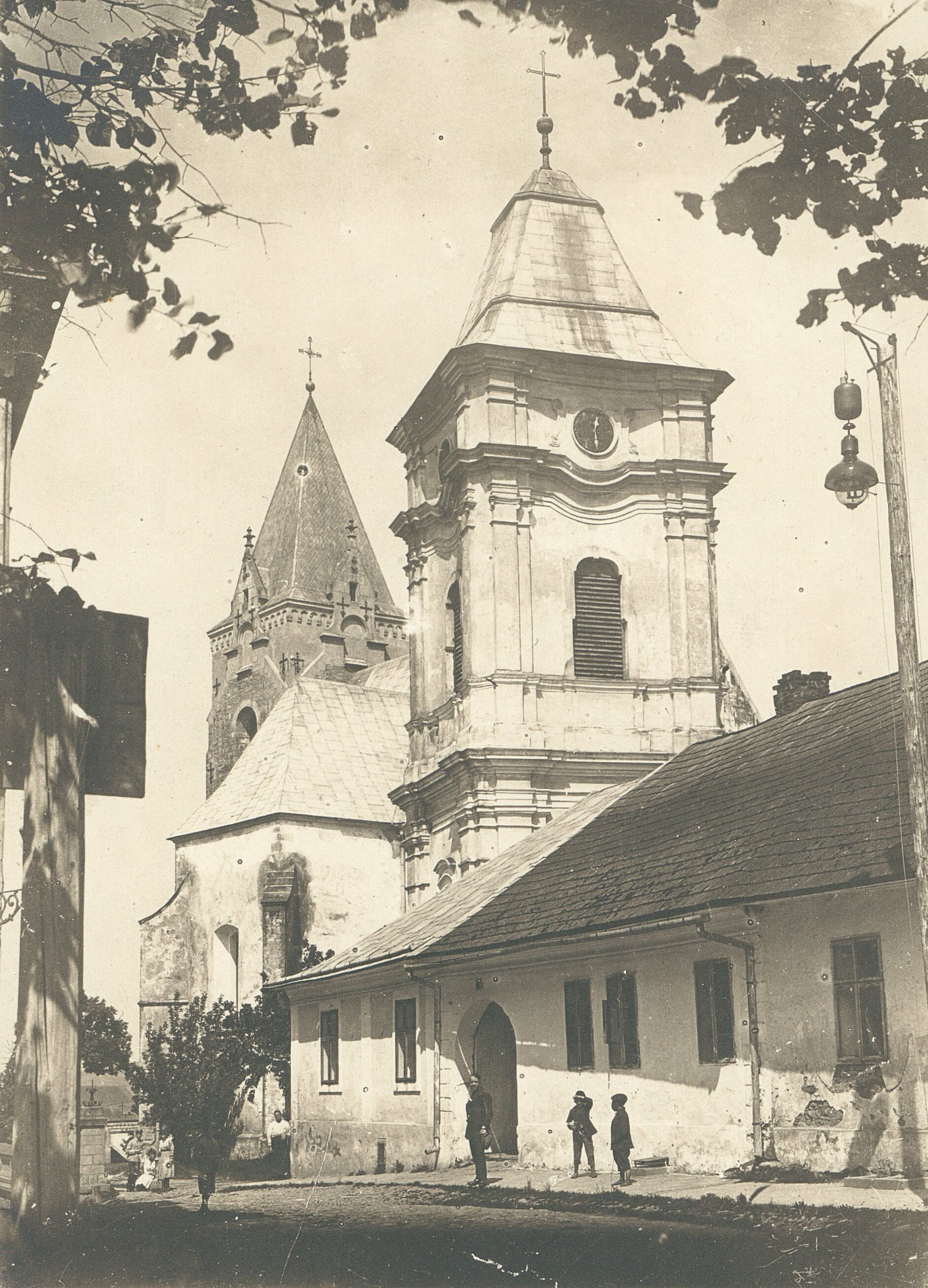
St. Anthony's Chapel, after 1906

== Climate ==
Lesko has an oceanic climate (Köppen climate classification: Cfb) using the −3 °C (27 °F) isotherm or a humid continental climate (Köppen climate classification: Dfb) using the 0 °C (32 °F) isotherm.

Climate data for Lesko (1991–2020 normals, extremes 1954–present)
Month	Jan	Feb	Mar	Apr	May	Jun	Jul	Aug	Sep	Oct	Nov	Dec	Year
Record high °C (°F)	13.5 (56.3)	17.0 (62.6)	24.5 (76.1)	28.0 (82.4)	29.8 (85.6)	33.4 (92.1)	33.2 (91.8)	35.7 (96.3)	32.4 (90.3)	26.8 (80.2)	24.1 (75.4)	15.6 (60.1)	35.7 (96.3)
Mean daily maximum °C (°F)	0.8 (33.4)	2.4 (36.3)	7.0 (44.6)	13.9 (57.0)	18.6 (65.5)	21.7 (71.1)	23.5 (74.3)	23.6 (74.5)	18.2 (64.8)	13.1 (55.6)	7.5 (45.5)	1.8 (35.2)	12.7 (54.9)
Daily mean °C (°F)	−2.2 (28.0)	−1.0 (30.2)	2.6 (36.7)	8.3 (46.9)	12.8 (55.0)	16.3 (61.3)	17.9 (64.2)	17.7 (63.9)	13.0 (55.4)	8.6 (47.5)	4.1 (39.4)	−0.8 (30.6)	8.1 (46.6)
Mean daily minimum °C (°F)	−4.8 (23.4)	−3.9 (25.0)	−1.2 (29.8)	3.2 (37.8)	7.6 (45.7)	11.2 (52.2)	12.9 (55.2)	12.6 (54.7)	8.7 (47.7)	5.1 (41.2)	1.3 (34.3)	−3.3 (26.1)	4.1 (39.4)
Record low °C (°F)	−28.8 (−19.8)	−32.5 (−26.5)	−25.2 (−13.4)	−8.3 (17.1)	−5.5 (22.1)	−0.5 (31.1)	4.4 (39.9)	1.9 (35.4)	−3.0 (26.6)	−10.5 (13.1)	−17.4 (0.7)	−29.3 (−20.7)	−32.5 (−26.5)
Average precipitation mm (inches)	38.2 (1.50)	40.9 (1.61)	43.1 (1.70)	56.8 (2.24)	101.8 (4.01)	99.3 (3.91)	125.2 (4.93)	87.7 (3.45)	86.7 (3.41)	65.1 (2.56)	47.2 (1.86)	44.4 (1.75)	836.4 (32.93)
Average extreme snow depth cm (inches)	13.2 (5.2)	16.0 (6.3)	10.0 (3.9)	3.8 (1.5)	0.0 (0.0)	0.0 (0.0)	0.0 (0.0)	0.0 (0.0)	0.0 (0.0)	1.3 (0.5)	5.5 (2.2)	8.8 (3.5)	16.0 (6.3)
Average precipitation days (≥ 0.1 mm)	17.93	16.21	15.20	14.17	17.17	16.43	16.83	12.83	15.40	15.13	15.27	17.37	189.94
Average snowy days (≥ 0 cm)	22.4	20.6	10.6	1.7	0.0	0.0	0.0	0.0	0.0	1.1	6.3	18.3	81.0
Average relative humidity (%)	83.2	80.8	75.6	71.0	76.1	77.8	78.9	78.7	82.4	82.0	82.8	84.7	79.5
Mean monthly sunshine hours	65.1	74.1	116.0	171.5	206.9	214.1	231.5	235.9	155.0	117.6	74.1	57.3	1,719
Source 1: Institute of Meteorology and Water Management
Source 2: Meteomodel.pl (records, relative humidity 1991–2020)

== Sites of interest ==
- Parish Church of the Visitation of the Most Blessed Virgin Mary (Kościół parafialny pw. Nawiedzenia Najświętszej Maryi Panny) - built in 1539 by Piotr Kmita Sobieński of the Kmita (Kmitowie) noble family that dominated the area. Built in the late gothic style, from stone and brick. Damaged by a Swedish attack during the Deluge, reconstructed. A Baroque interior from 1759 has survived. Reconstructed again in 1889, with a neogothic tower added. Next to the church a Baroque bell tower built from 1725 to 1764. Franciszek Pułaski (died 1769), cousin of general Kazimierz Pułaski, is buried in the church.
- Castle of the Kmita family, built in the sixteenth century, then reconstructed, partially destroyed and rebuilt. At one time, it was the home of the Polish poet Wincenty Pol. It now houses many works of notable European painters and writers.
- Lesko Synagogue - built in the first half of the 17th century, to replace an older wooden building. Its interior was destroyed during World War II by the Nazis. After the war, with no Jewish community left in Lesko, it fell into ruin. Gradually restored from 1960s onwards, it currently houses an art gallery.
- Kirkut (Jewish cemetery), with graves dating back to the sixteenth century. One of Poland's oldest Jewish cemeteries, it contains over 2,000 headstones.
- Town Hall building, which dates back to 1896.
- Lesko Stone, a popular geological formation.

== Gallery ==
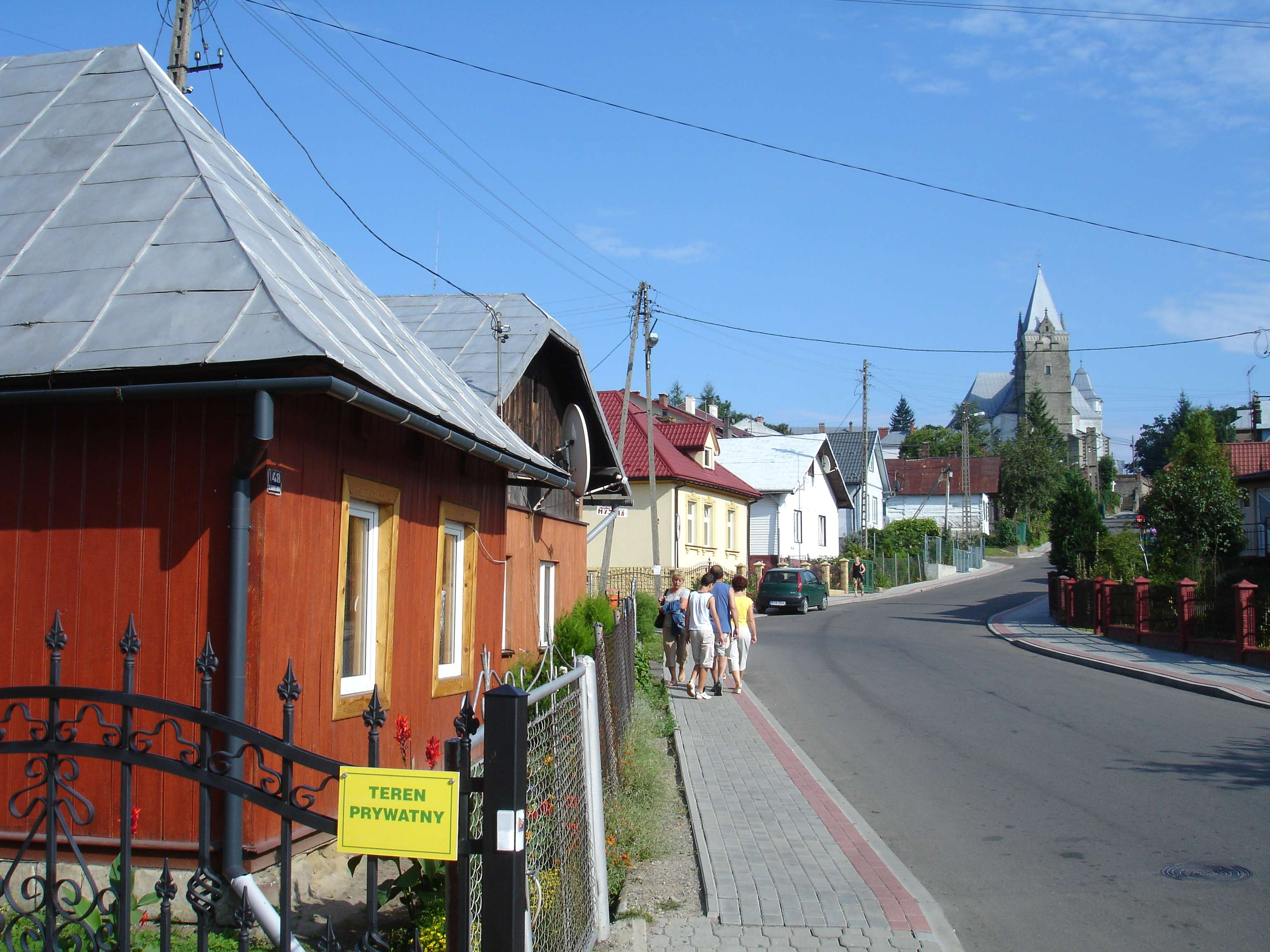
Street view of the local parish church in Lesko built in 1539 by the Kmita family

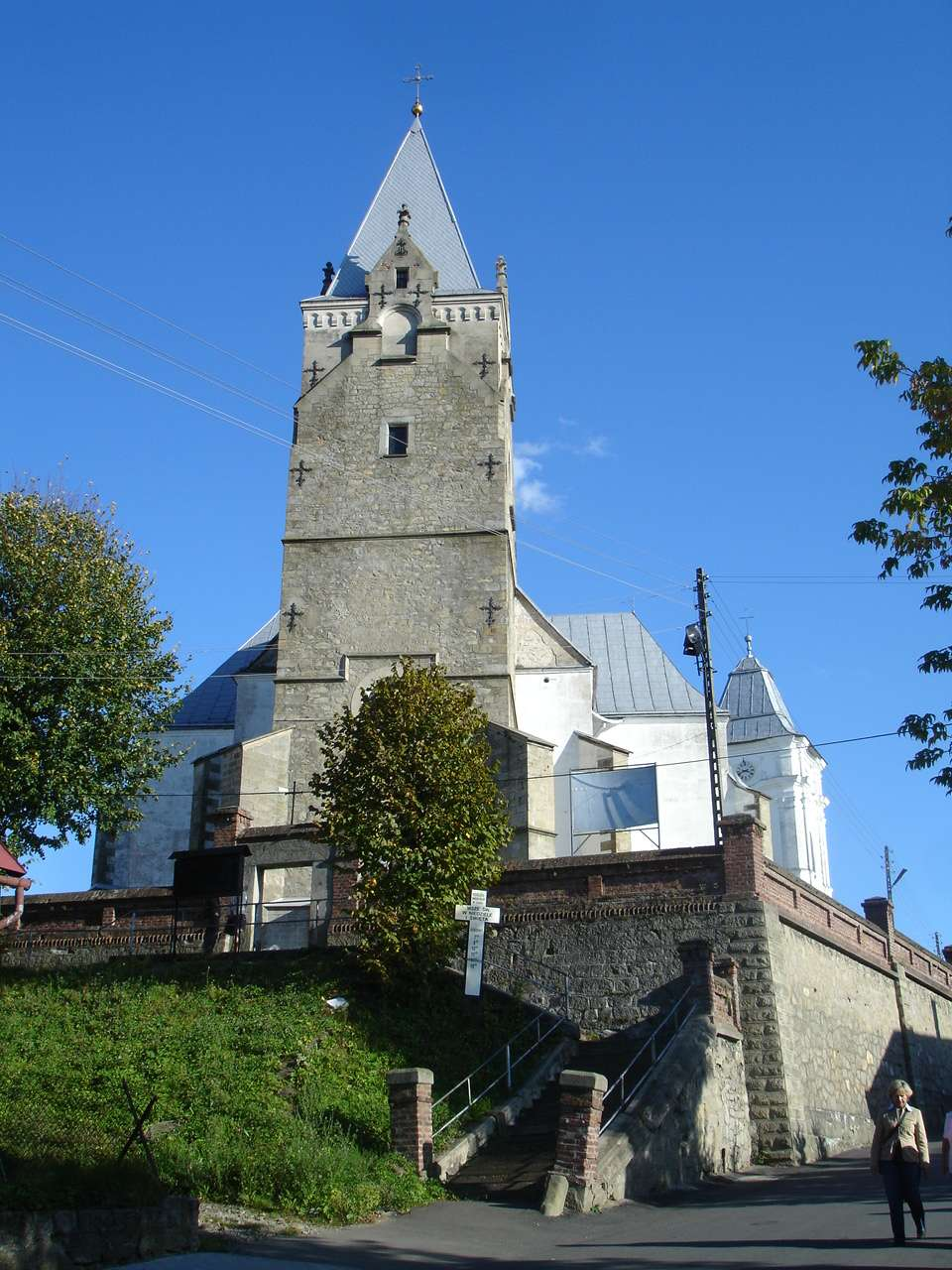
Gothic parish church of the Visitation of the Most Blessed Virgin Mary

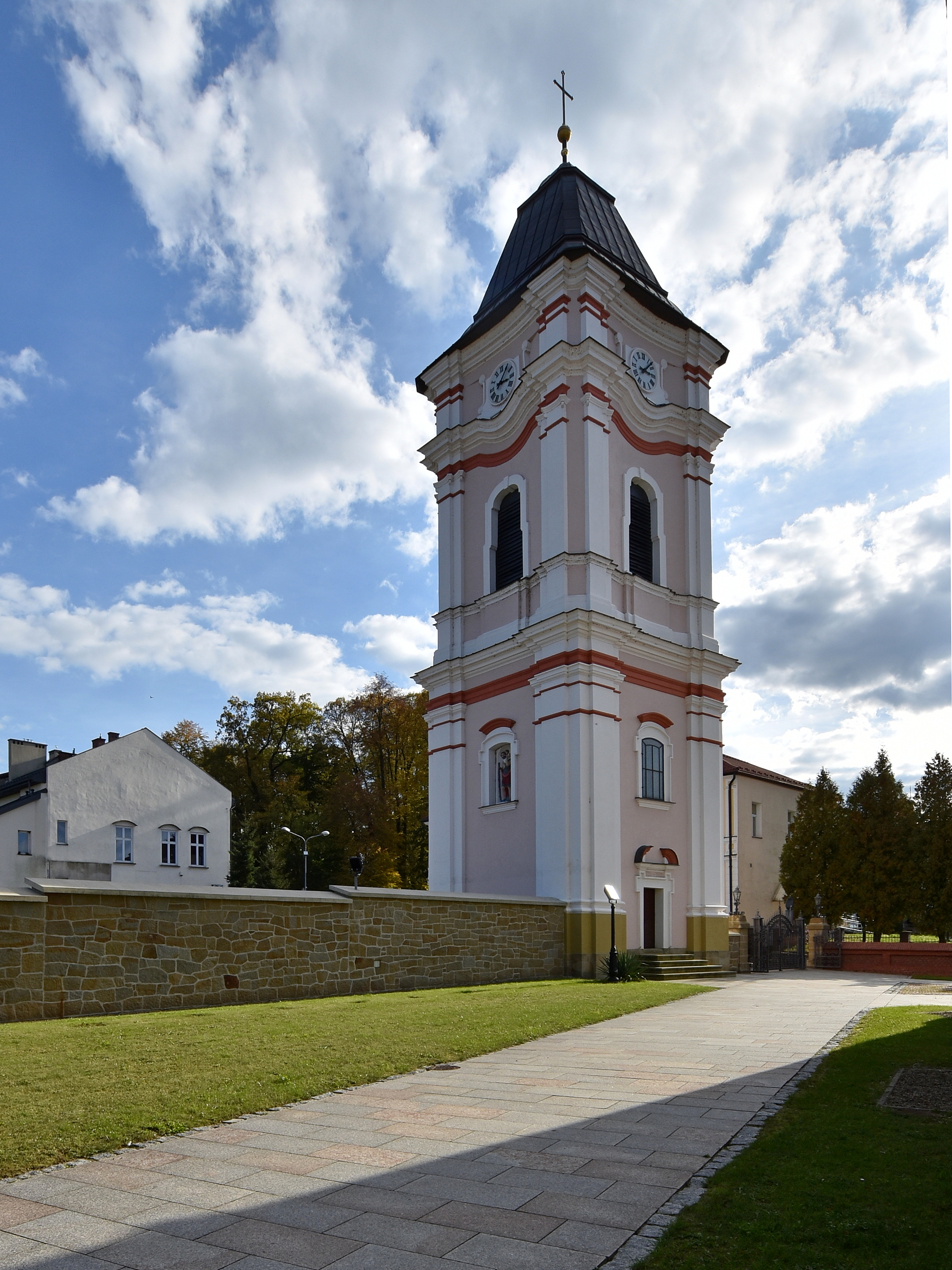
Baroque parish church bell tower

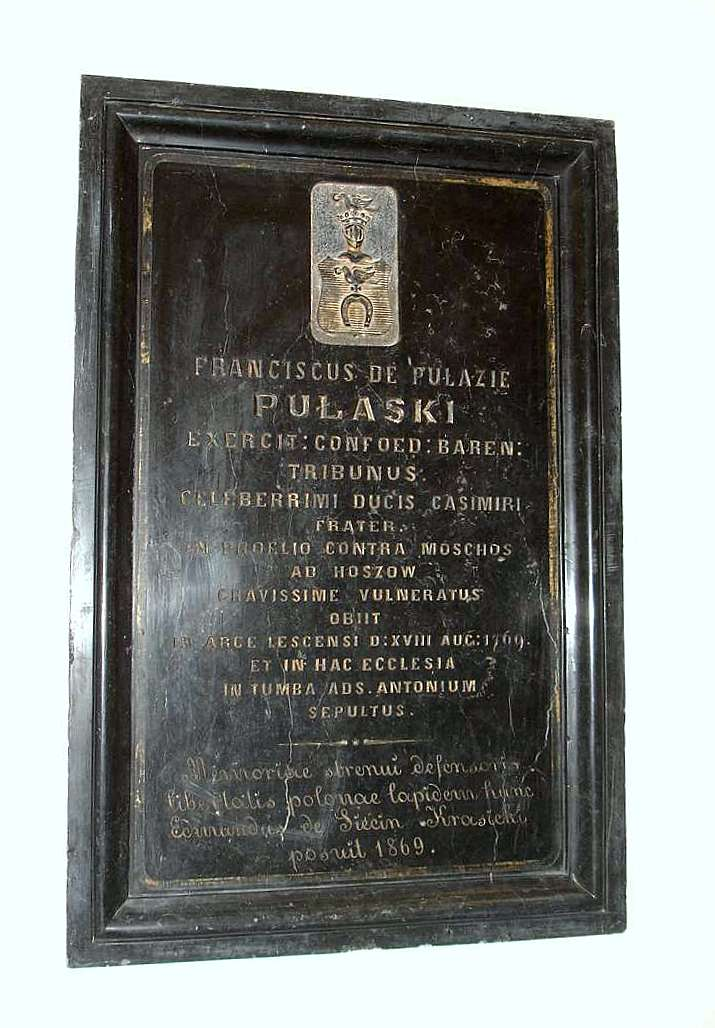
Franciszek Pulaski's cavalry captain - Kazimierz Pulaski's cousin memorial plaque inside parish church

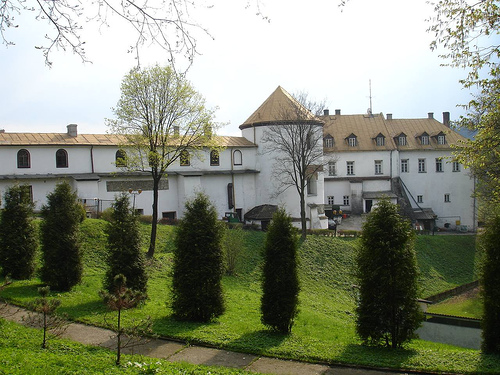
Kmita's castle

== Hiking trails ==
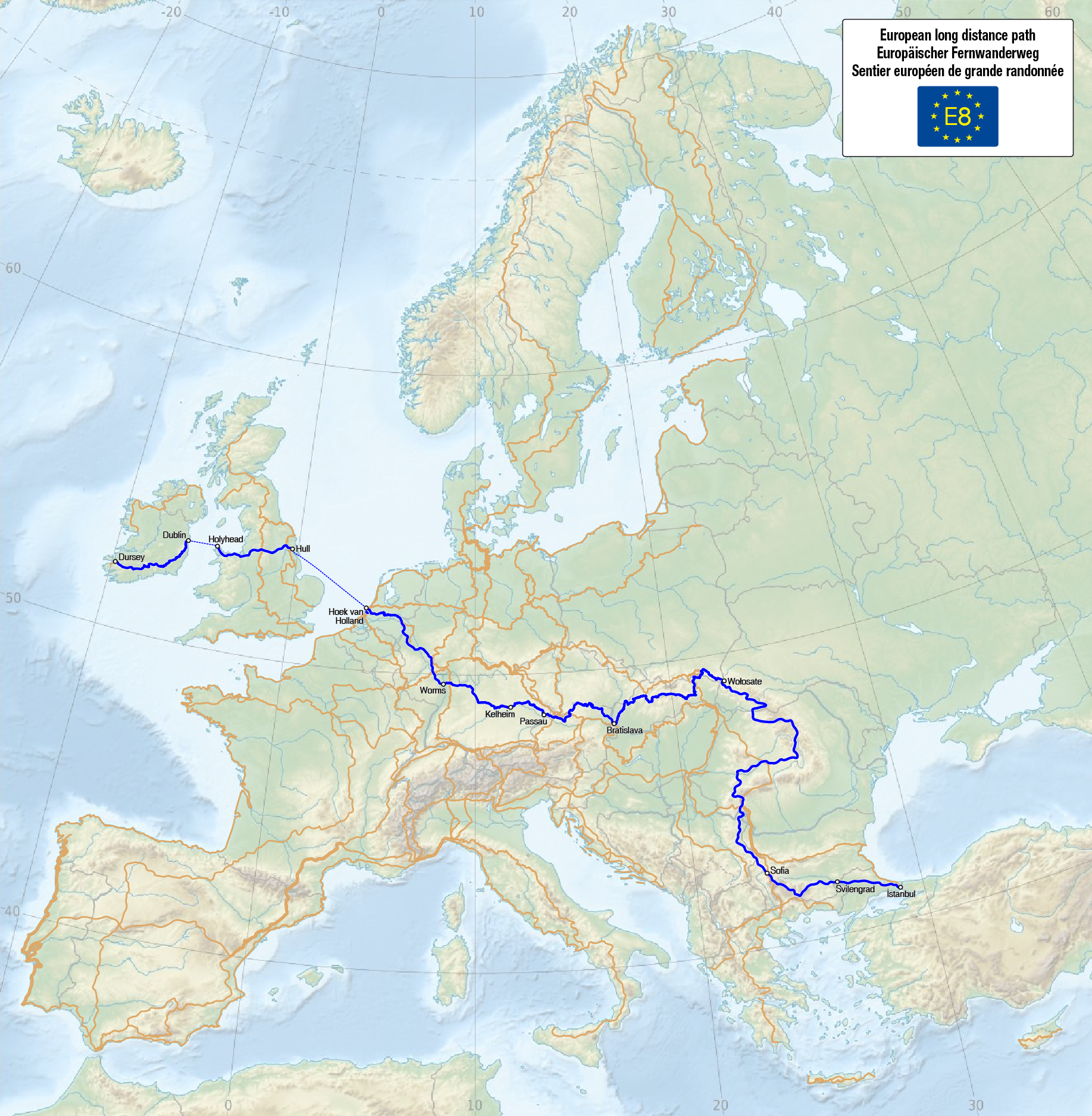
The European walking route E8

- European walking route E8

== Literature ==
- Prof. Adam Fastnacht. Slownik Historyczno-Geograficzny Ziemi Sanockiej w Średniowieczu (Historic-Geographic Dictionary of the Sanok District in the Middle Ages), Kraków, 2002, ISBN 83-88385-14-3.
