= Lesko Stone =

Coordinates: 49°27′45″N 22°21′43″E

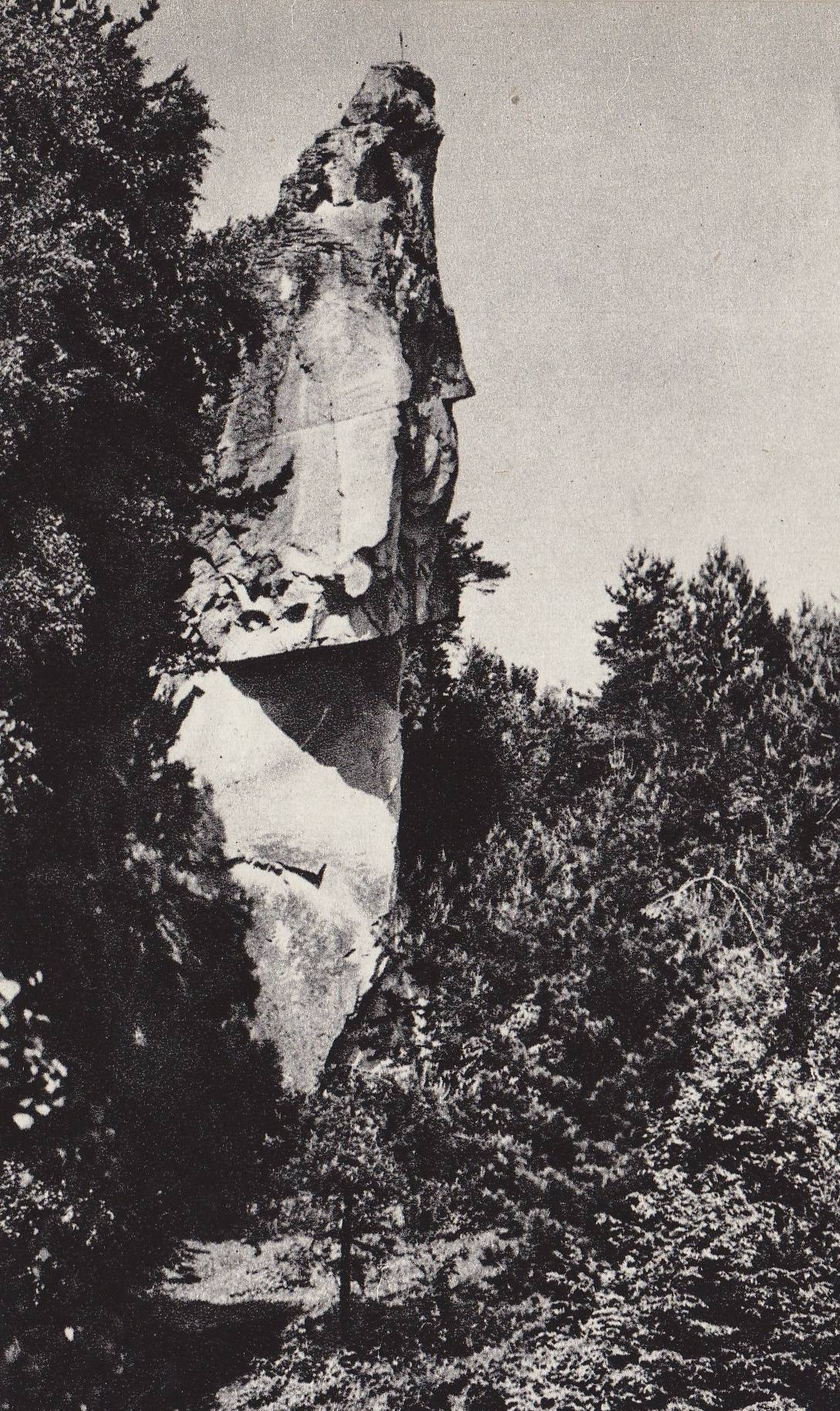
The Lesko Stone, pictured in 1968

The Lesko Stone (Polish: Kamień Leski) is a distinctive rock formation in the forest near the city of Lesko in the Bieszczady Mountains in Poland. It is most likely a result of glacial movements in the area and the whole formation is believed to have been carried to the present site by a glacier. The stone is over 65 feet (20 m) tall and is entirely a work of erosion. Its peculiar shape was further pronounced as the area was a small rock quarry in past centuries. Despite being an environmentally protected site it is often scaled by climbers and outdoor enthusiasts. It can be reached by following a lengthy tourist trail from Lesko or from a road roughly 300 feet (91 m) away.

Despite its name, it is located in the village of Glinne.

== Folklore ==
The stone is an important aspect of local culture with a number of legends related to its shape and origin. The most popular of those is related to the 16th century church in Lesko which claims the stone is a remnant of a failed attempt by the devil to destroy Christianity in the area. A variation of this story links the stone to a number of monasteries in the area. Many more legends exist and some of them are told on plaques currently fixed to the stone.

== Mentions in Culture ==
Because of its location on the main route through the Bieszczady Mountains the Lesko Stone is mentioned several times in literature. The stone's beauty was an inspiration for a poem specifically about it written by Aleksander Fredro and also appears in his other works. It was also written about by Oskar Kolberg, Stanisław Staszic, and Wincenty Pol among others.
