= Lesko (surname) =

Lesko or Leško is a surname. Notable people with the surname include:

- Adrián Leško (born 1995), Slovak footballer
- Anna Lesko (born 1979), American singer
- Artur Lesko (born 1984), Belarusian footballer
- Dávid Leško (born 1988), Slovak footballer
- Debbie Lesko (born 1958), American politician
- Ján Leško (born 1986), Slovak footballer
- John Charles Lesko, American convicted spree killer
- Leonard H. Lesko (born 1938), American Egyptologist
- Marina Lesko (born 1968), Russian journalist
- Mark Lesko (born 1967), American politician
- Matthew Lesko (born 1943), American author
- Peter Leško (born 1991), Slovak footballer
