= St. Michael Archangel's Church, Dębno =

Coordinates: 49.4665°N 20.2120°E

St. Michael Archangel's Church
- Kościół św. Michała Archanioła w Dębnie
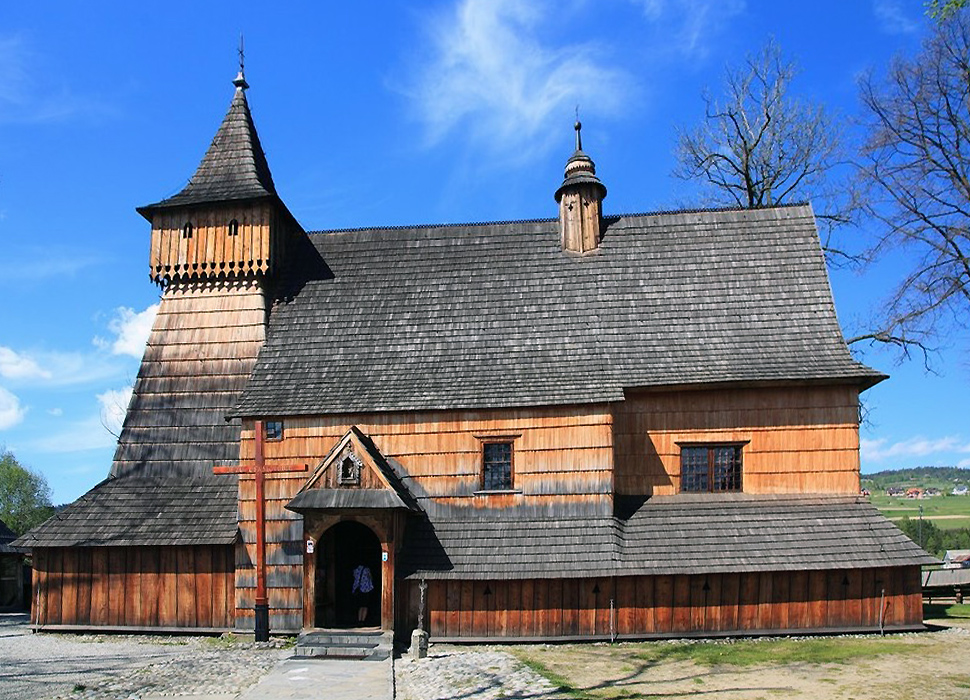
- St. Michael Archangel's Church
- Address: Dębno, Nowy Targ County
- Country: Poland
- Denomination: Roman Catholic Church

History
- Status: active church

Architecture
- Style: Gothic
- Years built: 15th century

UNESCO World Heritage Site
- Part of: Wooden Churches of Southern Małopolska
- Criteria: Cultural: (iii), (iv)
- Reference: 1053-003
- Inscription: 2003 (27th Session)

St. Michael Archangel's Church in Dębno is a Roman Catholic Gothic-wooden church located in the Polish Goral village of Dębno from the fifteenth-century. Together with different churches, it is designated as part of the UNESCO Wooden Churches of Southern Lesser Poland.

The first church in Dębno was most likely raised in the thirteenth-century. The present church was built in the second half of the fifteenth-century, in the location of the former church. The church is one of the best kept wooden Gothic churches in Poland, and is seen as a landmark of Poland internationally (nominated for the Seven Wonders of Poland). The church remains in its original structure, with a unique polychrome interior from around 1500, making it the oldest existing polychrome made from wood in Europe. The church is considered to be one of the oldest structures of its type in Poland, speculated to be second after the St. Michael Archangel's Church's tower in Binarowa.

In this church in the series Janosik, Maryna and Janosik take their wedding.
