= Polish Uplanders =

Polish Uplanders or Polish Highlanders may refer to:

- Pogórzanie
- Gorals of Poland
