= All Saints Church, Blizne =

Coordinates: 49.7511°N 21.9747°E

All Saints Church in Blizne
- Kościół Wszystkich Świętych w Bliznem
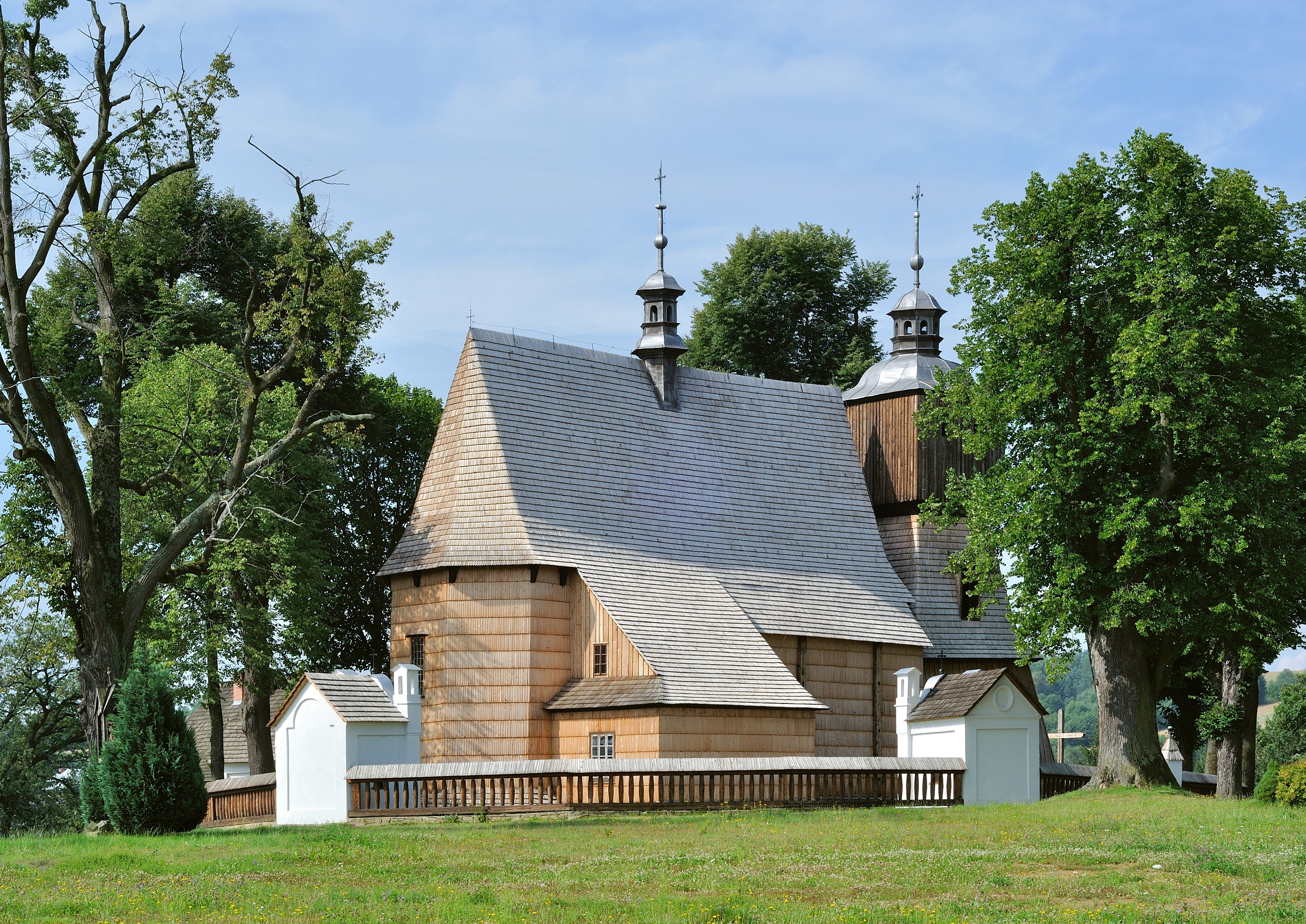
- All Saints Church in Blizne
- Address: Blizne
- Country: Poland
- Denomination: Roman Catholic Church

History
- Status: active church

Architecture
- Style: Gothic
- Years built: before 1470

UNESCO World Heritage Site
- Part of: Wooden Churches of Southern Małopolska
- Criteria: Cultural: (iii), (iv)
- Reference: 1053-002
- Inscription: 2003 (27th Session)

All Saints Church in Blizne - a Gothic, wooden church located in the village of Blizne from the fifteenth-century, which together with different churches is designated as part of the UNESCO Wooden Churches of Southern Lesser Poland.

The church in Blizne is one of the most notable heritage sites of wooden sacramental architecture in Poland, as one of the most notable wooden churches in Poland, the church is part of the Trail of Wooden Architecture in the Subcarpathian Voivodeship (Szlak Architektury Drewnianej).

== History ==
A unique church-parish complex situated on a hilltop, surrounded by ancient woodland. The wooden church has fortification structures, raised in the fifteenth or sixteenth-century (most likely prior to 1470), in the Gothic architectural style. The church's tower was built in the first half of the seventeenth-century, with the soboty (wooden undercut supported by pillars) deconstructed.

== Architecture ==
The church is built with the technology used to build a log house, built from fir planks. Initially, the church had a hook-block connection, characteristic of Lesser Poland architecture. A large bell tower is located to the west of the church, with hanging a starling. The dome of the church is covered with wood shingle. The church is surrounded by a garden with walled chapels.
