= Museum of Folk Architecture, Sanok =

The Museum of Folk Architecture in Sanok
- Muzeum Budownictwa Ludowego w Sanoku
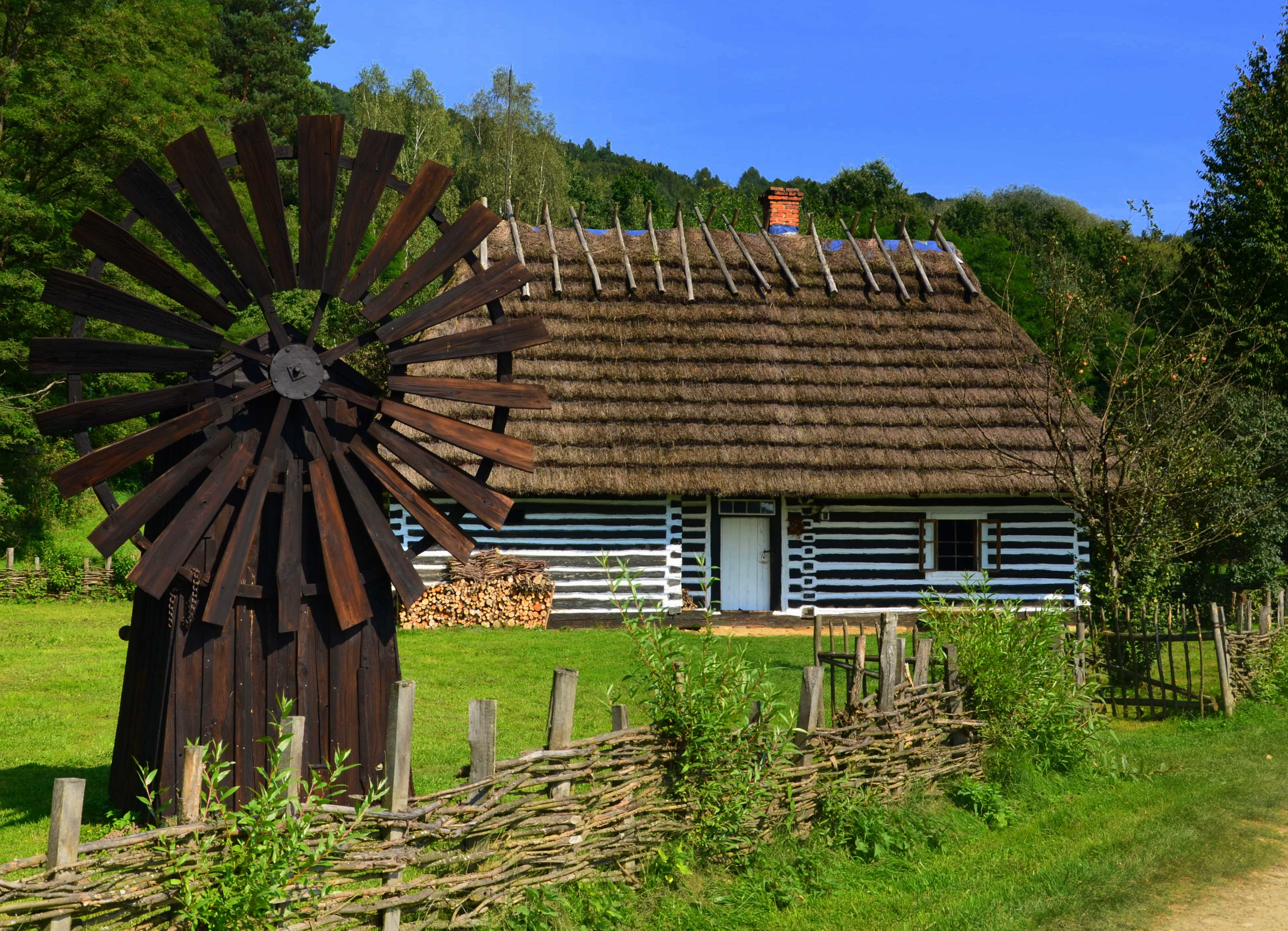
- Polish Uplanders (pl. Pogórzanie) wooden homes from 19th century
- Established: 1958
- Location: Sanok
- Coordinates: 49°34′27″N 22°12′29″E
- Type: Ethnographic open-air museum
- Visitors: 80000
- Director: Jerzy Ginalski
- Curator: prof. Jerzy Czajkowski
- Website: http://skansen.sanok.pl/

The Rural Architecture Museum of Sanok (Polish: Muzeum Budownictwa Ludowego w Sanoku) is one of the biggest open-air museums in Poland. It was established in 1958 by Aleksander Rybicki and contains 200 buildings which have been relocated from different areas of Sanok Land (Low Beskids, Pogórze Bukowskie, Doły Jasielsko Sanockie). The Sanok museum shows 19th and early 20th century life in this area of Poland.

== Story ==
The park is divided into distinct but similar-looking sections - each featuring an ethnic group who lived in the region prior to the post-World War II forced resettlements. People once called Rusyny/Ruthenians (Ukrainians) (Boykos, Lemkos and Dolinians) and Polish Uplanders (pl. Pogórzanie) homes and churches have been transported there from surrounding villages, restored to their original condition and furnished with authentic objects of the period.

The individual ethnographic groups (Boyko, Lemko, Pogórzanie and Dolinians) are arranged in separate sections which perfectly fit the landscape physiography: the Bojko and Lemko architecture was located in the upper part of the park, whereas that of the Pogórzanie and in the upper part of the area.

One can go inside many of the buildings including several homes, a school house and a Roman Catholic or Greek-Catholic church. The museum also possesses a large photographic archive, including authentic photos from the 19th and 20th centuries.

== Galician market square ==
The ethnographic museum in Sanok has undergone a major transformation in the last two years. A "new" Rynek (Town Square) has been built just inside the entrance. It is a replica of a Galician town square from the second half of the 19th century, inhabited by Polish Jewish and Rusyn populations. Besides reconstructed houses from various Subcarpathian towns, there is also a genuine Jewish house, firehouse, tavern, post-office, chemist's, shop, barber's and others. The exhibits include replicas of typical Galician houses from Dębowiec, Jaśliska, Sanok, Jaćmierz, Niebylec, Jedlicze, Bircza, Rybotycze, Sokołów Małopolski, Brzozów, Stara Wieś, Ustrzyki Dolne, and Golcowa.

This skansen is interesting because it includes sections devoted to the various ethnic groups who inhabited the Bieszczady area prior to World War II and Akcja Wisla.

Its Address is 38-500 Sanok, street Traugutta 3. The entrance to the museum is across the bridge over the river San (Rybicki street). Parking is available near the museum, which is open year-round.

== See also ==
- Hvisdets Synagogue

== Sources ==
- Jerzy Ginalski, Marian Kraczkowski. Skansen w Sanoku. 2002
