= Pogórzanie =

Polish ethnic group

Pogorzans
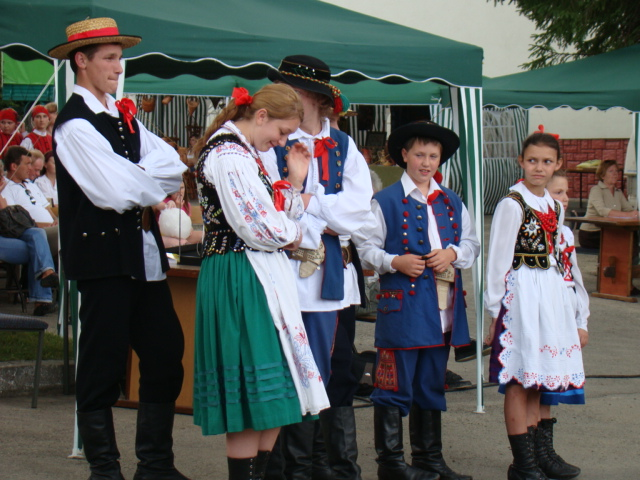
- Pogorzans from Bukowsko, Bukowianie, a local Polish folk music group

Total population
- 700 000 (est.)

Regions with significant populations
- Poland: 500,000
- United States: 200,000

Languages
- Polish

Religion
- Predominantly Roman Catholic, with Protestant minorities

Related ethnic groups
- Gorals and other Poles, Rusyns

Pogorzans (Polish: Pogórzanie; also known as Western Pogorzans and Eastern Pogorzans), are an ethnographic group of Poles that mostly live in the Central Beskidian Range of the Subcarpathian highlands. The Pogorzans inhabit the central and the southern half of the Beskids in Poland, including the Ciężkowickie, Strzyżowskie and Dynowskie Plateau as well as Doły Jasielsko-Sanockie, from the White River (Biała) in the west to the San River in the east.

They represent the major population group inhabiting the Subcarpathian Voivodeship, living alongside German and Rusyn people. Historically, this region formed part of Galicia.

Pogorzans are neighbours with: the Lachy sądeckie to the west; Krakowiacy and Rzeszowiacy to the north; and Dolinians (vale-dwellers, people of mixed Polish-Rusyn origin) and Lemkos (Rusyn subgroup) to the south.

Cultural subdivisions of the Pogorzans distinguish the western Pogorzans (the area of Gorlice, Jasło and Dukla) from the eastern Pogorzans (Strzyżów, Krosno and Brzozów). The border between those two groups lies on the west from Krosno and Strzyżów. The differences between western and eastern groups were especially seen in architecture and in clothing.

Traditional occupations of the Pogorzans included agriculture, oil-mining and the military; today these are joined by the service and petroleum industries, and by agrotourism. Polish scholars regard the Pogórzan dialect as part of the Lesser Polish dialect cluster.

== Eastern Pogorzan landscape ==
Blizne, Subcarpathia (Red Ruthenia) (c. 1450)	Haczów, Subcarpathia (Red Ruthenia) (1388) c. 1624	Binarowa, Subcarpathia (1400) c. 1500

== History ==
In 1854 in the village Bóbrka near Krosno, the first oil field in the world began production.

== See also ==
- Gorals
- Museum of Folk Architecture, Sanok
- Rusyns

== Bibliography ==
- Michael Burleigh. Germany Turns Eastwards: A Study of Ostforschung in the Third Reich. Cambridge: Cambridge University Press. 1988. ISBN 978-0521351201
- Ernst Schwarz. Von den "Walddeutschen" in Galizien, "Schlesien" Jh. V. Z. III. S. 147–156.
- Wojciech Blajer. Bemerkungen zum Stand der Forschungen uber die Enklawen der mittelalterlichen deutschen Besiedlung zwischen Wisłoka und San. [in:] Późne średniowiecze w Karpatach polskich. red. Prof. Jan Gancarski. Krosno. 2007. ISBN 978-83-60545-57-7
