= St. Leonard's Church, Lipnica Murowana =

Coordinates: 49.8604°N 20.5306°E

St. Leonard's Church in Lipnica Murowana
- Kościół św. Leonarda w Lipnicy Murowanej
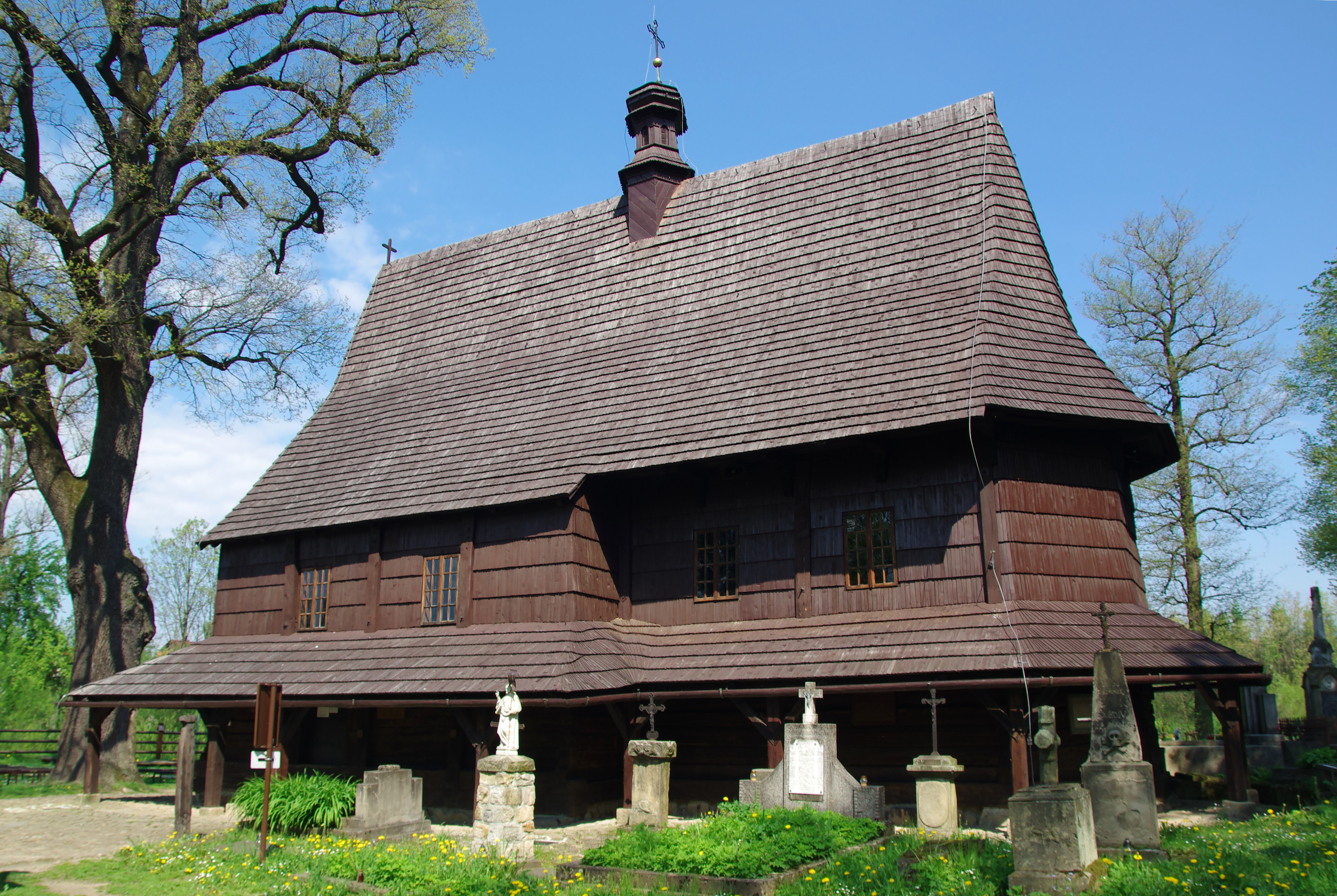
- St. Leonard's Church in Lipnica Murowana
- Address: Lipnica Murowana
- Country: Poland
- Denomination: Roman Catholic Church

History
- Status: active church

Architecture
- Style: Gothic
- Years built: end of the 15 century

Administration
- Diocese: Roman Catholic Diocese of Tarnów

UNESCO World Heritage Site
- Part of: Wooden Churches of Southern Małopolska
- Criteria: Cultural: (iii), (iv)
- Reference: 1053-005
- Inscription: 2003 (27th Session)

St. Leonard's Church in Lipnica Murowana is a Gothic, wooden church located in the village of Lipnica Murowana from the fifteenth-century, which together with different churches is designated as part of the UNESCO Wooden Churches of Southern Lesser Poland.

== History ==
The church is located by the Uszwica river, beyond the former levee in Lipnica Murowana. The church was most likely built at the end of the fifteenth-century, on the location of a former church. According to the town's tradition, the church was built in 1143 or 1203 - this date can be seen on the north-east wall of the chancel - in the location of a former pagan chram.

The church is found today in a near untouched structure, and belongs to the most notable wooden Gothic churches in Poland. The church is orientated, built from wooden framework, bipartite. The chancel is surrounded by three walls. The nave is wider, in the shape of a square. In the seventeenth-century, the church was surrounded with picturesque soboty (wooden undercut supported by pillars), during which a bell tower was constructed. There is no sacristy by the chancel. The roof is covered with wood shingle, with tradition, there are only windows in the southern side of the church, with the entrance doors to the south and west of the church.

== Gallery ==
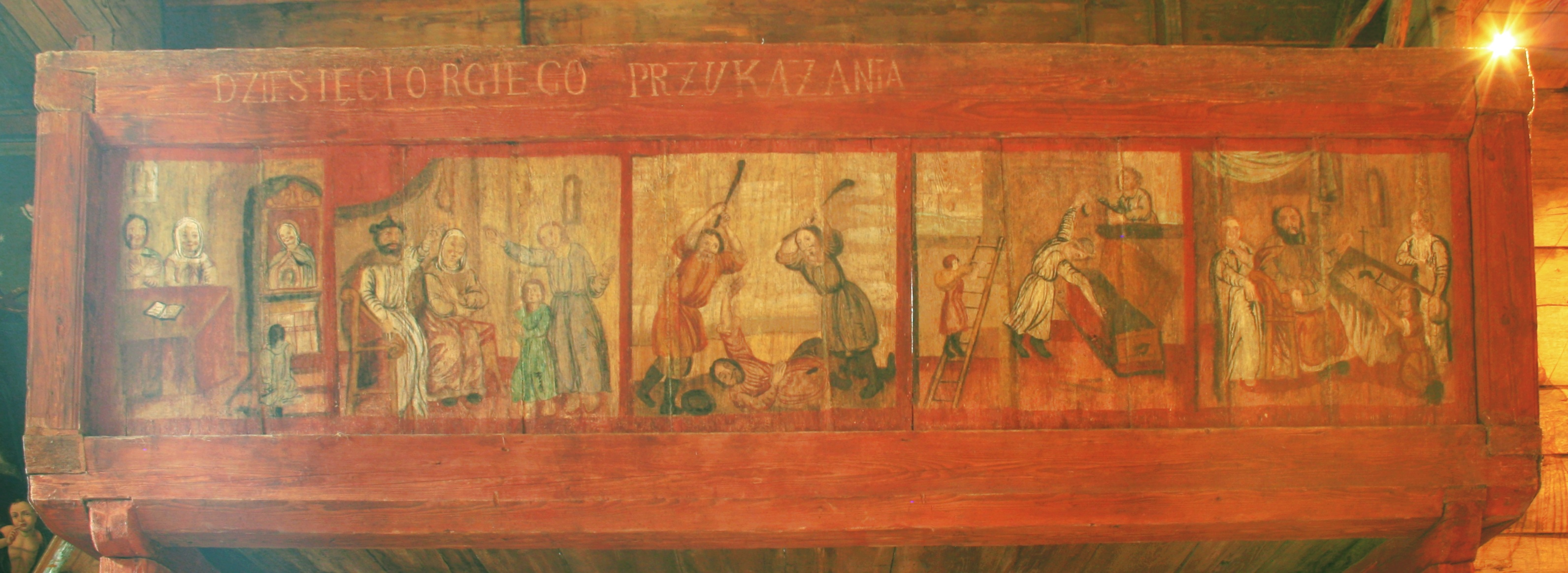
Polychrome illustrating the Ten Commandments.

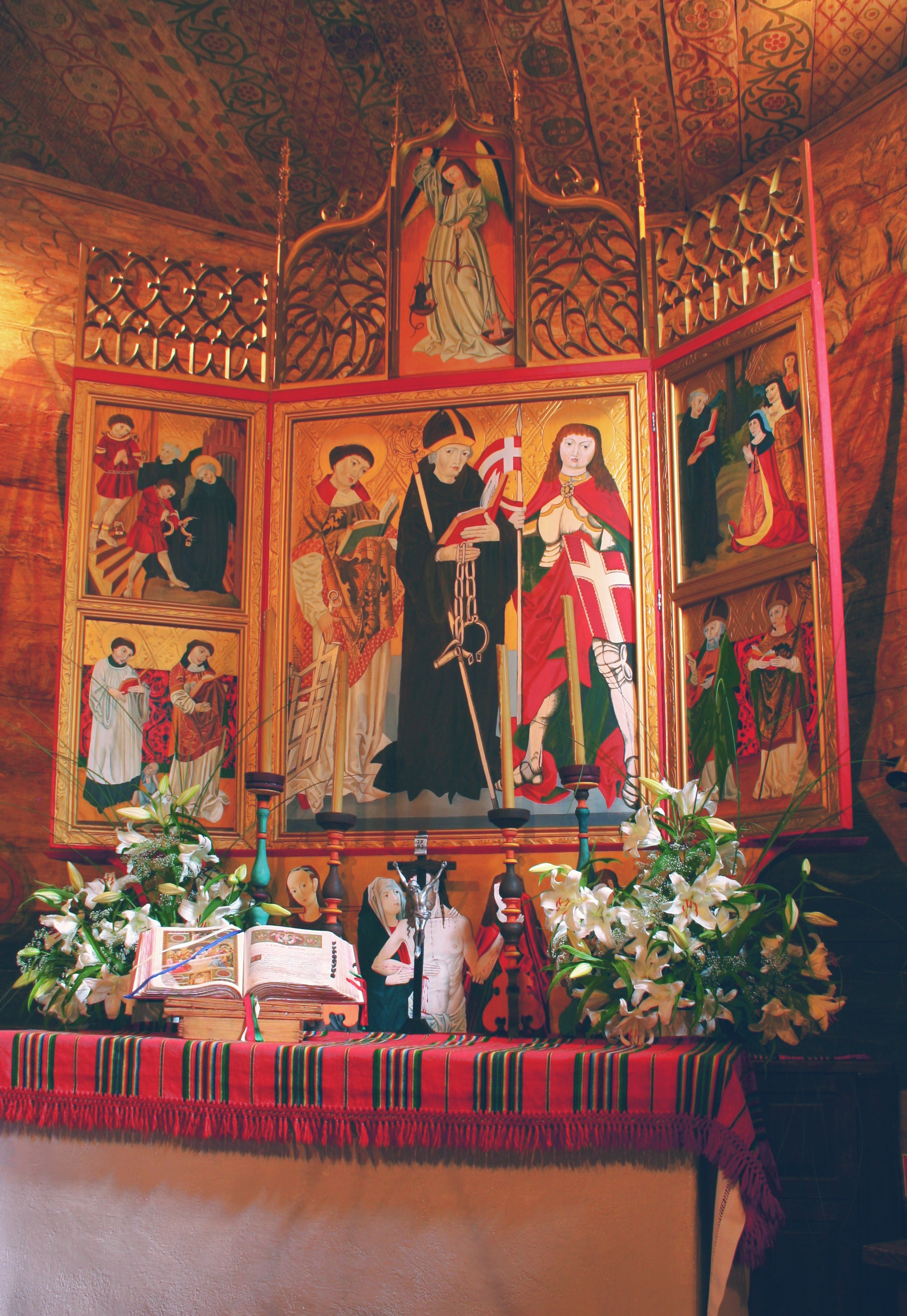
Altar with St. Leonard.

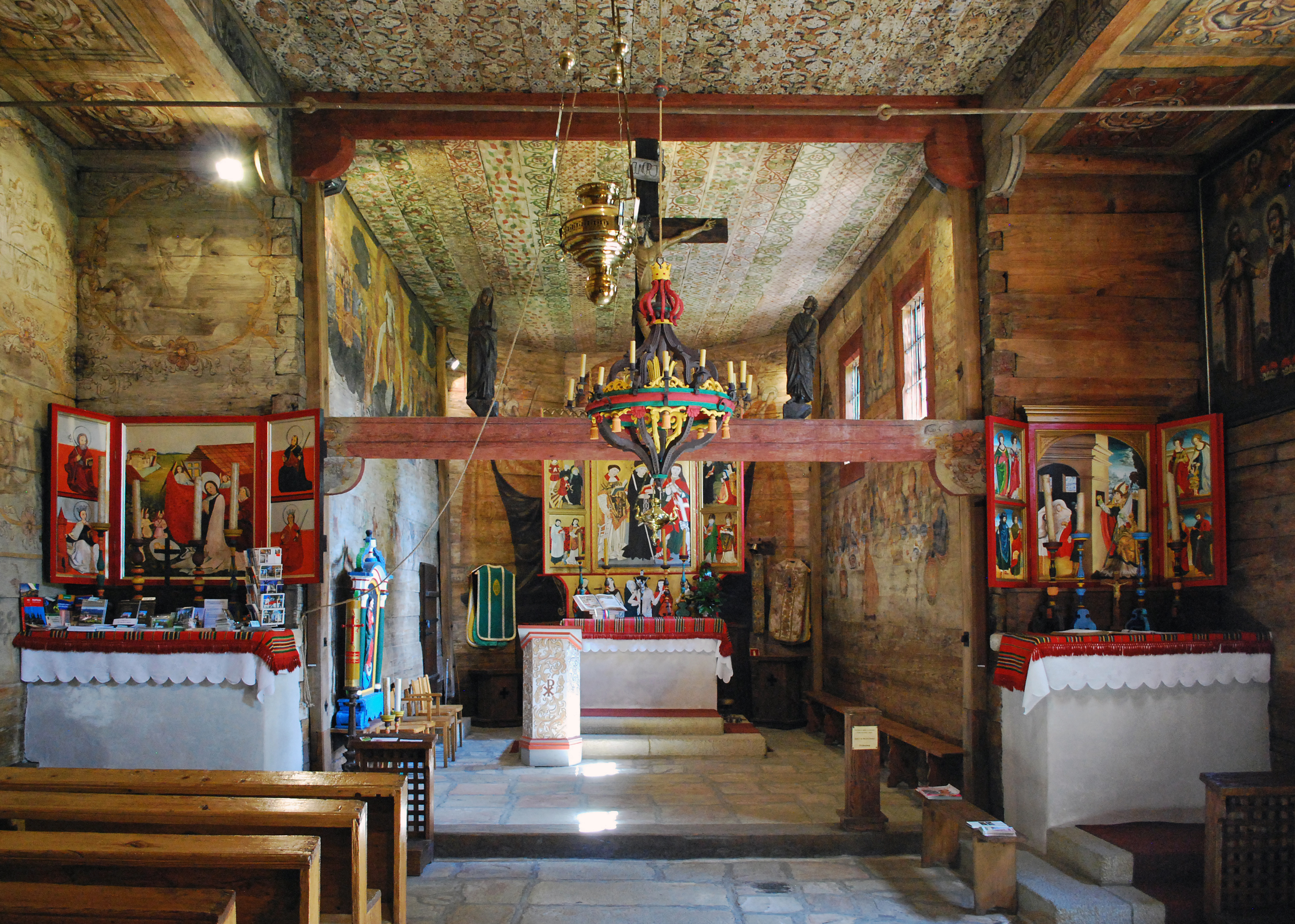
Interior of the church.
