= Saints Philip and James Church, Sękowa =

Coordinates: 49.6305°N 21.1861°E

Saints Philip and Jacob Church in Sękowa
- Kościół św. Filipa i św. Jakuba w Sękowej
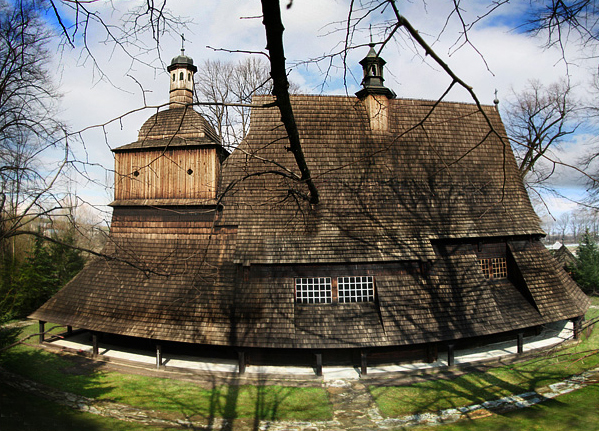
- Saints Philip and Jacob Church in Sękowa
- Address: Sękowa
- Country: Poland
- Denomination: Roman Catholic Church

History
- Status: active church

Architecture
- Style: Gothic
- Completed: c. 1520

UNESCO World Heritage Site
- Part of: Wooden Churches of Southern Małopolska
- Criteria: Cultural: (iii), (iv)
- Reference: 1053-006
- Inscription: 2003 (27th Session)

Saints Philip and James Church is a Gothic, wooden church in the village of Sękowa from the 15th century. Together with different churches it is designated as the UNESCO Wooden Churches of Southern Lesser Poland. Due to its history and unique architecture the church is frequently called the Pearl of the Beskid Niski (Perła Beskidu Niskiego).

== History ==
The church is a nave, three-sided chancel, wooden framework church, built on gravel foundations. The larch walls of the church are covered with wood shingle. The narrow chancel and wide nave is covered by a steep roof. The church was expanded in the seventeenth-century (construction of the column-framework tower, topped out with a dome, and accessible from the ground, with soboty (wooden undercut supported by pillars); the side of the church has a small bell tower, with a lantern). In 1819, the sacristy and matroneum was reconstructed, before 1888, covered in a Neo-Gothic polychrome. The interior in the nave is covered with flat slabs, which change in shape, with a rectangular window in the arch, with a wooden crucifix from the sixteenth-century.

The interior of the church is not complete, as the church was damaged during 1914–1915 years of World War I, in the Gorlice–Tarnów Offensive (the wooden material was used for trenches and for firewood). After World War I, the church was reconstructed in 1918, and in the second half of the twentieth-century.
