= Sękowa =

- village
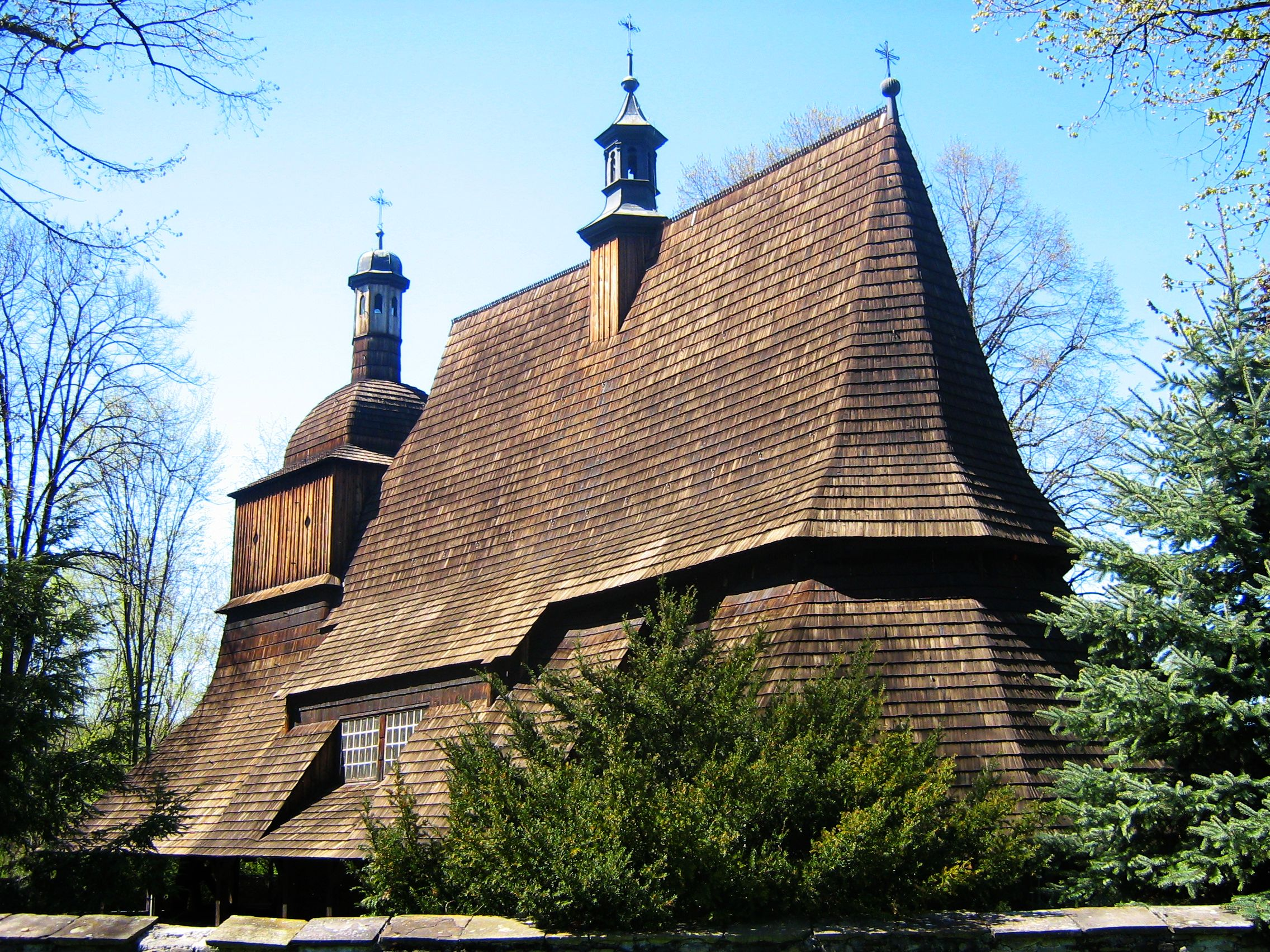
- Church of St. Philip and St. Jacob, from 1520

- Location within Poland
- Coordinates: 49°36′N 21°12′E
- Country: Poland
- Voivodeship: Lesser Poland
- County: Gorlice
- Commune: Sękowa
- Population: 4,889
- Time zone: UTC+1
  - Summer (DST): UTC+2

Sękowa (Polish: [sɛŋˈkɔva]) is a historic village in southern Poland first incorporated by an edict issued on February 22, 1363, by King Kazimierz Wielki.

The village is the site of St. Philip's and St. James' church, built in the beginning of the 16th century, one of the six Wooden churches of Southern Lesser Poland, inscribed on the UNESCO list of World Heritage Sites since 2003.

Sękowa is the seat of rural Gmina Sękowa, administrative district in Gorlice County, Lesser Poland Voivodeship, on the Polish Slovak border.

UNESCO World Heritage Site

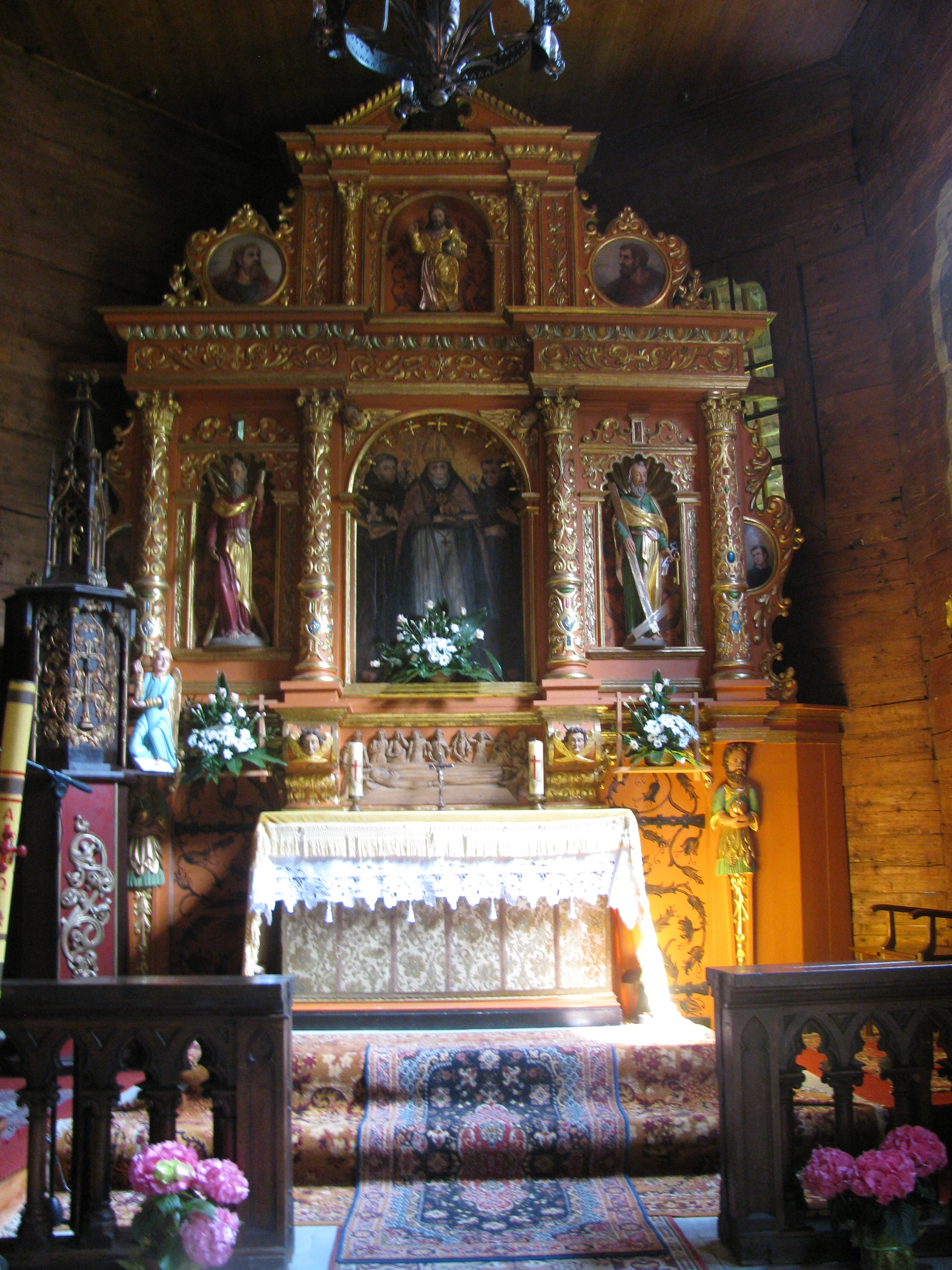
Hand-carved Main altar

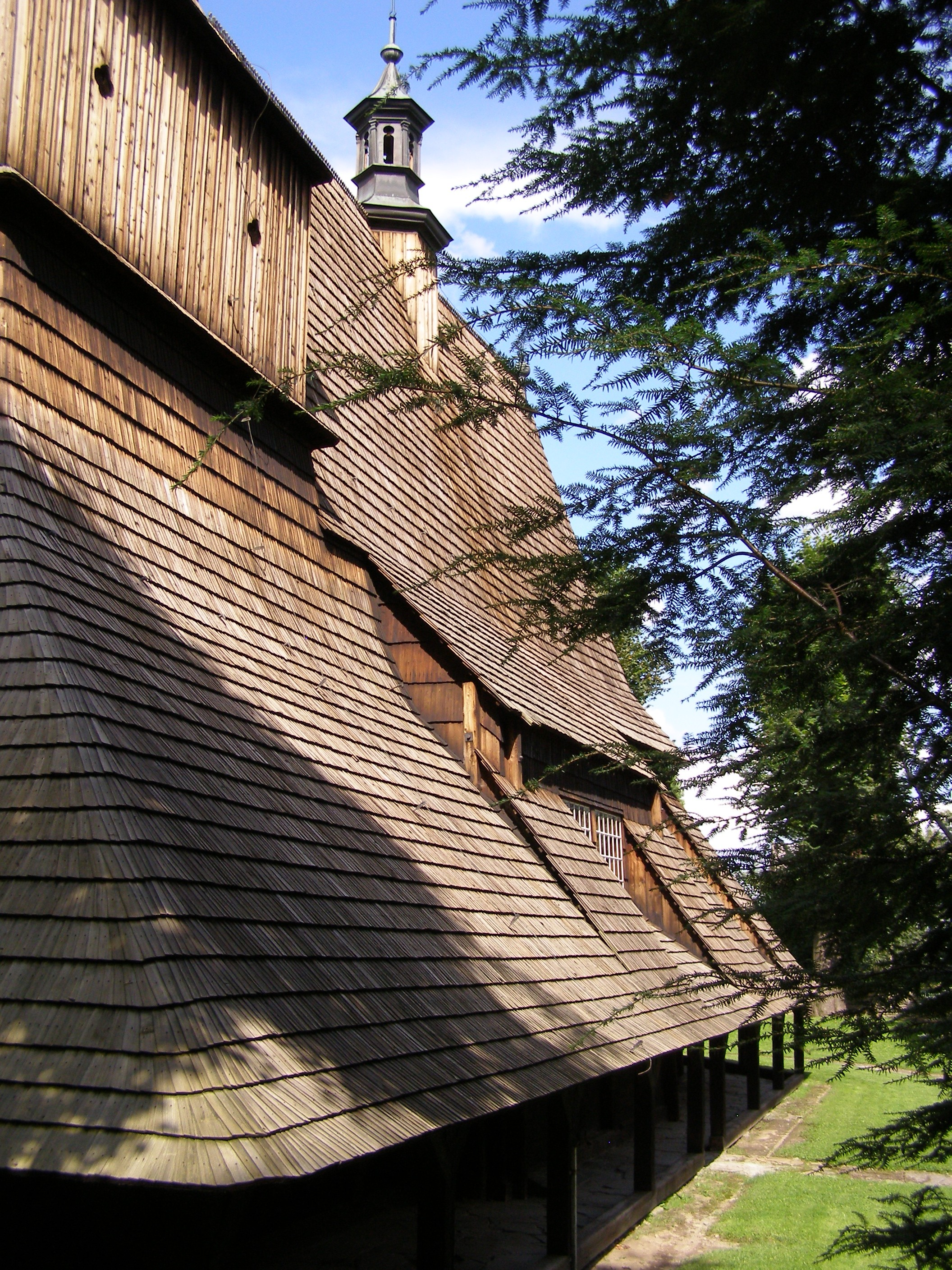
Woodwork

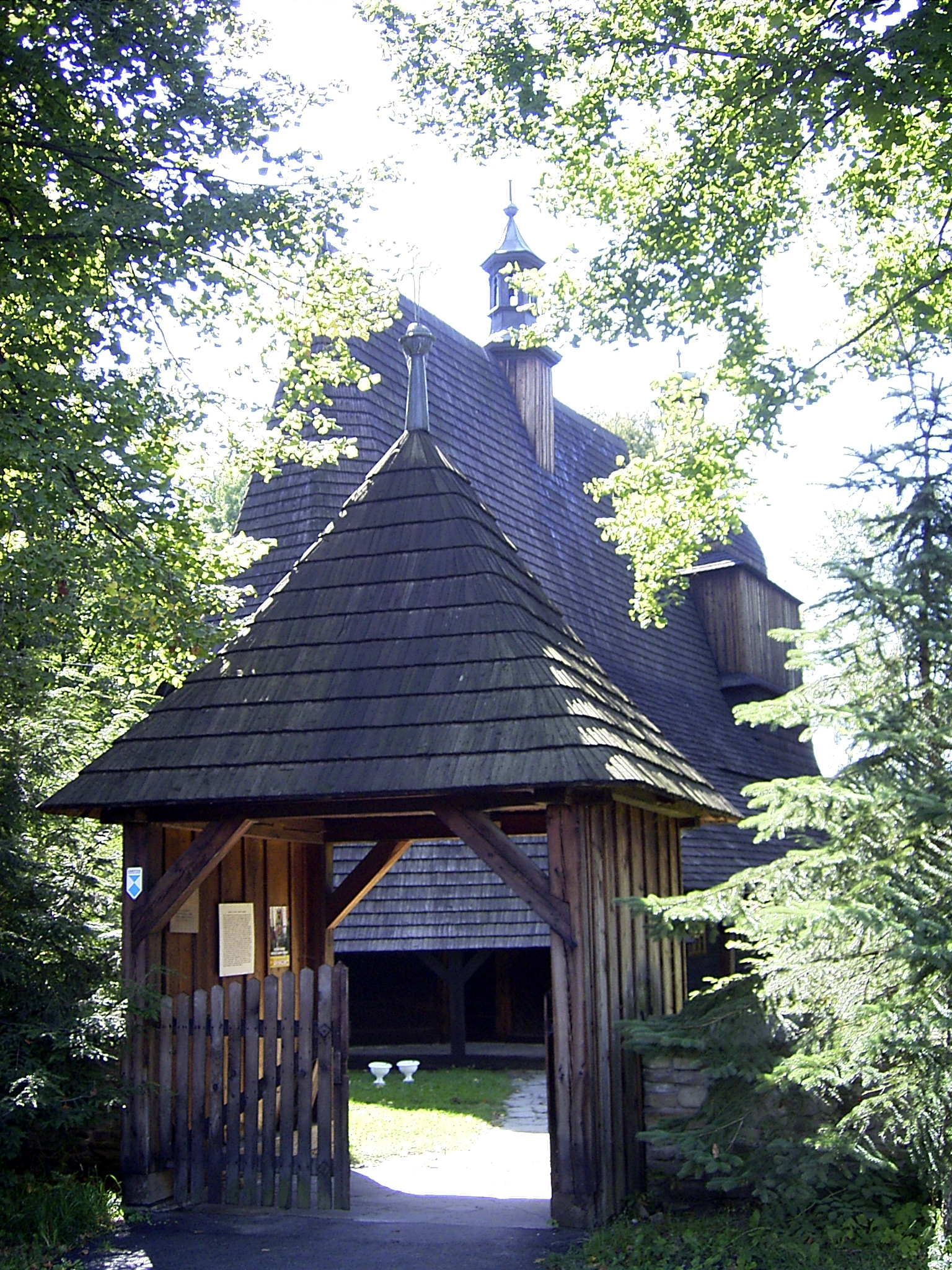
Gate to Church grounds
