= Gmina Domaradz =

Gmina Domaradz Domaradz Commune
- Gmina
- Flag Coat of arms
- Interactive map of Gmina Domaradz
- Coordinates: 49°47′40″N 21°59′10″E
- Country: Poland
- Voivodeship: Subcarpathian
- County: Brzozów
- Seat: Domaradz

Area
  - Total: 56.12 km^{2} (21.67 sq mi)

Population (2006)
  - Total: 6,059
  - Density: 108.0/km^{2} (279.6/sq mi)
- Website: http://www.domaradz.pl/

Gmina Domaradz is a rural gmina (administrative district) in Brzozów County, Subcarpathian Voivodeship, in south-eastern Poland. Its seat is the village of Domaradz, which lies approximately 12 kilometres (7 mi) north-west of Brzozów and 28 km (17 mi) south of the regional capital Rzeszów.

The gmina covers an area of 56.12 square kilometres (21.7 sq mi), and as of 2006 its total population is 6,059.

== Villages ==
The gmina contains the villages of Domaradz, Barycz and Golcowa.

== Neighbouring gminas ==
Gmina Domaradz is bordered by the gminas of Błażowa, Brzozów, Jasienica Rosielna, Niebylec and Nozdrzec.
