= Wooden churches of Southern Lesser Poland =

UNESCO World Heritage Site

Wooden Churches of Southern Małopolska
UNESCO World Heritage Site
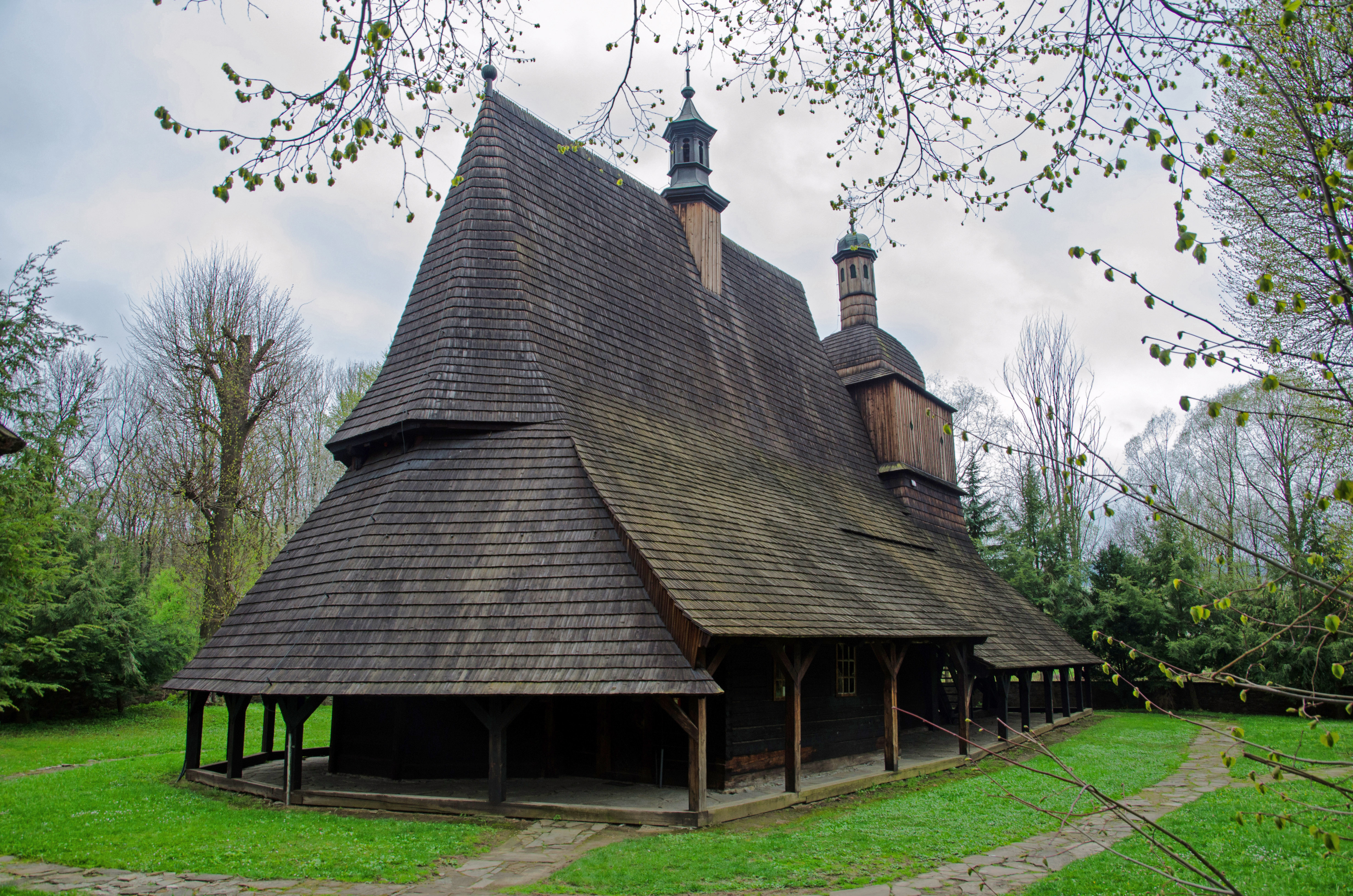
- Old church in Sękowa
- Interactive map of Wooden Churches of Southern Małopolska
- Location: Lesser Poland Voivodeship and Podkarpackie Voivodeship, Poland
- Includes: 1. Church of the Archangel Michael, Binarowa; 2. Church of All Saints, Blizne; 3. Church of the Archangel Michael, Dębno; 4. Church of the Assumption of the Blessed Virgin Mary and the Archangel Michael, Haczów; 5. Church of St Leonard, Lipnica Murowana; 6. Church of St Philip and St James the Apostles, Sękowa
- Criteria: Cultural: (iii), (iv)
- Reference: 1053rev
- Inscription: 2003 (27th Session)
- Area: 8.26 ha (20.4 acres)
- Buffer zone: 242 ha (600 acres)
- Coordinates: 49°45′N 21°14′E

The wooden churches of southern Lesser Poland (Polish: drewniane kościoły południowej Małopolski) of the UNESCO inscription are located in Binarowa, Blizne, Dębno, Haczów, Lipnica Murowana, and Sękowa (Lesser Poland Voivodeship or Małopolska).

There are in fact many others of the region which fit the description: "The wooden churches of southern Little Poland represent outstanding examples of the different aspects of medieval church-building traditions in Roman Catholic culture. Built using the horizontal log technique, common in eastern and northern Europe since the Middle Ages..."

The wooden church style of the region originated in the late Medieval, the late sixteenth century, and began with Gothic ornament and polychrome detail, but because they were timber construction, the structure, general form, and feeling is entirely different from the gothic architecture or Polish Gothic (in stone or brick). Later construction show Rococo and Baroque ornamental influence. The form of these Roman Catholic churches is deeply influenced by the Greco-Catholic and Orthodox presence in the region. Some display Greek cross plans and onion domes, but the most interesting of the churches combine these features with the Roman forms with elongated naves and steeples.

Other collections of wooden churches of the region are in the open-air museums in Sanok and Nowy Sącz.

== Location map ==
Wooden churches of Southern Lesser Poland

== List of the sites ==
Picture	ID	Name	Location	Note
	1053-001	St. Michael Archangel's Church, Binarowa	Binarowa	From circa 1500
	1053-002	All Saints Church, Blizne	Blizne	East of Jasienica Rosielna
	1053-003	St. Michael the Archangel Church	Dębno, Nowy Targ County	From 15th century
	1053-004	Assumption of Holy Mary Church	Haczów	The oldest wooden gothic temple in Europe, 1388
	1053-005	St. Leonard's Church	Lipnica Murowana	From 15th century
	1053-006	Saints Philip and James Church	Sękowa	From 1520

== Other wooden churches of the region ==
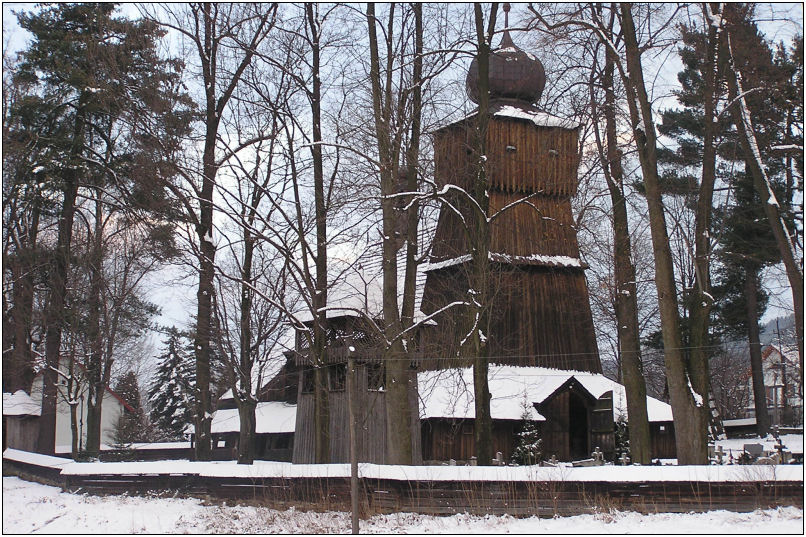
Church of Sts. Peter and Paul in Lachowice, 1789-1791

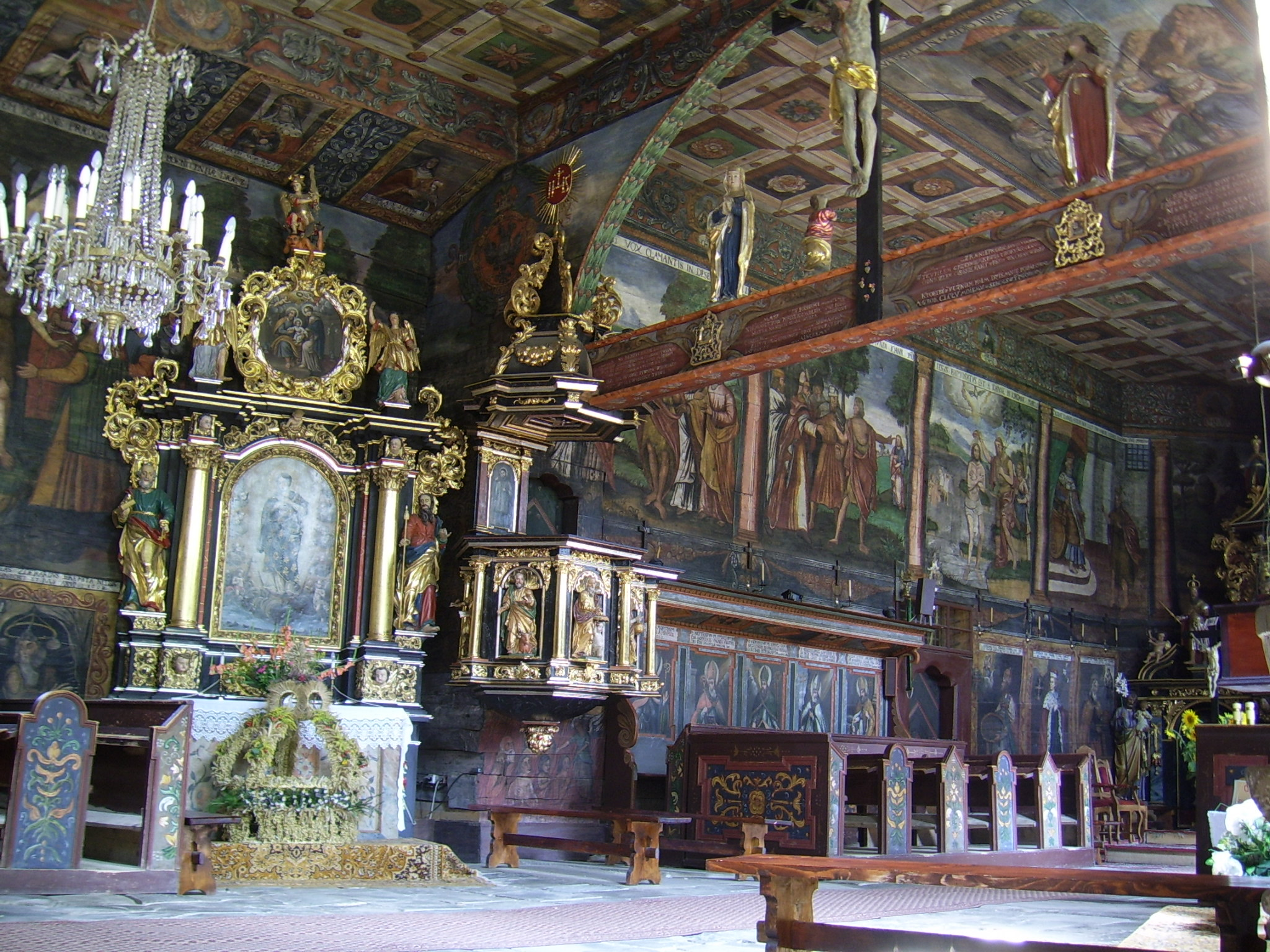
John the Baptist Church in Orawka, interior

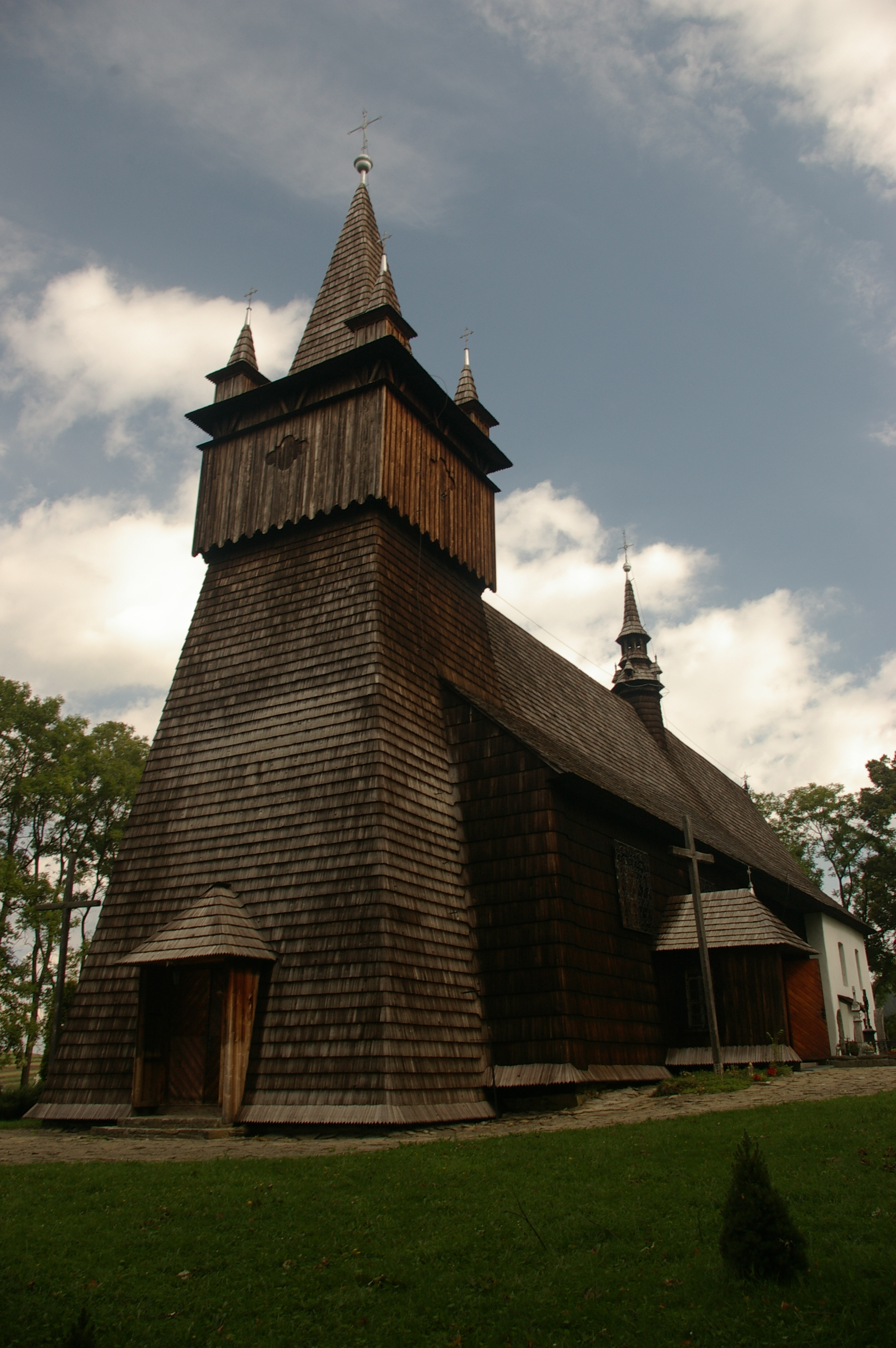
John the Baptist Church in Orawka, circa 1750

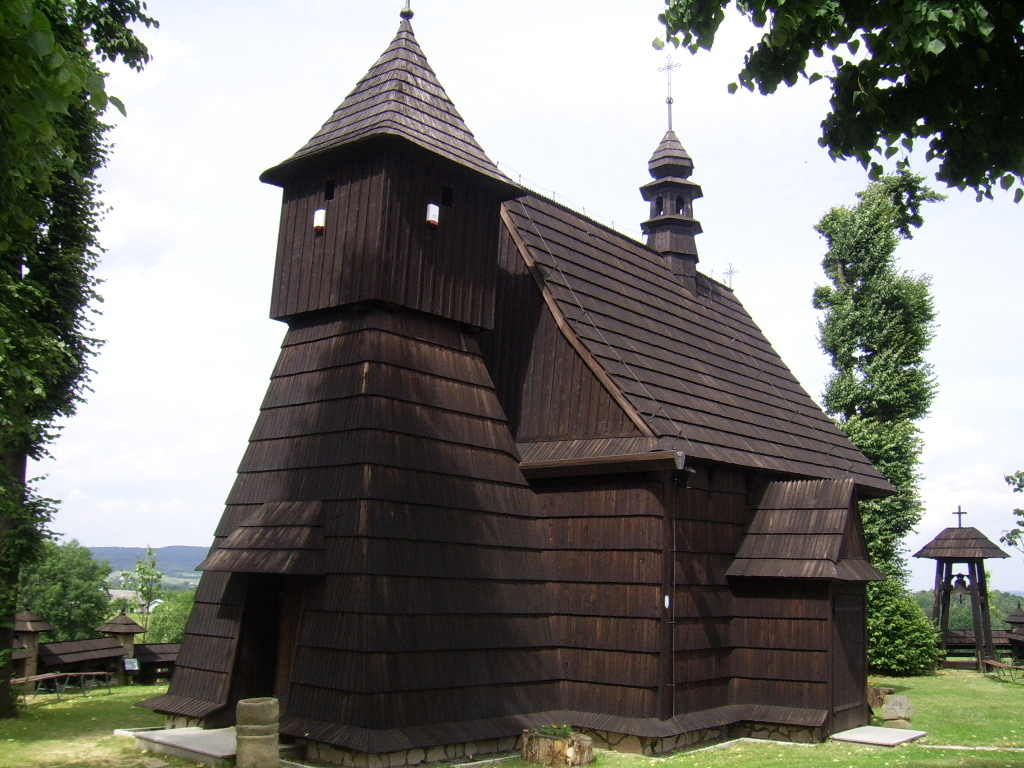
John the Baptist Church in Rzepiennik Biskupi from 16th century

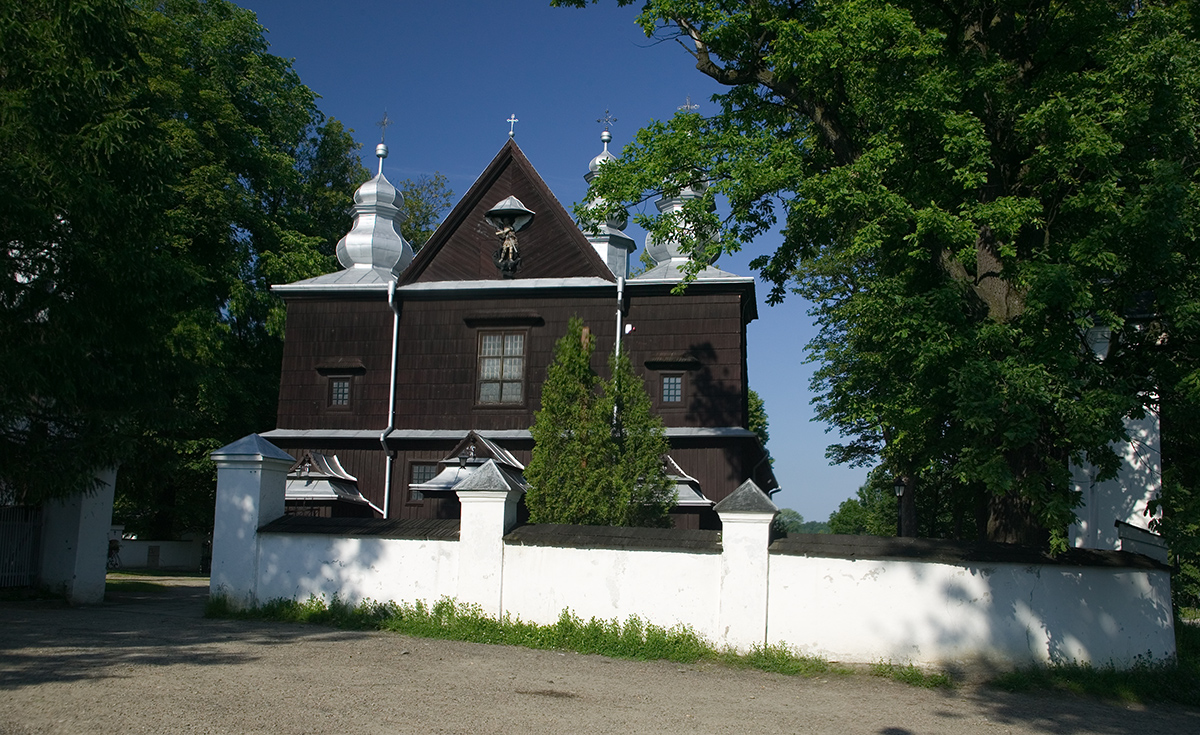
St. Michael the Archangel Church in Szalowa, from 18th century

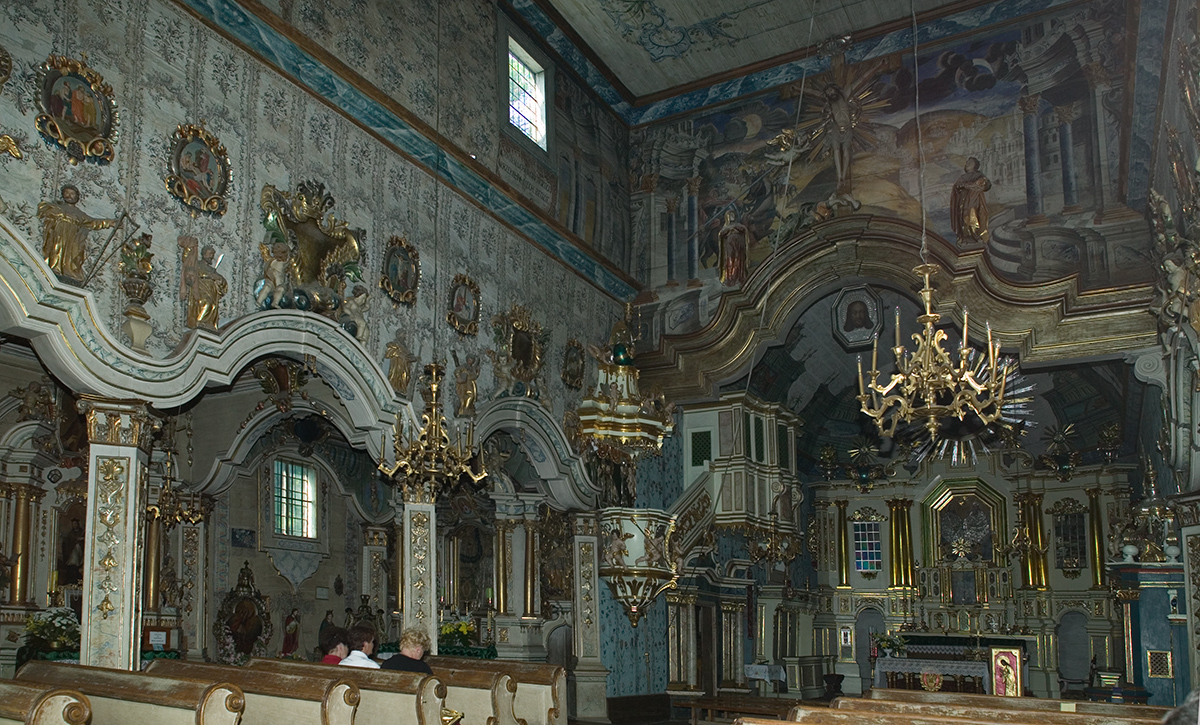
St. Michael in Szalowa, interior

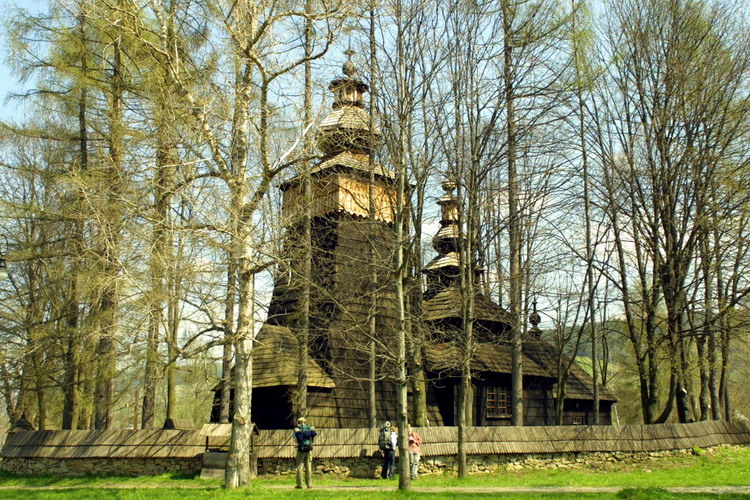
St. Jacob Church in Powroźnik from 1604

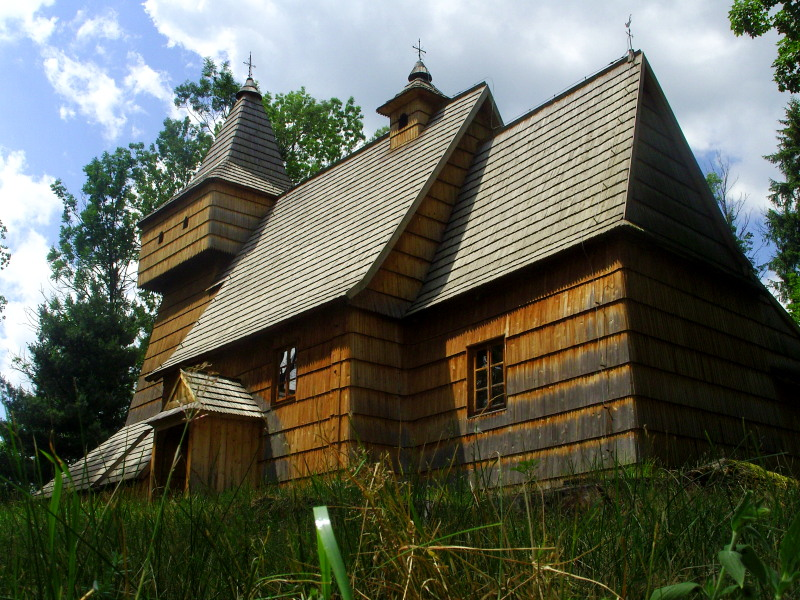
St. Martin church in Grywałd from 16th/17th century

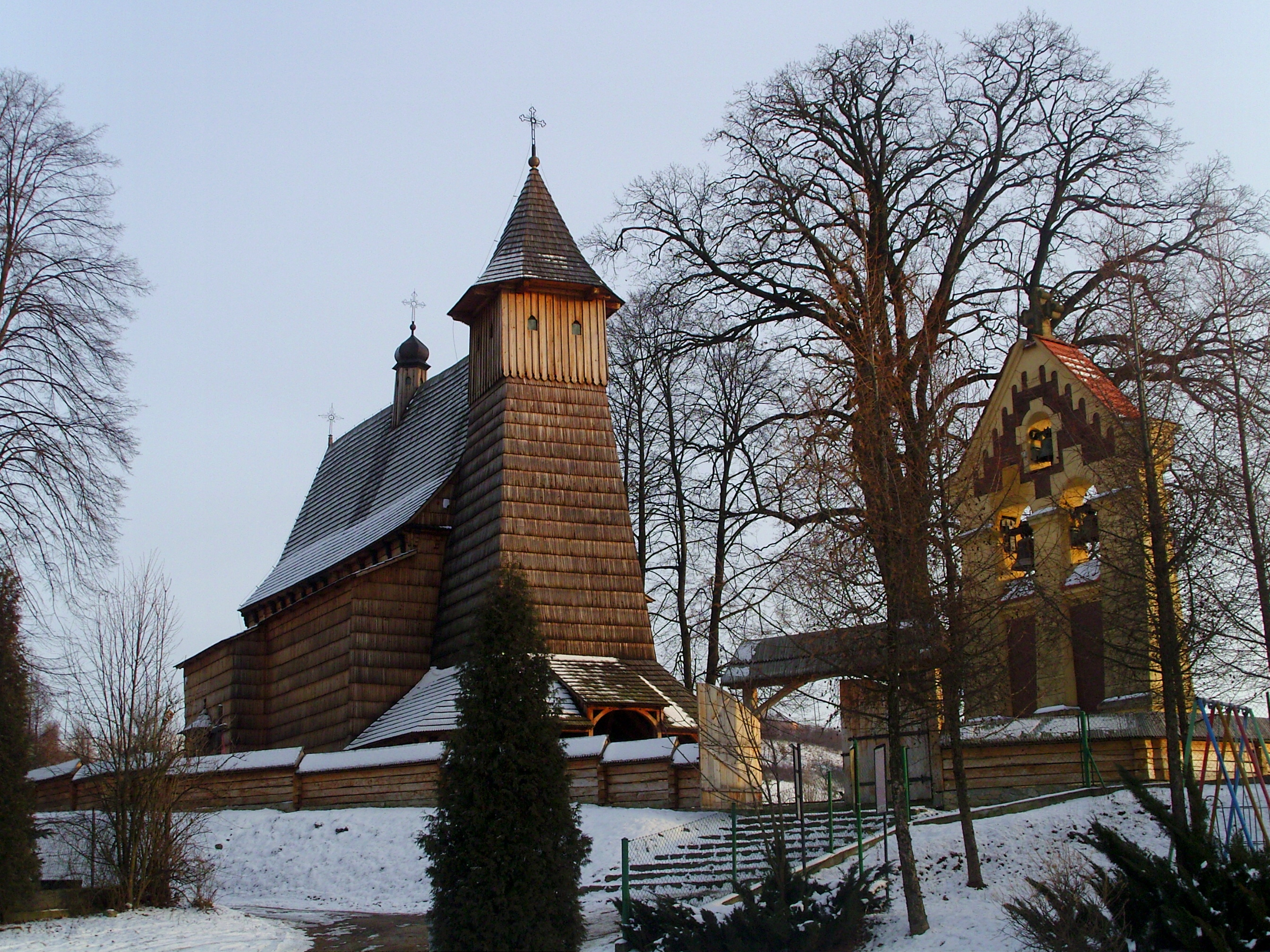
St. Dorothy Church in Trzcinica from end of 15th century

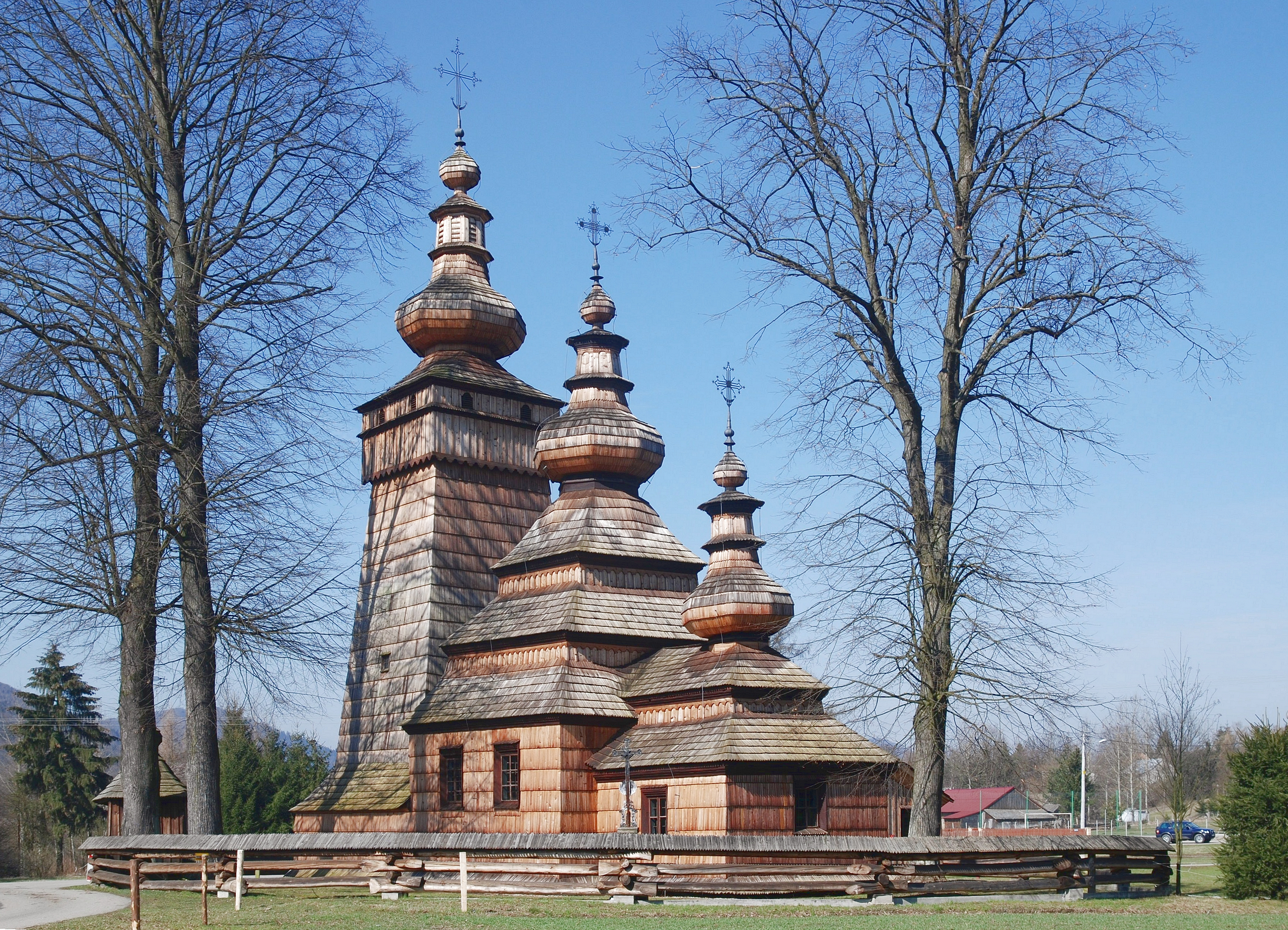
St Paraskeva Church in Kwiatoń from 17th century

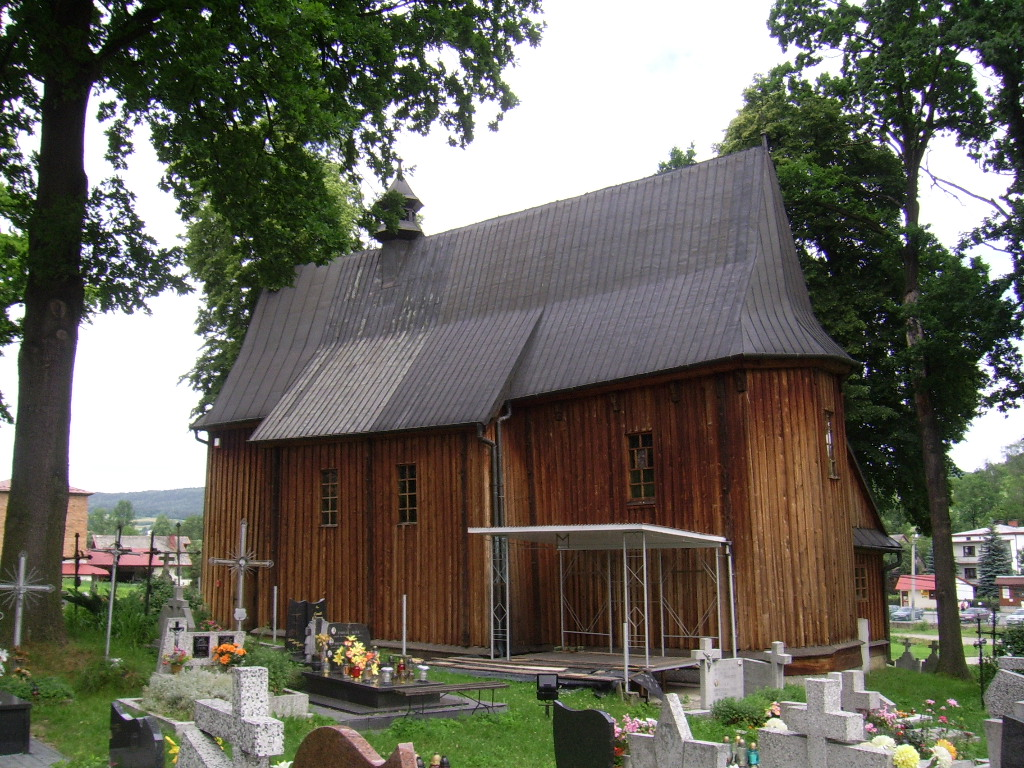
Nawiedzenia Church in Iwkowa from 15th-17th centuries

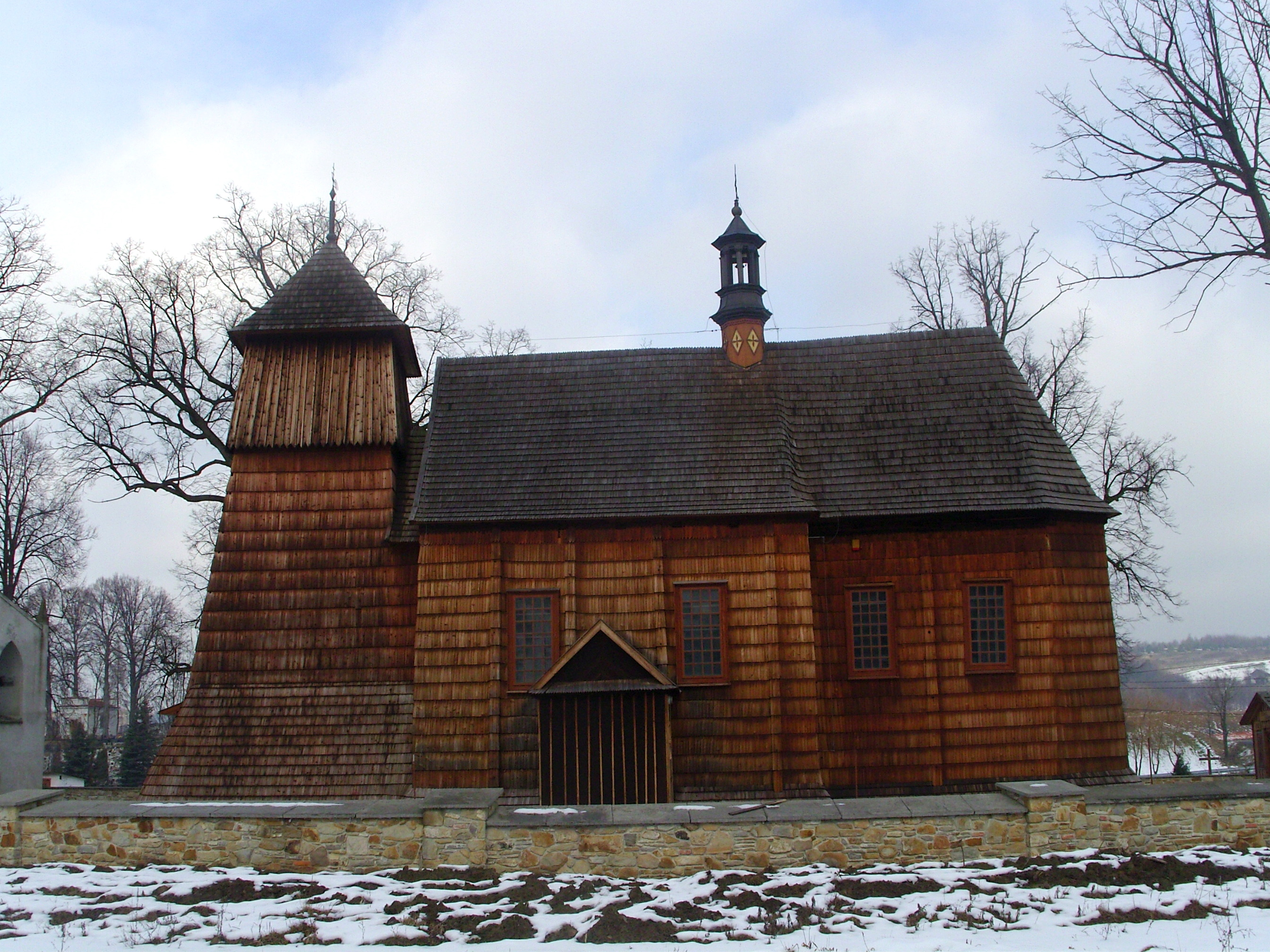
St. Catherine Church in Gogołów from 1672

== See also ==
- Carpathian wooden churches
- Vernacular architecture of the Carpathians
- Wooden synagogues of the former Polish-Lithuanian Commonwealth
- Zakopane Style architecture
- Lesser Poland
