= Dębno, Nowy Targ County =

Dębno
- Village
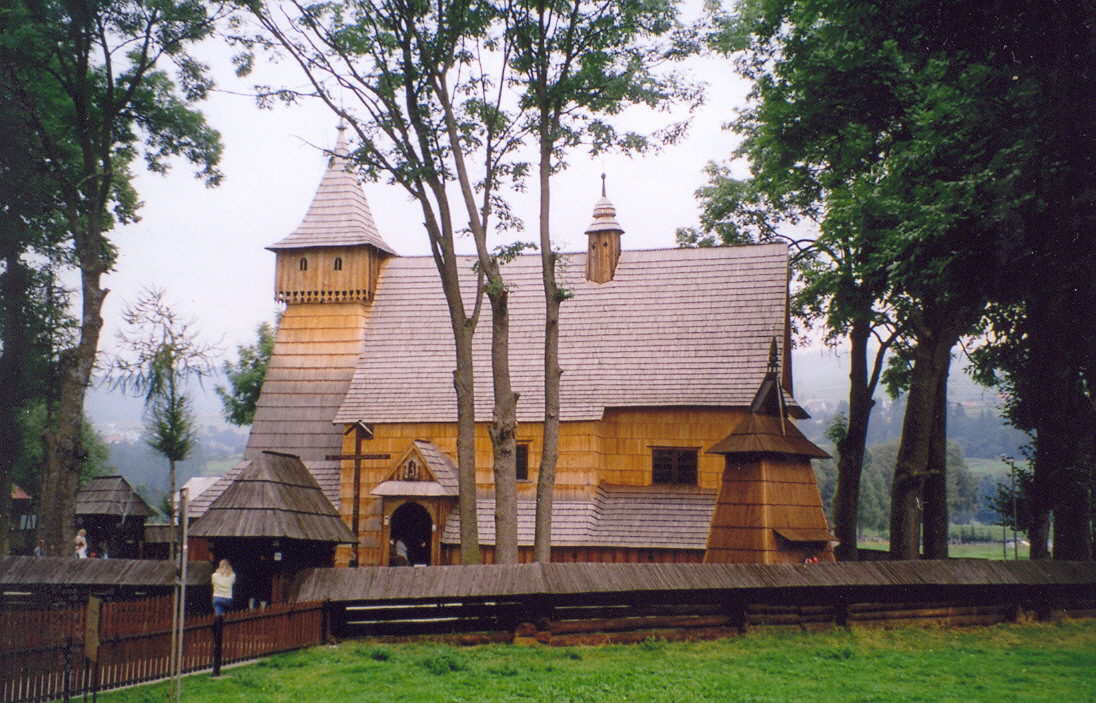
- St. Michael Archangel Church, 15th century

- Location within Poland
- Coordinates: 49°28′0″N 20°12′30″E
- Country: Poland
- Voivodeship: Lesser Poland
- County: Nowy Targ
- Gmina: Nowy Targ
- Population: 800

Dębno [ˈdɛmbnɔ] is a village in the administrative district of Gmina Nowy Targ, within Nowy Targ County, Lesser Poland Voivodeship, in southern Poland.

Its main tourist attraction is the St. Michael the Archangel Church from 15th century, part of the UNESCO monument, the Wooden churches of Southern Lesser Poland.

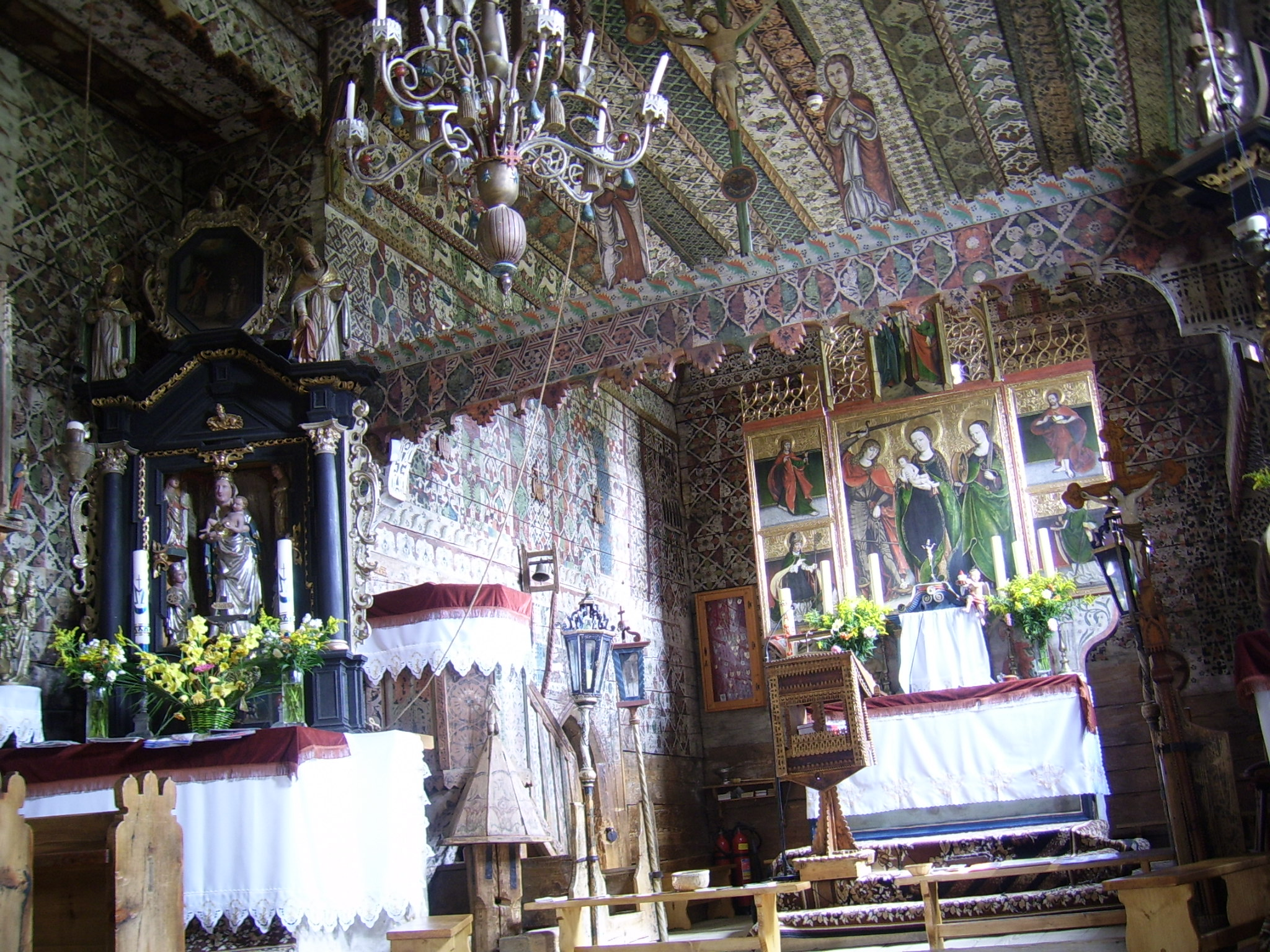
Lavishly decorated interior of St. Michael Archangel
