= Barycz, Brzozów County =

Barycz
- Village
- Location within Poland
- Coordinates: 49°48′44″N 22°2′26″E
- Country: Poland
- Voivodeship: Subcarpathian
- County: Brzozów
- Gmina: Domaradz
- Population: 1,110

Barycz [ˈbarɨt͡ʂ] is a village in the administrative district of Gmina Domaradz, in Brzozów County, Subcarpathian Voivodeship, in southeastern Poland.
