= Domaradz, Podkarpackie Voivodeship =

Domaradz
- Village
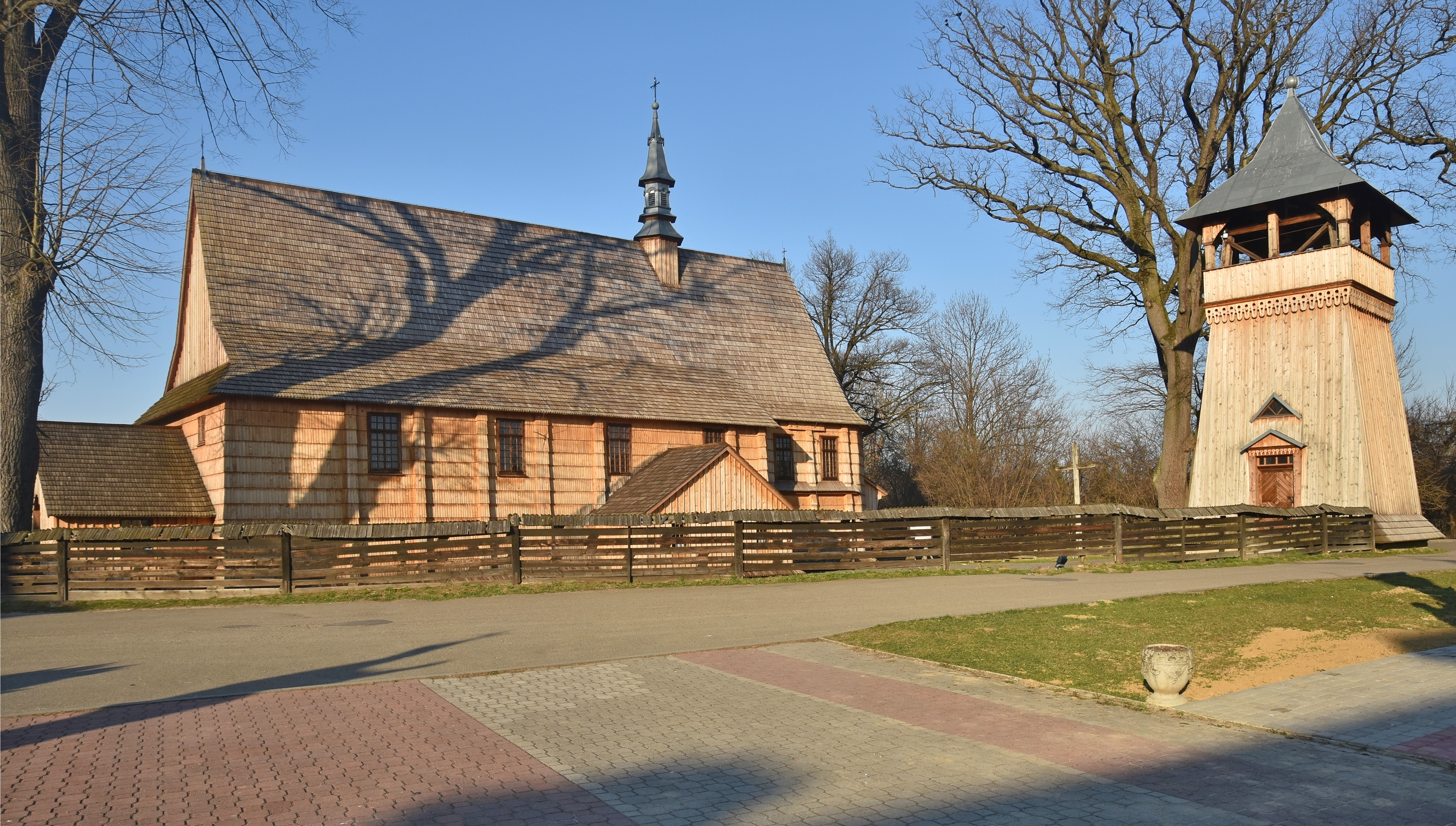
- One of the local churches, part of Poland's UNESCO World Heritage Sites

- Location within Poland
- Coordinates: 49°47′13″N 21°56′48″E
- Country: Poland
- Voivodeship: Subcarpathian
- County: Brzozów
- Gmina: Domaradz
- Population: 3,100
- Website: http://www.domaradz.pl

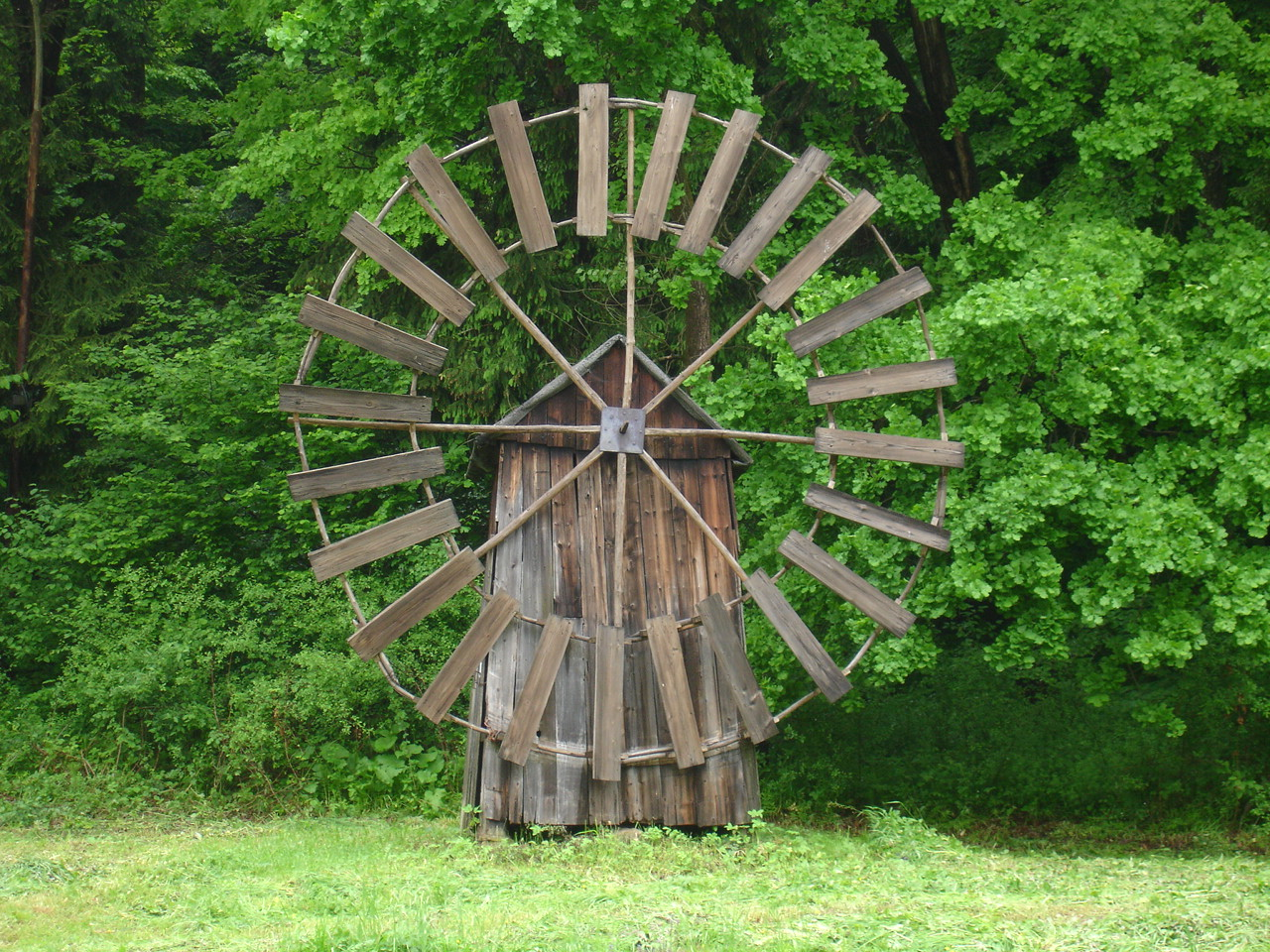
Windmill from Domaradz, moved to Sanok

Domaradz [dɔˈmarat͡s] is a village in Brzozów County, Subcarpathian Voivodeship, in south-eastern Poland. It is the seat of the gmina (administrative district) called Gmina Domaradz. One of the old churches from Domaradz is entered into UNESCO World Heritage Site.

== See also ==
- Walddeutsche
