= Golcowa =

- Village
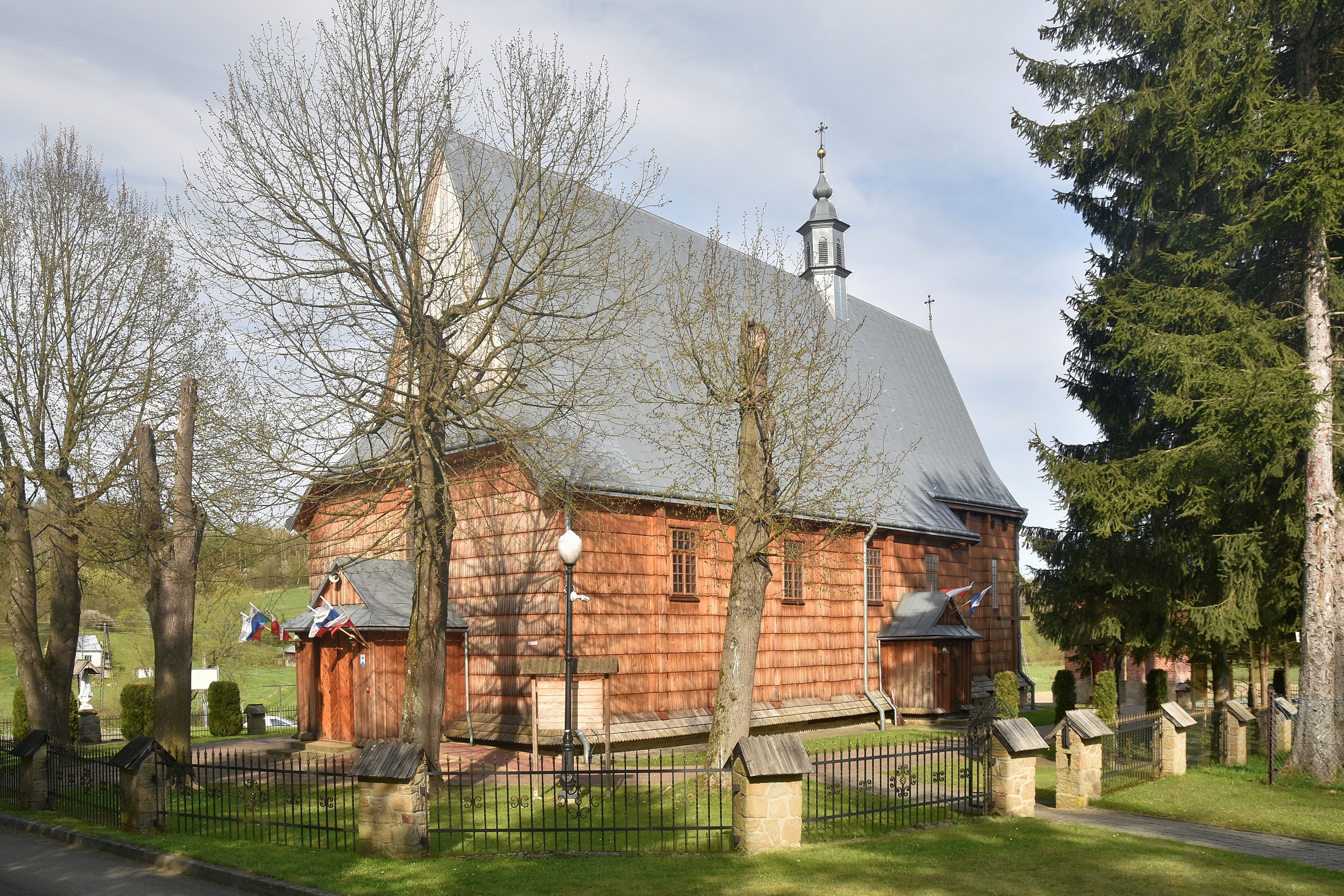
- Saint Barbara and Nativity of the Blessed Virgin Mary church in Golcowa

- Location within Poland
- Coordinates: 49°47′N 22°2′E
- Country: Poland
- Voivodeship: Subcarpathian
- County: Brzozów
- Gmina: Domaradz

Population
  - Total: 2,200
- Time zone: UTC+1 (CET)
  - Summer (DST): UTC+2 (CEST)
- Vehicle registration: RBR
- Website: http://www.golcowa.koon.pl

Golcowa [ɡɔlˈt͡sɔva] is a village in the administrative district of Gmina Domaradz, within Brzozów County, Subcarpathian Voivodeship, in south-eastern Poland.

In the village are two schools and two churches, larch in this historic parish church. St. Barbara was built probably in 1485. This monument is located on the Wooden Architecture list.

The village is covered with hills. There were oil deposits. There are hills reaching 478 meters above sea level. Beautiful views, forests, hills, unspoilt natural environment, scenic river Golcówka, these are the natural qualities of the village.

Four Polish citizens were murdered by Nazi Germany in the village during World War II.
