= Lipnica Murowana =

- Village
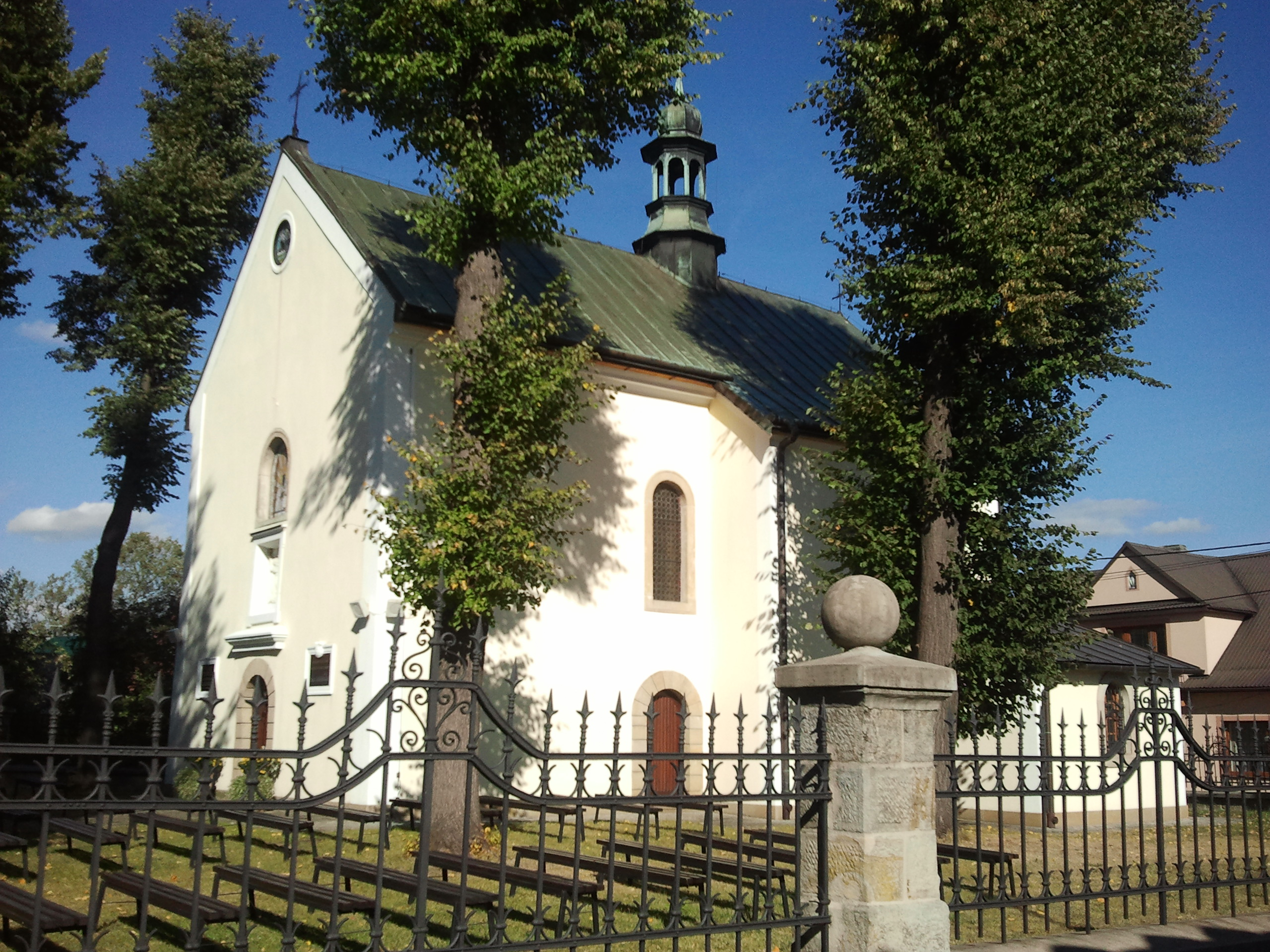
- Saint Simon Church

- Location within Poland
- Coordinates: 49°51′28″N 20°31′45″E
- Country: Poland
- Voivodeship: Lesser Poland
- County: Bochnia
- Gmina: Lipnica Murowana
- Population (2006): 890
- Time zone: UTC+1 (CET)
  - Summer (DST): UTC+2 (CEST)
- Postal code: 32-724
- Area code: +48 14
- Car plates: KBC
- Website: http://www.lipniczanin.pl

Lipnica Murowana [lipˈɲit͡sa murɔˈvana] is a village in southern Poland. It is the seat of the district called Gmina Lipnica Murowana, within Bochnia County.

The village is the site of Saint Leonard's church, built at the end of the 15th century. This is one of the six Wooden Churches of Southern Little Poland, on the UNESCO list of World Heritage Sites since 2003.

== Name ==
Lipnica was first mentioned in the 1320s, when its name was spelled Lypnycza. In a 1327 document, it was called Villa Conradi, while in 1342, its name was presented as civitatis Lipnik. In a court document from 1445, the town was called Lipnicza murata, while in 1588 King Sigismund III officially named it civitas Murata Lipnicensis. Since the 18th century, the Polish form of the name of the town is used as either Lipnica Murowana or just Lipnica.

== History ==
Lipnica Murowana is located along the Uszwica river valley, among the hills of the Island Beskids. First Slavic settlements here date back to the early Middle Ages, and according to parish documents from 1781, first Roman Catholic church was established here in 1141, but this has not been confirmed by any other sources.

It is not known when Lipnica or Lipnik, as it was called, was granted Magdeburg rights. Most likely this happened in 1319 or 1326, during the reign of Ladislaus the Short. By 1326, Lipnik had a schultheiss named Konrad, and a typical medieval grid plan, with a market square and town hall. At that time, the area of Lipnik was app. 2500 hectares. The town was protected by a rampart and a moat, and by the 15th century, it had a council, headed by a vogt. Lipnica was allowed to have two fairs a year, but in 1684 King John III Sobieski gave permission for two more fairs. The town prospered due to its location along a busy merchant route from Kraków to Hungary. In the 16th century, it was the 19th largest town of the province of Lesser Poland, despite having burned in a 1520 fire.

The period of prosperity for Lipnica ended in the 1650s, when, during the catastrophic Swedish invasion of Poland (known as the "Deluge"), the town was captured and burned to the ground by Swedes and Transilvanians. Lipnica has never recovered from the destruction, and gradually lost its importance. Following the first partition of Poland (1772), Lipnica was annexed by the Habsburg Empire, and remained in Austrian Galicia until 1918. During Austrian rule, Lipnica further declined, and its residents lived in widespread poverty.

In early months of World War I, the area of Lipnica witnessed heavy fighting between Russian and Austro-Hungarian troops (see Battle of Galicia). The town was destroyed, and after the frontline had moved eastwards, local residents starved. In 1918, Lipnica became part of Krakow Voivodeship, Second Polish Republic. On July 1, 1934, it lost its town charter, and the mayor was replaced by the voigt.
