= St. Michael Archangel's Church, Binarowa =

Coordinates: 49.7573°N 21.2274°E

St. Michael Archangel's Church in Binarowa
- Kościół św. Michała Archanioła w Binarowej
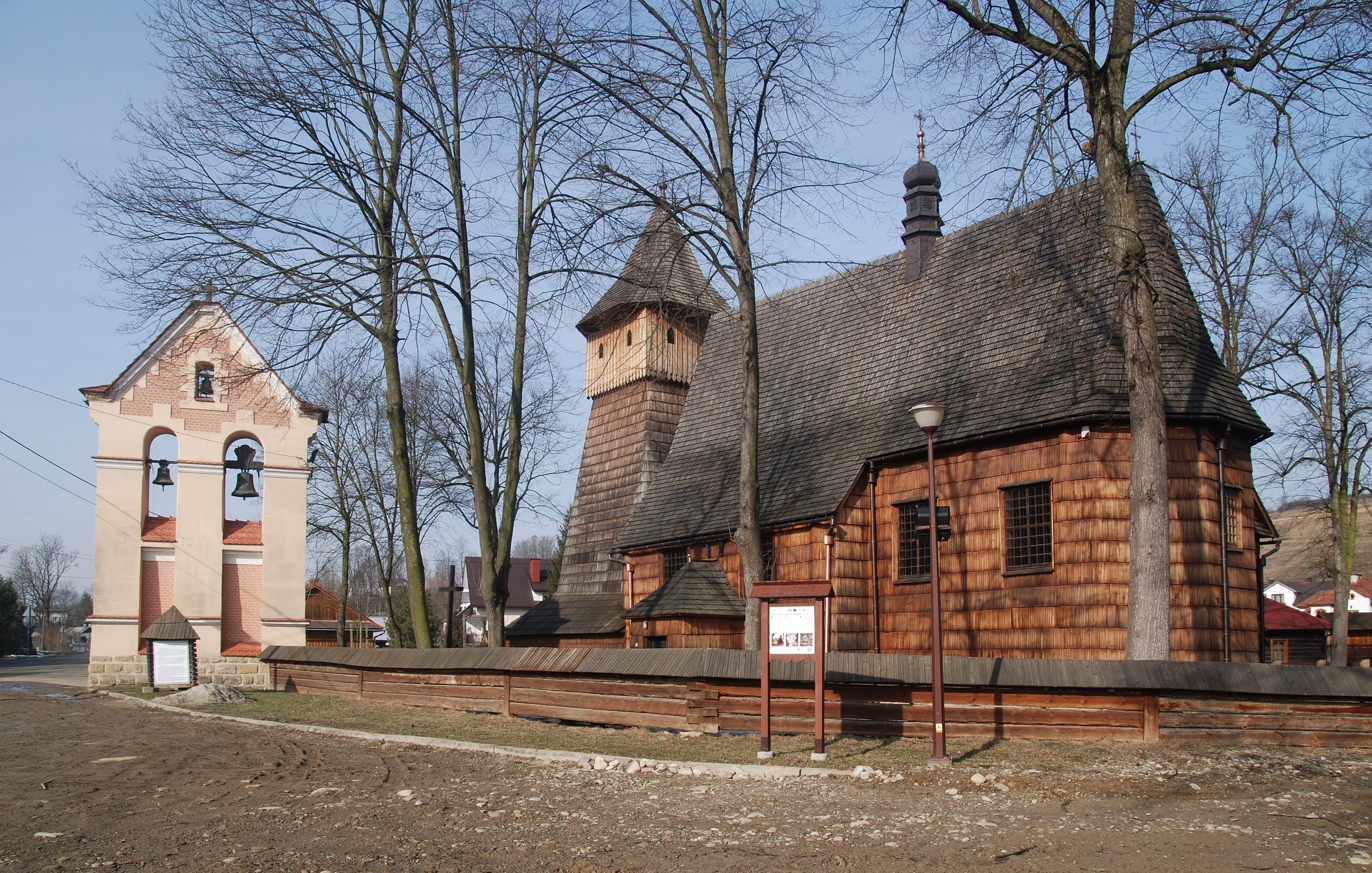
- St. Michael Archangel's Church in Binarowa
- Address: Binarowa
- Country: Poland
- Denomination: Roman Catholic Church

History
- Status: active church

Architecture
- Style: Gothic
- Years built: c. 1500

UNESCO World Heritage Site
- Part of: Wooden Churches of Southern Małopolska
- Criteria: Cultural: (iii), (iv)
- Reference: 1053-001
- Inscription: 2003 (27th Session)

St. Michael Archangel's Church is a Roman Catholic Gothic-wooden church located in the village of Binarowa, southeast Poland, dating from the 15th or early 16th century. Together with different churches is designated as part of the UNESCO Wooden Churches of Southern Lesser Poland.

== History ==
A document from 1415 informs of the existence of a wooden parish church in Binarowa, which is acknowledge by Jan Długosz on the turning point of the third and fourth quarter of the fifteenth century. The present church was built around 1500. The date of the church's consecration remains unknown. In the next centuries a number of renovation works took place, to keep the church in its best state:

- In 1596, a nave tower was built.
- In the first half of the sixteenth-century, the church's interior was almost entirely decorated in a polychrome.
- Between 1602 and 1608, the church had been built a bell tower.
- Between 1641 and 1650 the church had undergone an extensive reconstruction, with a painting of the Guardian Angels added to the nave, the tower received a new topping, the matroneum was reconstructed, the window openings were enlarged, and a new polychrome was done to decorate the walls.
- In 1844, an extensive renovation of the church included the removal and the soboty (wooden undercut supported by pillars), which were constructed before 1601, the furnishings were replaced.
- Between 1890 and 1908, the church's weak structure was secured (the wood shingle was replaced with tin), the wood shingle walls were replaced with planks, and columns were placed in the naive.
- Between 1953 and 1956, the church was renovated.
- In the 1990s, the church was restored to its original structure, with the roof tin replaced with wood shingle.
- Between 2010 and 2012, the church was renovated, restoring the church after damage made in the 2010 flood.
