= Blizne =

- Village
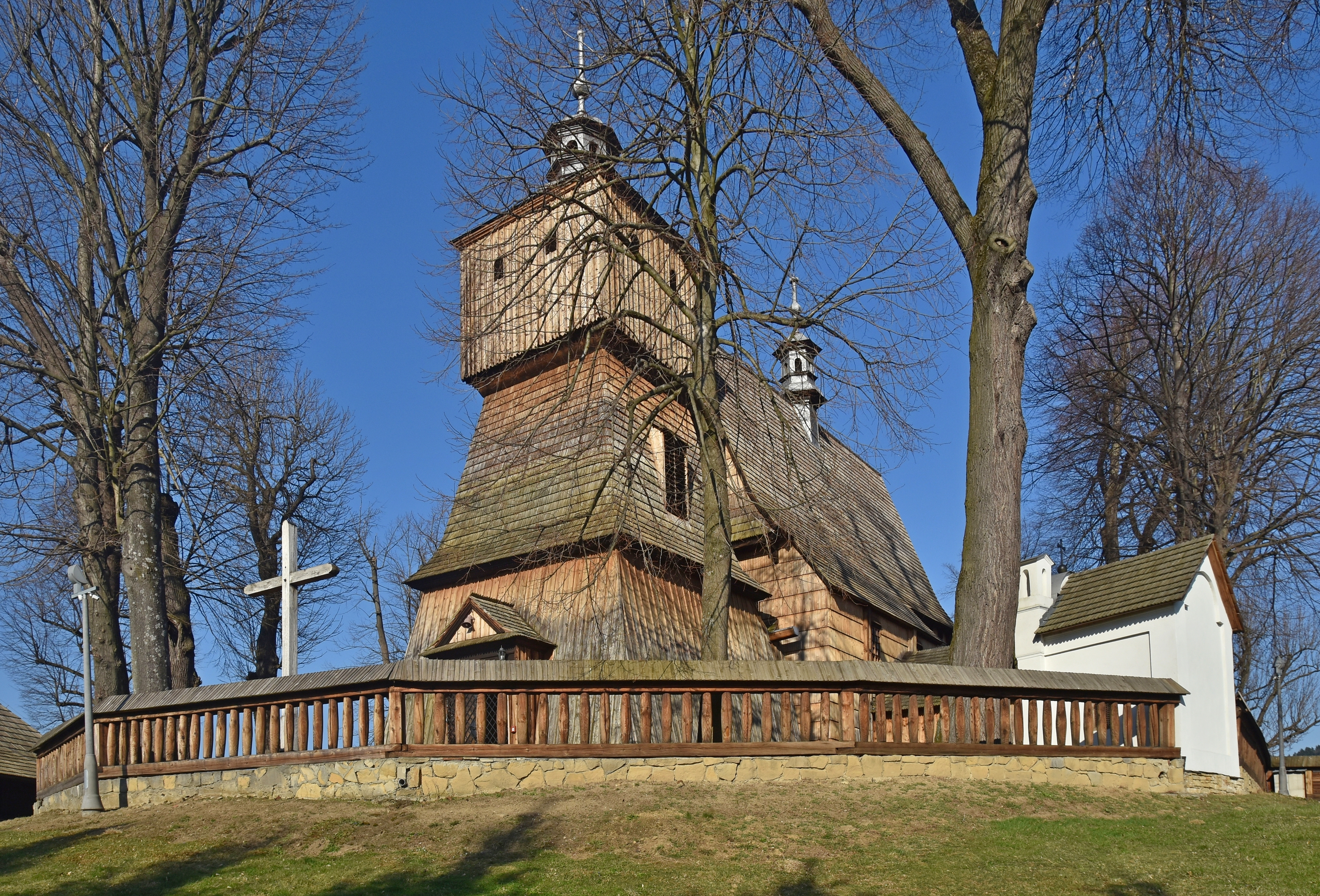
- Church of All Saints

- Location within Poland
- Coordinates: 49°45′4″N 21°58′29″E
- Country: Poland
- Voivodeship: Subcarpathian
- County: Brzozów
- Gmina: Jasienica Rosielna

Population
  - Total: 2,800

Blizne [ˈblʲiznɛ] is a village in the administrative district of Gmina Jasienica Rosielna, within Brzozów County, Subcarpathian Voivodeship, in south-eastern Poland.

The village is the site of All Saints Church, built in the 15th or 16th century. This is one of the six Wooden Churches of Southern Lesser Poland, on the UNESCO list of World Heritage Sites since 2003.
