= Binarowa =

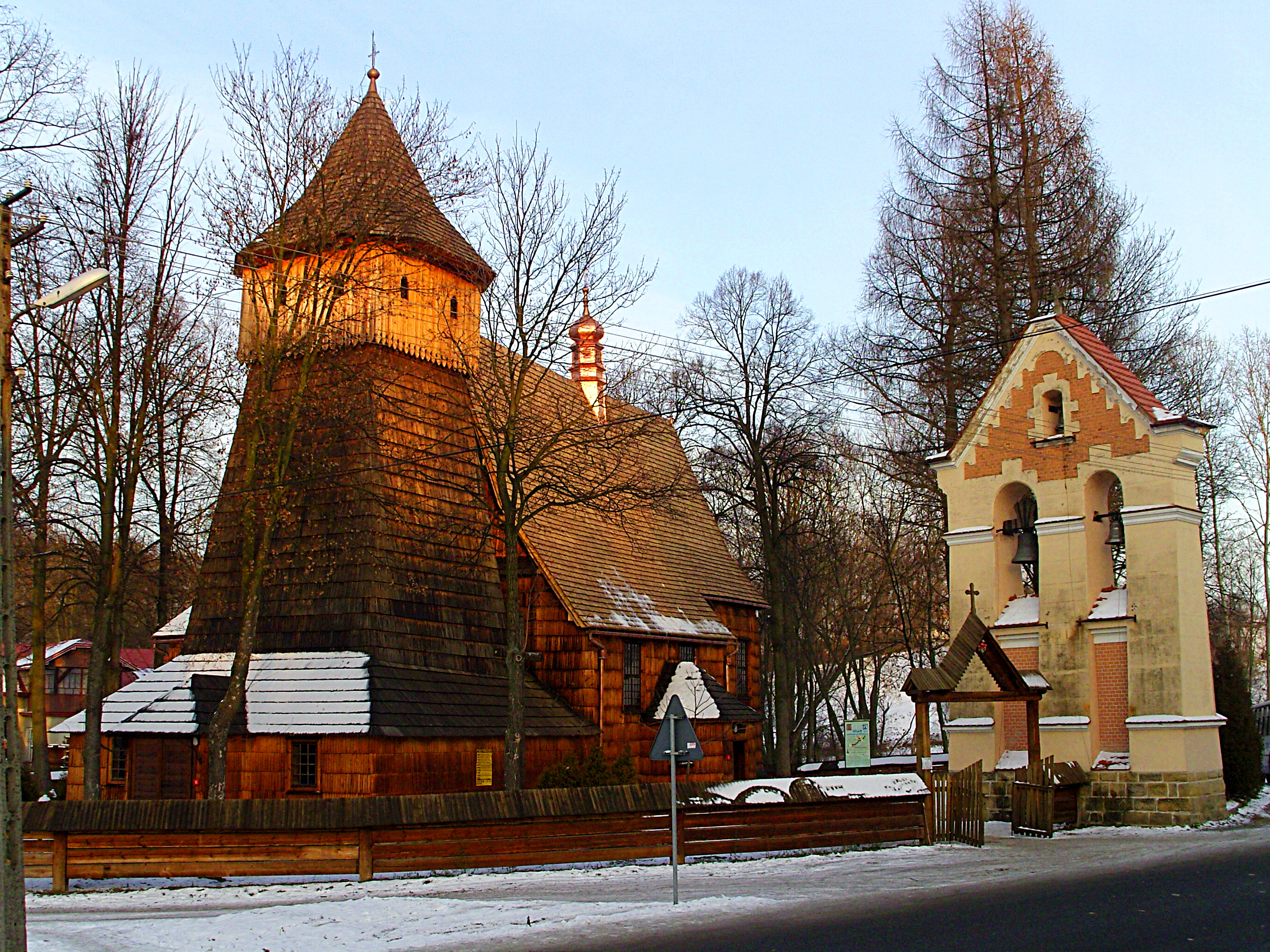
- St. Michael Archangel Church

- Location within Poland
- Coordinates: 49°45′15″N 21°13′45″E
- Country: Poland
- Voivodeship: Lesser Poland
- County: Gorlice
- Gmina: Biecz

Population (2006)
  - Total: 1,740
- Time zone: UTC+1 (CET)
  - Summer (DST): UTC+2 (CEST)
- Postal code: 38-340
- Area code: +48 13
- Car plates: KGR

Binarowa [binaˈrɔva] is a village in southern Poland which was established by Casimir III the Great in 1348.

The village is the site of St. Michael's Archangel Catholic Church, built in the 15th century. This is one of the six Wooden Churches of Southern Little Poland, on the UNESCO list of World Heritage Sites since 2003.

== Gallery ==
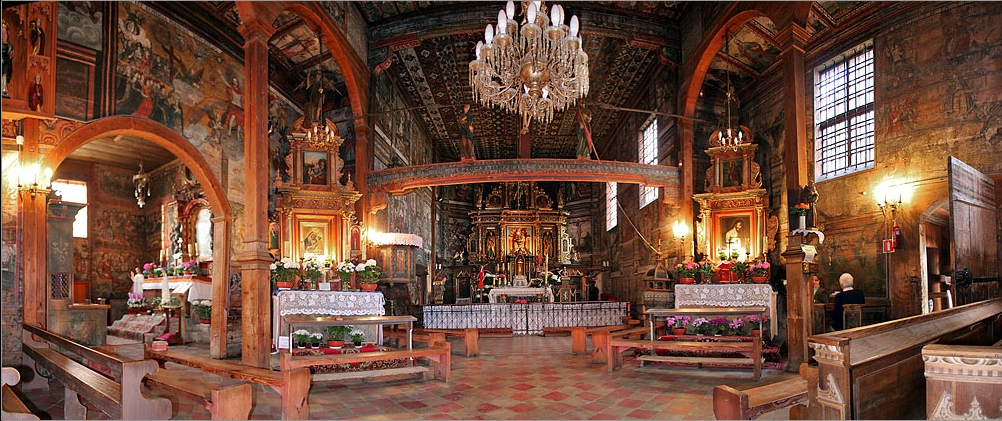

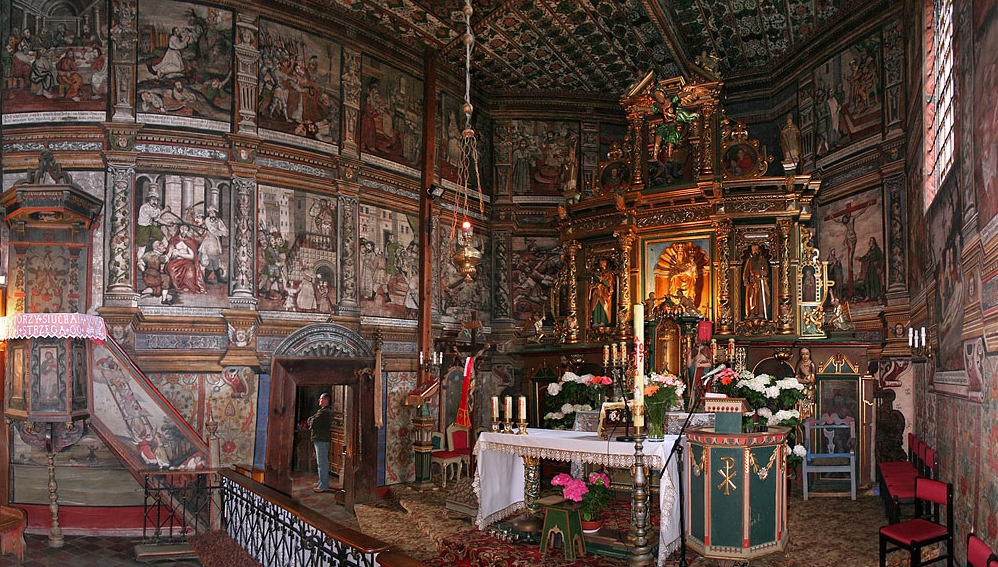

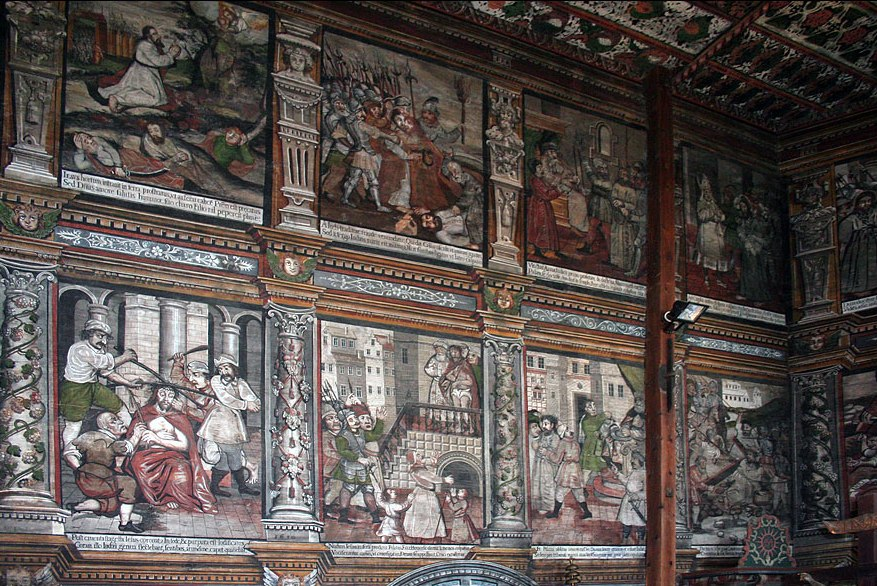
