= Pomeranian Voivodeship =

Province in northern Poland

Pomeranian Voivodeship Województwo pomorskie
- Voivodeship
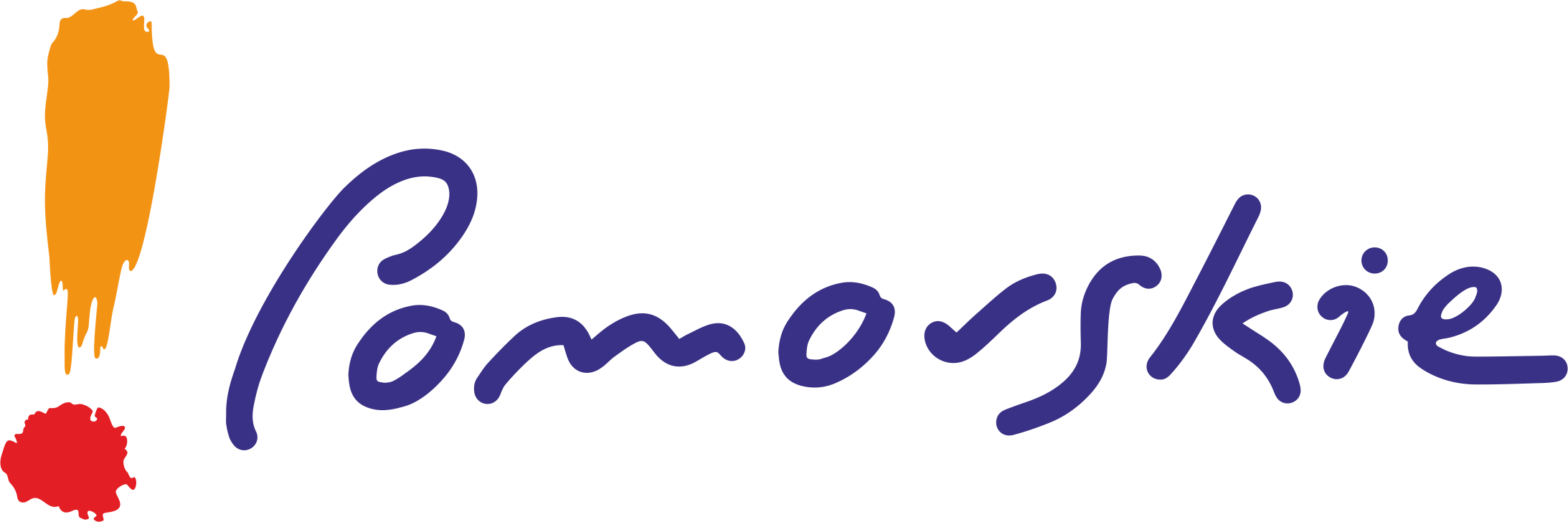
- Flag Coat of arms Brandmark

- Location within Poland
- Coordinates: 54°12′N 18°01′E
- Country: Poland
- Capital: Gdańsk
- Counties: 16, including 4 city counties: Gdańsk; Gdynia; Słupsk; Sopot; Bytów County; Chojnice County; Człuchów County; Gdańsk County; Kartuzy County; Kościerzyna County; Kwidzyn County; Lębork County; Malbork County; Nowy Dwór County; Puck County; Słupsk County; Starogard County; Sztum County; Tczew County; Wejherowo County

Government
  - Body: Pomeranian Voivodeship executive board
  - Voivode: Beata Rutkiewicz (KO)
  - Marshal: Mieczysław Struk (KO)
  - EP: Pomeranian

Area
  - Total: 18,293 km^{2} (7,063 sq mi)

Population (2019)
  - Total: 2,337,769
  - Density: 127.80/km^{2} (330.99/sq mi)
  - Urban: 1,486,267
  - Rural: 851,502

GDP
  - Total: €50.993 billion (2024)
  - Per capita: €22,200 (2024)
- ISO 3166 code: PL-22
- Vehicle registration: G
- HDI (2022): 0.896 very high · 2nd
- Website: pomorskie.eu
- Further divided into 123 gminas

Pomeranian Voivodeship (Polish: województwo pomorskie [vɔjɛˈvut͡stfɔ pɔˈmɔrskʲɛ]; Kashubian: Pòmòrsczé wòjewództwò [pwɛˈmwɛrst͡ʃe wɛjɛˈwot͡stfwɛ]) is a voivodeship, a first-level administrative subdivision, in northwestern Poland. Its capital is Gdańsk.

The voivodeship was established on January 1, 1999, out of the former voivodeships of Gdańsk, Elbląg, and Słupsk, pursuant to the Polish local government reforms adopted in 1997. It is bordered by the West Pomeranian Voivodeship to the west, Greater Poland and the Kuyavian-Pomeranian Voivodeship to the south, the Warmian-Masurian Voivodeship to the east, and the Baltic Sea to the north. It also shares a short land border with Russia (Kaliningrad Oblast) on the Vistula Spit. The bulk of the voivodeship is located in the historic region of Pomerania, with the territories on the eastern bank of the Vistula being part of Powiśle. The Pomeranian part of the region comprises most of Pomerelia (the easternmost part of Pomerania) with its subregions of Kashubia and Kociewie, whereas the western part, around Słupsk, is part of Farther Pomerania.

The province is one of rich cultural heritage. The Tricity urban area, consisting of Gdańsk, Gdynia, and Sopot, is one of the main cultural, commercial, and educational centres of Poland. Gdańsk and Gdynia are two of the major Polish seaports, the first erected by Mieszko I of Poland in the Middle Ages, the latter built in the interwar period. Amongst the most recognisable landmarks of the region are the historic city centre of Gdańsk filled with Gothic, Renaissance and Baroque masterpieces, the Museum of the National Anthem in Będomin, located at the birthplace of Józef Wybicki, poet and politician, author of the national anthem of Poland, the largest medieval churches of Poland (the St. Mary's Church in Gdańsk and the Cathedral Basilica of the Assumption in Pelplin) and the Malbork Castle. The voivodeship also includes the narrow Hel Peninsula and the Polish half of the Vistula Spit. Other tourist destinations include Wejherowo, Sopot, Jurata, Łeba, Władysławowo, Puck, Krynica Morska, Ustka, Jastarnia, Kuźnica, Bytów and many fishing ports, lighthouses, and marinas.

== Etymology ==
The name Pomerania derives from the Slavic po more, meaning "by the sea" or "on the sea".

== Cities and towns ==
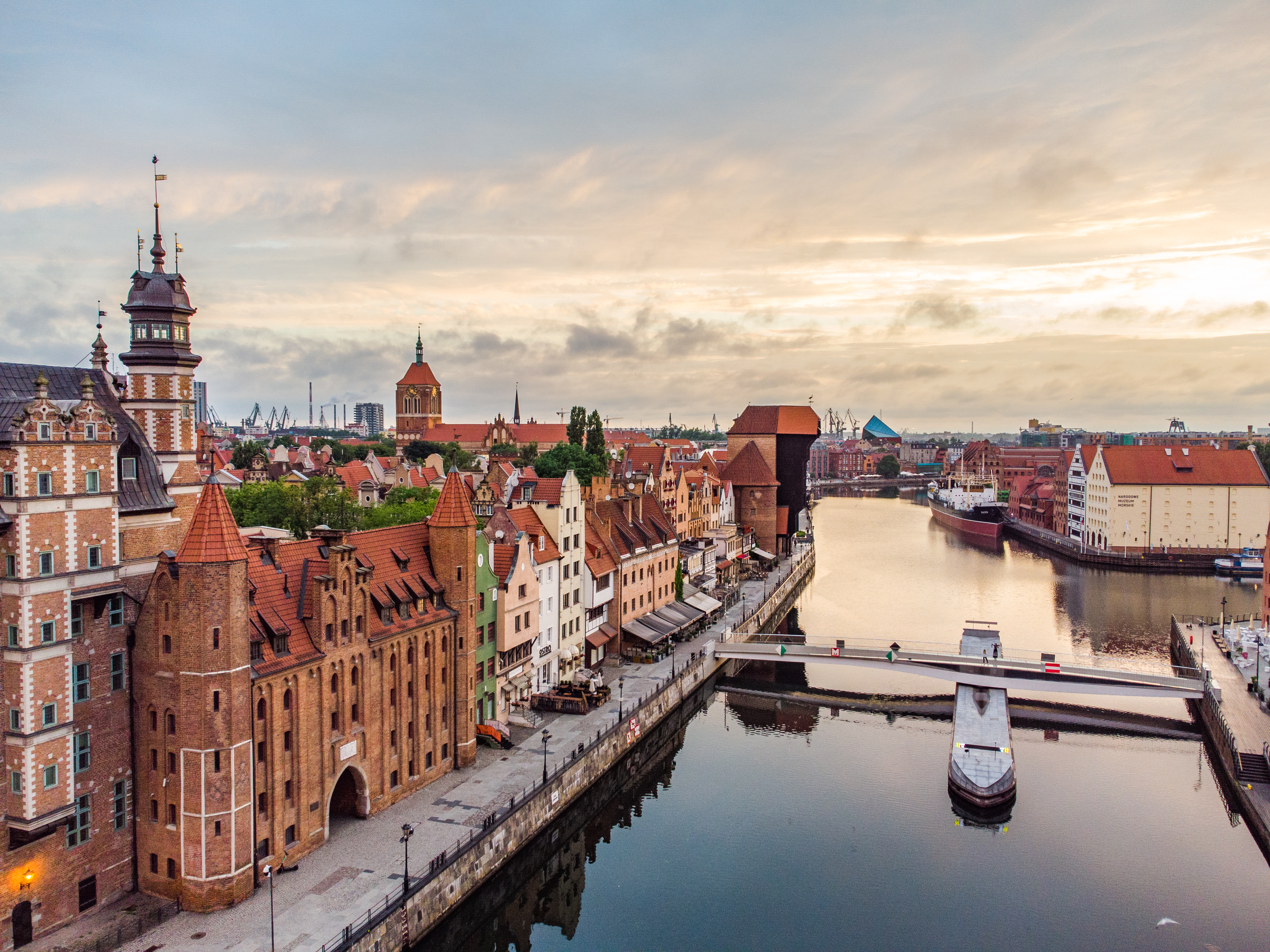
Gdańsk, principal seaport of Poland since the Middle Ages and the capital of Pomeranian Voivodeship

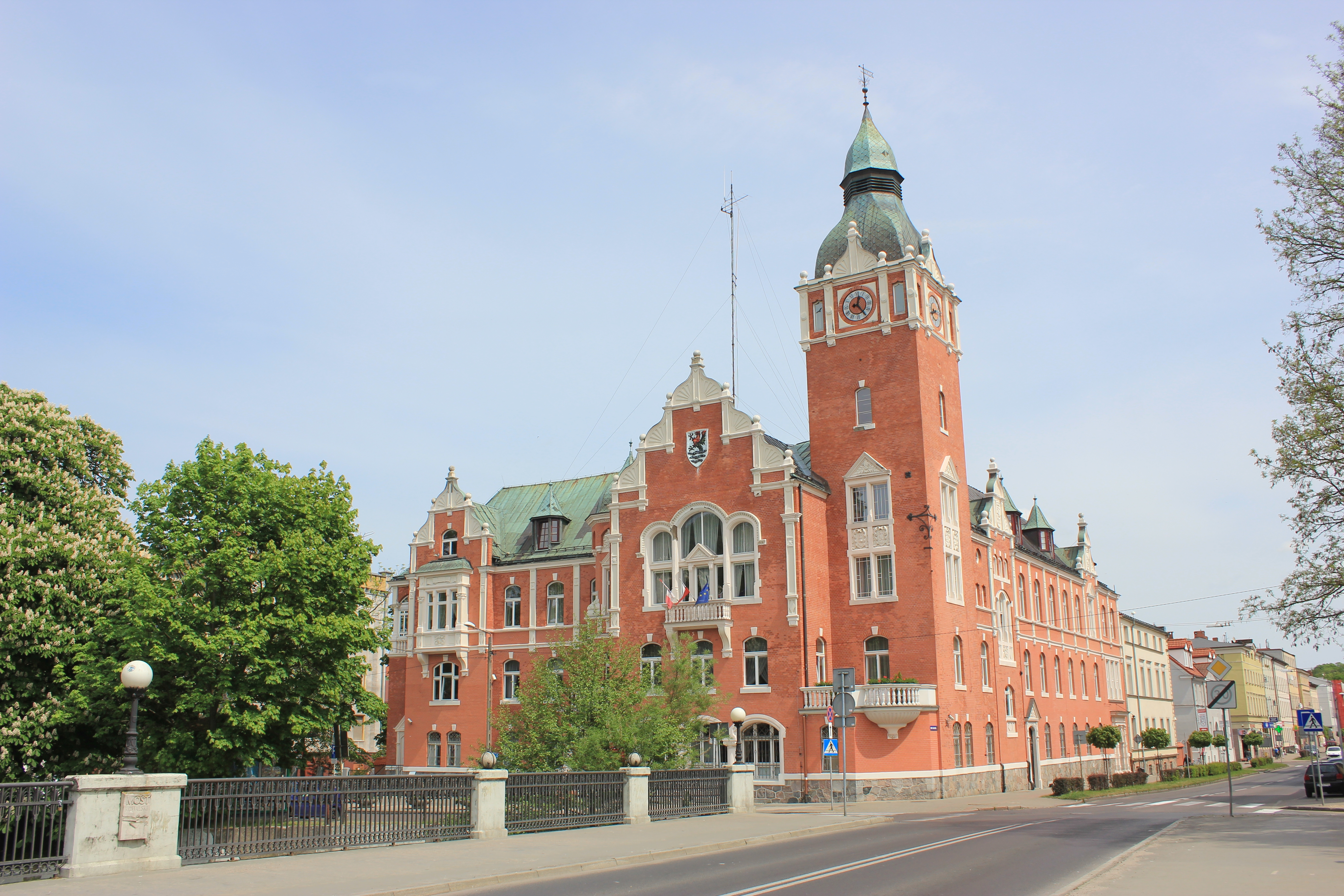
Słupsk, the largest city in the west of the voivodeship

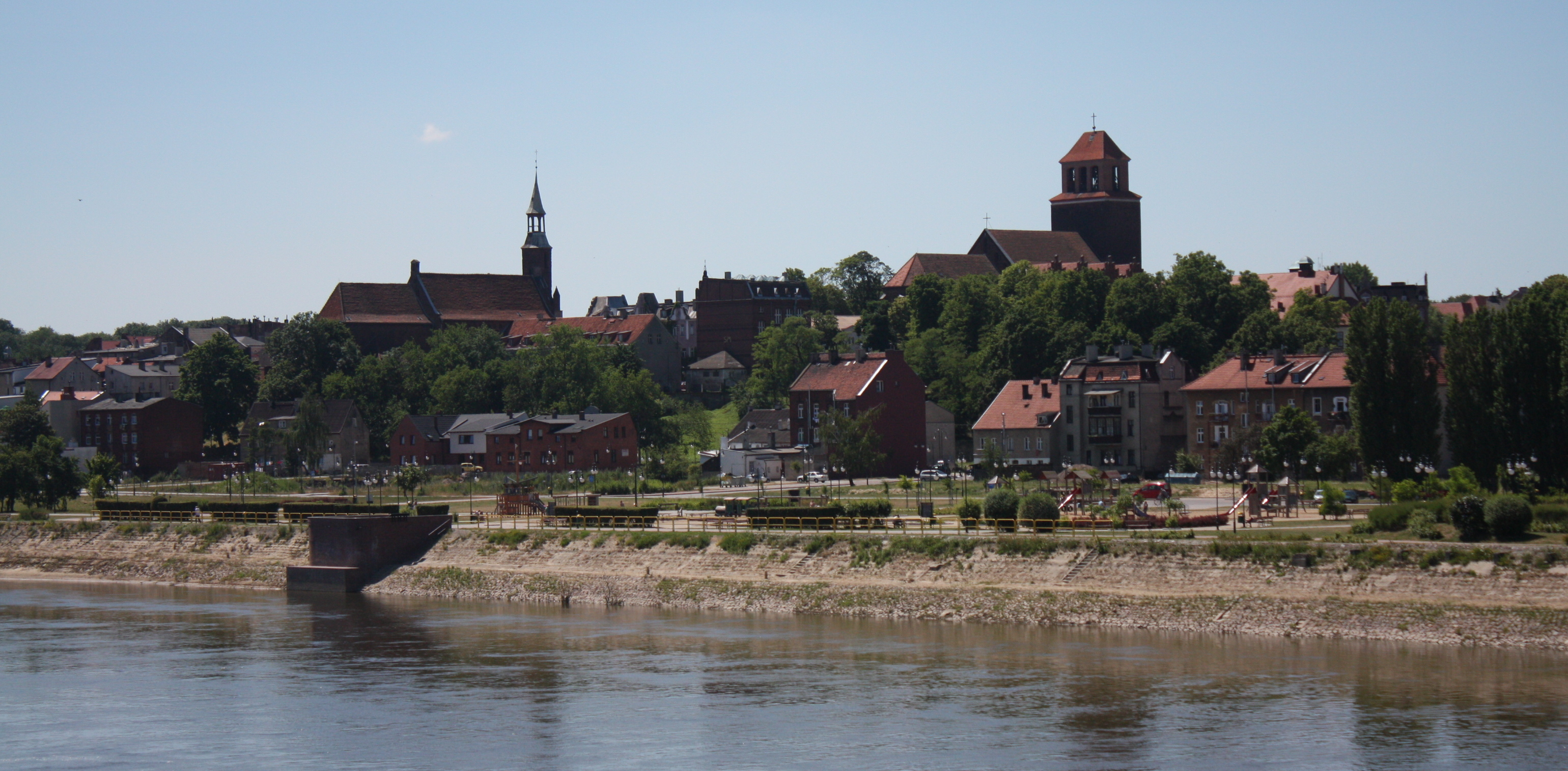
Tczew, the largest city in the ethnocultural region of Kociewie

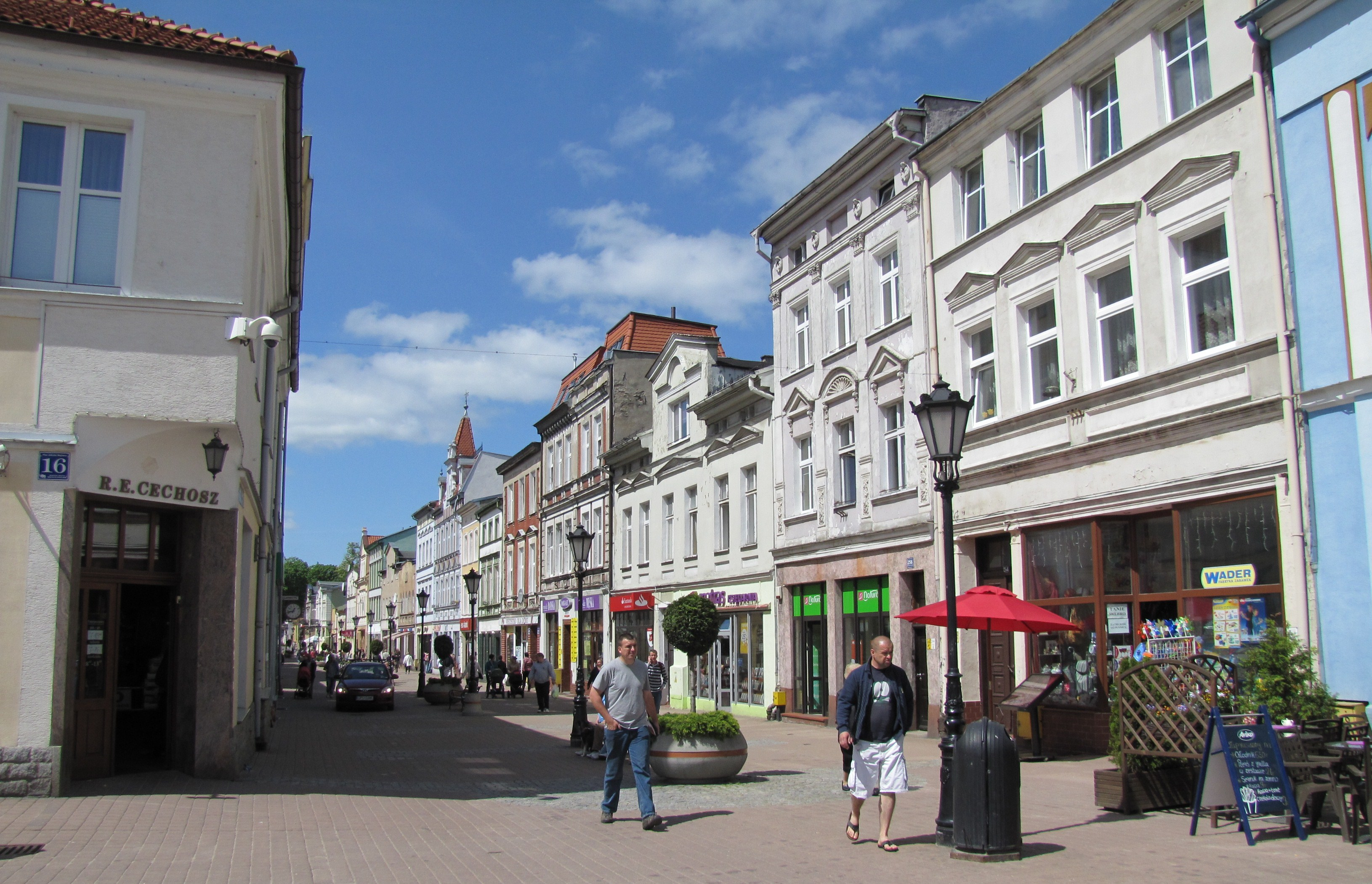
Wejherowo, one of the main centres of the ethnocultural region of Kashubia

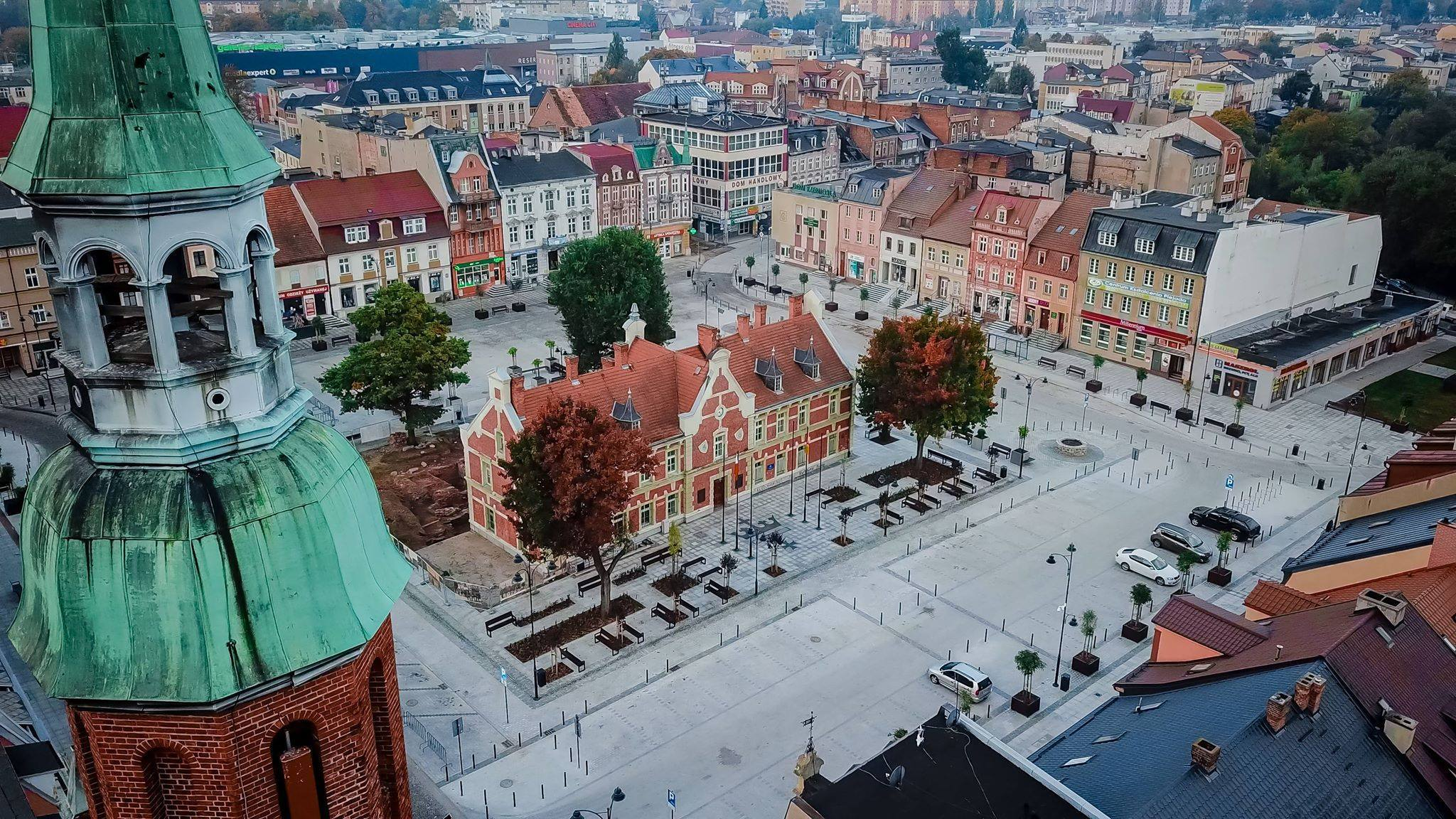
Starogard Gdański, the capital of Kociewie

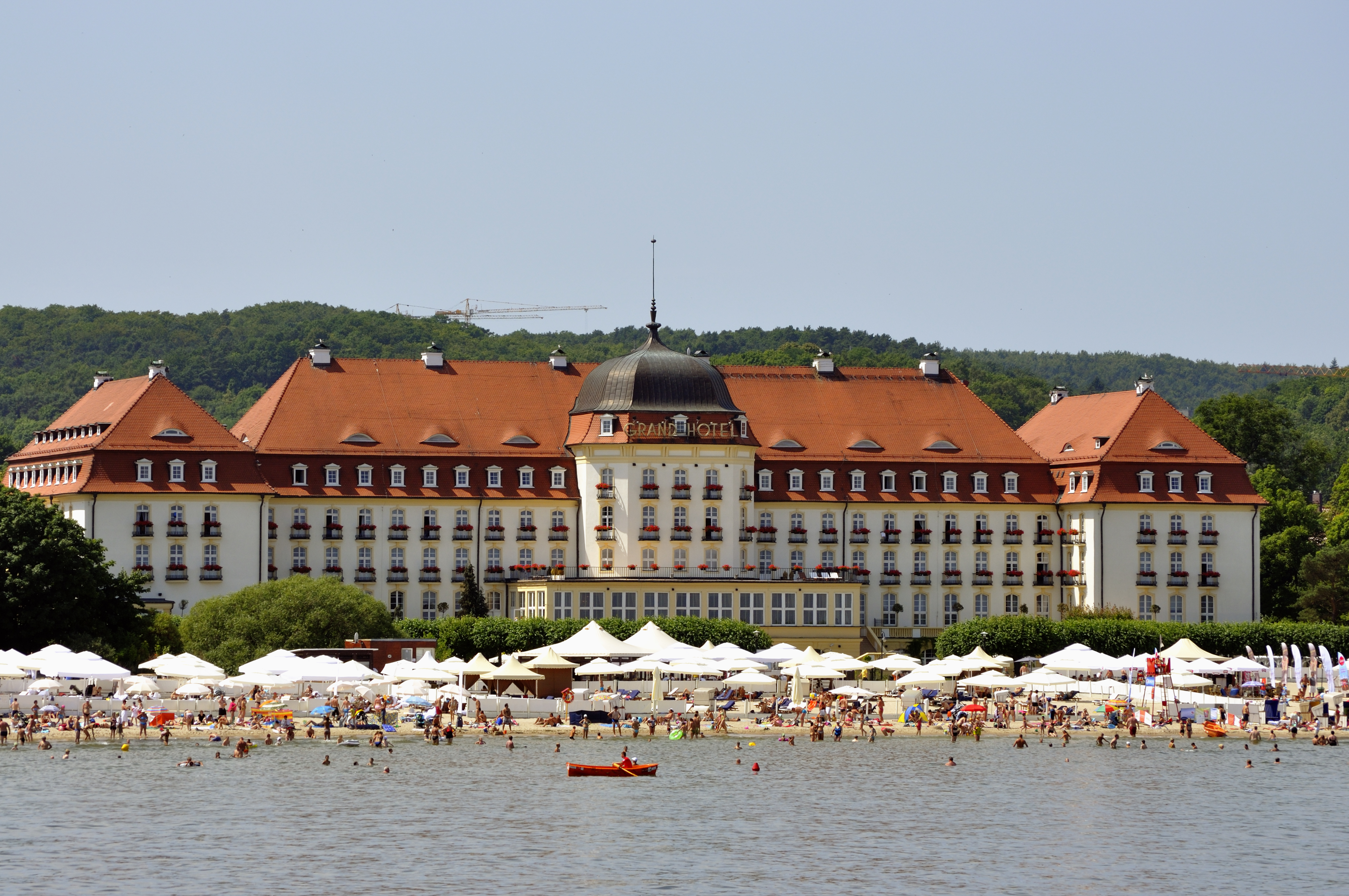
Sopot, a resort and one of the three cities of the Tricity

Historical population
Year	Pop.	±%
1988	2,095,147	—
2002	2,179,900	+4.0%
2011	2,276,174	+4.4%
2021	2,357,320	+3.6%

The voivodeship contains 7 cities and 35 towns. These are listed below in descending order of population (official 2019 figures).

Cities (governed by a city mayor or prezydent miasta):
1. Gdańsk (468,158)
2. Gdynia (246,244)
3. Słupsk (90,769)
4. Tczew (60,120)
5. Wejherowo (49,652)
6. Starogard Gdański (47,775)
7. Sopot (35,827)

Towns:

1. Rumia (49,160)
2. Chojnice (39,890)
3. Malbork (38,465)
4. Kwidzyn (38,444)
5. Lębork (35,333)
6. Pruszcz Gdański (31,135)
7. Reda (26,011)
8. Kościerzyna (23,776)
9. Bytów (16,918)
10. Ustka (15,460)
11. Kartuzy (14,536)
12. Człuchów (13,649)
13. Puck (11,213)
14. Miastko (10,439)
15. Sztum (9,940)
16. Władysławowo (9,930)
17. Czersk (9,910)
18. Nowy Dwór Gdański (9,905)
19. Prabuty (8,695)
20. Pelplin (7,784)
21. Skarszewy (6,994)
22. Gniew (6,707)
23. Żukowo (6,691)
24. Czarne (5,932)
25. Dzierzgoń (5,364)
26. Brusy (5,188)
27. Debrzno (5,096)
28. Nowy Staw (4,248)
29. Łeba (3,644)
30. Skórcz (3,625)
31. Kępice (3,580)
32. Hel (3,267)
33. Czarna Woda (2,786)
34. Jastarnia (2,704)
35. Kobylnica (2,248)
36. Krynica Morska (1,303)

== Administrative divisions ==
Pomeranian Voivodeship is divided into 20 counties (powiats): 4 city counties, and 16 land counties. These are further divided into 123 gminas (communes).

The counties are listed below in order of decreasing population.

English and Polish names	Area (km^{2})	Population (2019)	Seat	Other towns	Total gminas
City counties
Gdańsk	262	468,158			1
Gdynia	136	246,244			1
Słupsk	43.15	90,769			1
Sopot	17.31	35,827			1
Land counties
Wejherowo County powiat wejherowski	1,280	216,764	Wejherowo	Rumia, Reda	10
Starogard County powiat starogardzki	1,345	128,055	Starogard Gdański	Skarszewy, Skórcz, Czarna Woda	13
Tczew County powiat tczewski	698	115,738	Tczew	Pelplin, Gniew	6
Kartuzy County powiat kartuski	1,120	137,942	Kartuzy	Żukowo	8
Słupsk County powiat słupski	2,304	98,793	Słupsk *	Ustka, Kępice	10
Chojnice County powiat chojnicki	1,364	97,616	Chojnice	Czersk, Brusy	5
Gdańsk County powiat gdański	793	117,452	Pruszcz Gdański		8
Kwidzyn County powiat kwidzyński	835	83,231	Kwidzyn	Prabuty	6
Bytów County powiat bytowski	2,193	79,260	Bytów	Miastko	10
Puck County powiat pucki	578	86,203	Puck	Władysławowo, Jastarnia, Hel	7
Kościerzyna County powiat kościerski	1,166	72,589	Kościerzyna		8
Lębork County powiat lęborski	707	66,196	Lębork	Łeba	5
Malbork County powiat malborski	495	63,575	Malbork	Nowy Staw	6
Człuchów County powiat człuchowski	1,574	56,225	Człuchów	Czarne, Debrzno	7
Sztum County powiat sztumski	731	41,808	Sztum	Dzierzgoń	5
Nowy Dwór County powiat nowodworski (pomorski)	653	35,656	Nowy Dwór Gdański	Krynica Morska	5
* seat not part of the county

== Governors ==
=== Pomeranian Voivodeship (1466–1772) ===
No.	Portrait	Name (birth–death)	Term	Party
1		Jan z Jani (1400–1461)	10 May 1454 – 22 March 1461	Casimir IV
2		Otto Machwicz (??–1478)	19 May 1467 – 7 June 1477	Casimir IV
3		Fabian Legendorf-Mgowski (1425–1483)	10 March 1478 – 9 March 1483	Casimir IV
4		Jan Bajerski (1425–1484)	19 March 1483 – 1 June 1484	Casimir IV
5		Mikołaj Wulkowski (??–1509)	7 January 1485 – 9 December 1509	Casimir IV
6		Mikołaj Szpot (??–1518)	16 March 1512 – 21 May 1518	Sigismund I the Old
7		Jerzy Konopacki (1477–1543)	26 August 1518 – 28 February 1543	Sigismund I the Old
8		Mikołaj Działyński (??–1545)	16 January 1544 – 5 February 1545	Sigismund I the Old
9		Jan Sokołowski (??–1546)	22 May 1545 – 12 July 1546	Sigismund I the Old
10		Stanisław Kostka (1487–1555)	10 September 1546 – 2 May 1551	Sigismund I the Old
11		Jan Działyński (??–1583)	2 May 1551 – 5 January 1556	Sigismund II August
12		Fabian Czema	5 January 1556 – 20 November 1565	Sigismund II August
13		Achacy Czema (??–1576)	3 February 1566 – 29 November 1576	Sigismund II August
14		Krzysztof Kostka (1530–1594)	1577 – 5 August 1594	Stephen Báthory
15		Ludwik Mortęski (1554–1618)	20 October 1594 – 23 August 1611	Sigismund III Vasa
16		Michał Konarski (1557–1613)	1611 – 29 April 1613	Sigismund III Vasa
17		Samuel Żaliński	May 1613 – 3 November 1625	Sigismund III Vasa
18		Maciej Niemojewski (??–1625)	17 November 1625 – December 1625	Sigismund III Vasa
19		Samuel Konarski	9 February 1626 – 30 November 1629	Sigismund III Vasa
20		Paweł Jan Działyński (1594–1653)	16 May 1630 – 17 July 1643	Sigismund III Vasa
21		Gerhard Denhoff (1589–1648)	16 August 1643 – 23 December 1648	Władysław IV Vasa
22		Ludwik Wejher (??–1656)	December 1648 – 18 February 1656	Władysław IV Vasa
23		Stanisław Kobierzycki (1600–1665)	31 May 1656 – 1665	John II Casimir Vasa
24		Jan Ignacy Bąkowski (1615–1679)	8 March 1665 – 1677	John II Casimir Vasa
25		Władysław Denhoff (1639–1683)	1677 – 7 October 1683	John III Sobieski
26		Władysław Łoś (??–1694)	19 February 1684 – January 1694	John III Sobieski
27		Jan Gniński (??–1703)	24 February 1694 – 1703	John III Sobieski
28		Jan Ignacy Działyński (??–1724)	14 April 1703 – November 1724	Augustus II the Strong
29		Stefan Potocki (??–1730)	26 February 1726 – 9 March 1726	Augustus II the Strong
30		Piotr Jan Czapski (1685–1736)	11 March 1726 – 3 November 1736	Augustus II the Strong
31		Jakub Florian Narzymski (1690–1759)	8 July 1737 – 14 April 1758	Augustus III
32		Paweł Michał Mostowski (1721–1781)	20 April 1758 – 20 May 1766	Augustus III
33		Jan Jerzy Flemming (1699–1771)	22 May 1766 – 10 December 1771	Stanisław August Poniatowski
34		Ignacy Franciszek Przebendowski (1730–1791)	31 January 1772 – 18 March 1779	Stanisław August Poniatowski
35		Feliks Antoni Łoś (1737–1804)	5 June 1779 – 9 December 1790	Stanisław August Poniatowski
36		Józef Mier (1730–1808)	9 December 1790 – 24 November 1795	Stanisław August Poniatowski

=== West Prussia 1816-1919 ===
No.	Portrait	Name (birth–death)	Term	Party
1		Theodor von Schön (1773–1856)	1816 – 1829	Independent
2		Heinrich von Achenbach (1829–1899)	1878 – 1879	Free Conservative Party
3		Ernst von Ernsthausen (1827–1898)	1879 – 1888	German Conservative Party
4		Adolf Hilmar von Leipziger (1825–1891)	1888 – 1891	Independent
5		Gustav von Goßler (1838–1902)	1891 – 1902	German Conservative Party
6		Clemens von Delbrück (1856–1921)	1902 – 1905	Independent
7		Ernst Ludwig von Jagow (1853–1930)	1905 – 1919	Independent

=== Pomeranian Voivodeship (1919-1939) ===
No.	Portrait	Name (birth–death)	Term	Party
1		Stefan Łaszewski (1862–1924)	19 October 1919 – 21 July 1920	Popular National Union
2		Jan Brejski (1863–1934)	27 July 1920 – 16 May 1924	Independent
3		Stanisław Wachowiak (1890–1972)	16 May 1924 – 12 October 1926	National Workers' Party
4		Kazimierz Młodzianowski (1880–1928)	18 October 1926 – 4 July 1928	Independent
5		Wiktor Lamot (1891–1959)	12 July 1929 – 18 November 1931	Independent
6		Stefan Kirtiklis (1890–1951)	21 November 1931 – 14 July 1936	Independent
7		Władysław Raczkiewicz (1885–1947)	17 July 1936 – 5 September 1939	Independent

=== Reichsgau Danzig-West Prussia ===
No.	Portrait	Name (birth–death)	Term	Party
1		Albert Forster (1902–1952)	26 October 1939 – 27 March 1945	Nazi Party

=== Gdańsk Voivodeship (1945–1975) ===
No.	Portrait	Name (birth–death)	Term	Party
1		Mieczysław Okęcki (1882–1952)	30 March 1945 – February 1946	Polish United Workers' Party
2		Stanisław Zrałek (1907–1954)	February 1946 – May 1950	Polish United Workers' Party
3		Mieczysław Wągrowski (1902–1967)	25 May 1950 – 28 March 1952	Polish United Workers' Party
4		Bolesław Geraga (1912–1986)	April 1952 – February 1954	Polish United Workers' Party
5		Walenty Szeliga (??–??)	4 March 1954 – 26 November 1956	Polish United Workers' Party
6		Józef Wołek (1913–1985)	26 November 1956 – 16 November 1960	Polish United Workers' Party
7		Piotr Stolarek (1908–1976)	1960 – 1969	Polish United Workers' Party
8		Tadeusz Bejm (1929–1988)	1969 – 1972	Polish United Workers' Party
9		Henryk Śliwowski (1920–1984)	1972 – 31 May 1975	Polish United Workers' Party

=== Gdańsk Voivodeship (1975–1998) ===
No.	Portrait	Name (birth–death)	Term	Party
1		Henryk Śliwowski (1920–1984)	1 June 1975 – 15 January 1979	Polish United Workers' Party
2		Jerzy Kołodziejski (1933–2001)	1979 – 1982	Polish United Workers' Party
3		Mieczysław Cygan (1921–2006)	1982 – 1988	Polish United Workers' Party
4		Jerzy Jędykiewicz (1946–living)	22 December 1988 – 3 August 1990	Polish United Workers' Party
5		Maciej Płażyński (1958–2010)	4 August 1990 – 11 July 1996	Independent
6		Henryk Wojciechowski (1948–living)	July 1996 – December 1997	Democratic Left Alliance

=== Pomeranian Voivodeship 1998-present ===
No.	Portrait	Name (birth–death)	Term	Party
1		Tomasz Sowiński (1965–living)	1 January 1998 – 20 October 2001	Solidarity Electoral Action
2		Jan Ryszard Kurylczyk (1945–living)	20 October 2001 – 26 July 2004	Democratic Left Alliance
3		Cezary Dąbrowski (1941–2023)	26 July 2004 – 24 January 2006	Democratic Left Alliance
4		Piotr Ołowski (1963–living)	26 January 2006 – 26 February 2007	Law & Justice
5		Piotr Karczewski (1964–living)	22 May 2007 – 29 November 2007	Law & Justice
6		Roman Zaborowski (1956–living)	29 November 2007 – 25 October 2011	Civic Platform
7		Ryszard Stachurski (1950–living)	12 December 2011 – 8 December 2015	Civic Platform
8		Dariusz Drelich (1967–living)	8 December 2015 – 20 December 2023	Law & Justice
9		Beata Rutkiewicz (1977–living)	20 December 2023 – Incumbent	Independent

=== Timeline since 1919 ===
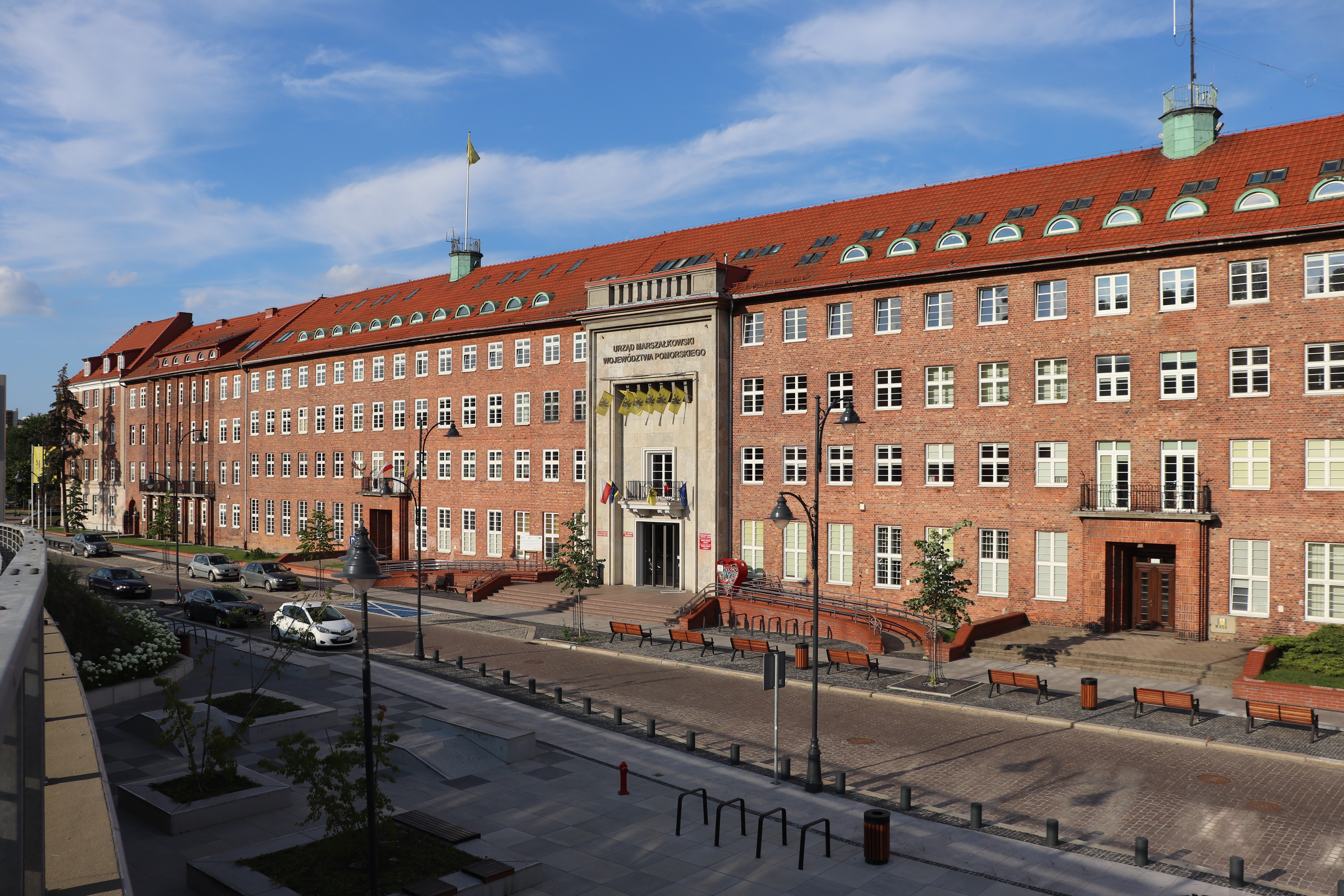
Pomeranian Voivodeship Office in Gdańsk

== Economy ==
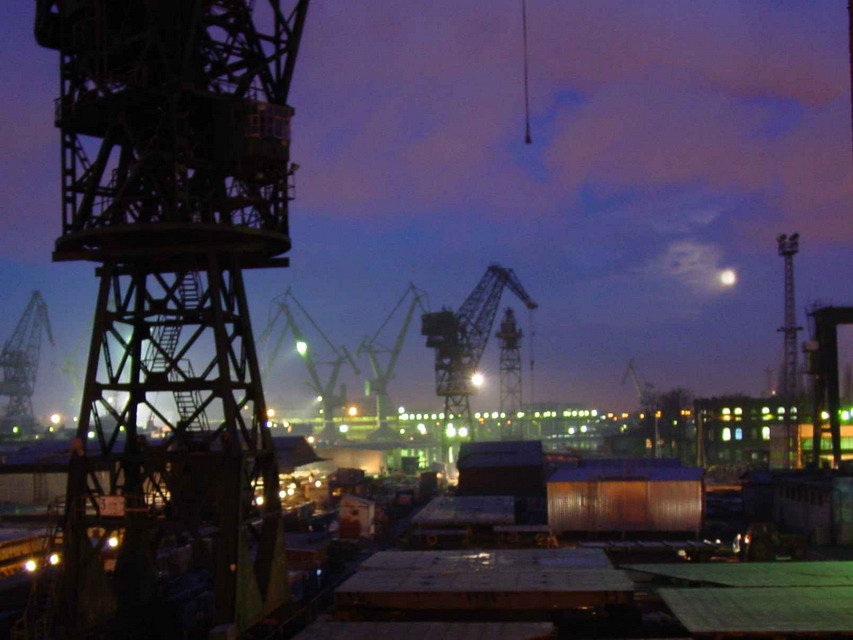
Gdańsk seaport

The Gross domestic product (GDP) of the province was 29.2 billion euros in 2018, accounting for 5.9% of Polish economic output. GDP per capita adjusted for purchasing power was 20,800 euros or 69% of the EU27 average in the same year. The GDP per employee was 74% of the EU average.

=== Major corporations ===
Corporation name Further information	Location	Kind of activity
Energa Gdańsk Power Generator	Gdańsk	energy supplies
Ergo Hestia	Sopot	insurance
Gdańsk Repair Yard	Gdańsk	repair shipyard
Gdynia Stocznia	Gdynia	shipyard
GE Capital Bank	Gdańsk	banking
Grupa LOTOS	Gdańsk	petroleum products
Intel Technology Poland	Gdańsk	hardware
International Paper Kwidzyn	Kwidzyn	paper products
Lubiana	Łubiana near Kościerzyna	china-ware manufacturer
Philips Consumer Electronics	Kwidzyn	electronics
Polpharma	Starogard Gdański	medicines
Prokom Software	Gdynia	software
Destylarnia Sobieski	Starogard Gdański	distillery
Elnord	Gdańsk	energy supplies
LPP	Gdańsk	designing and distributing clothes

== Transport ==
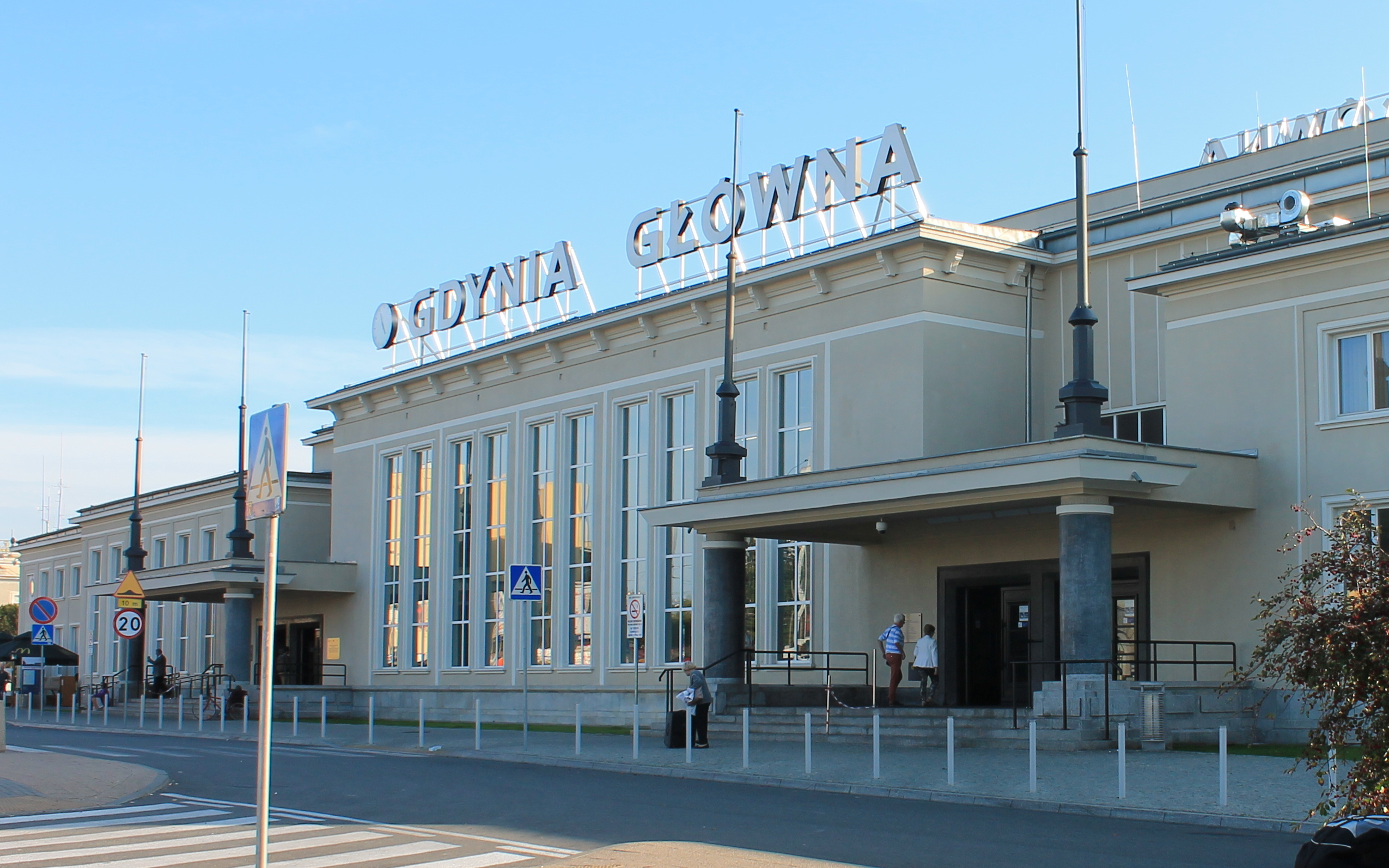
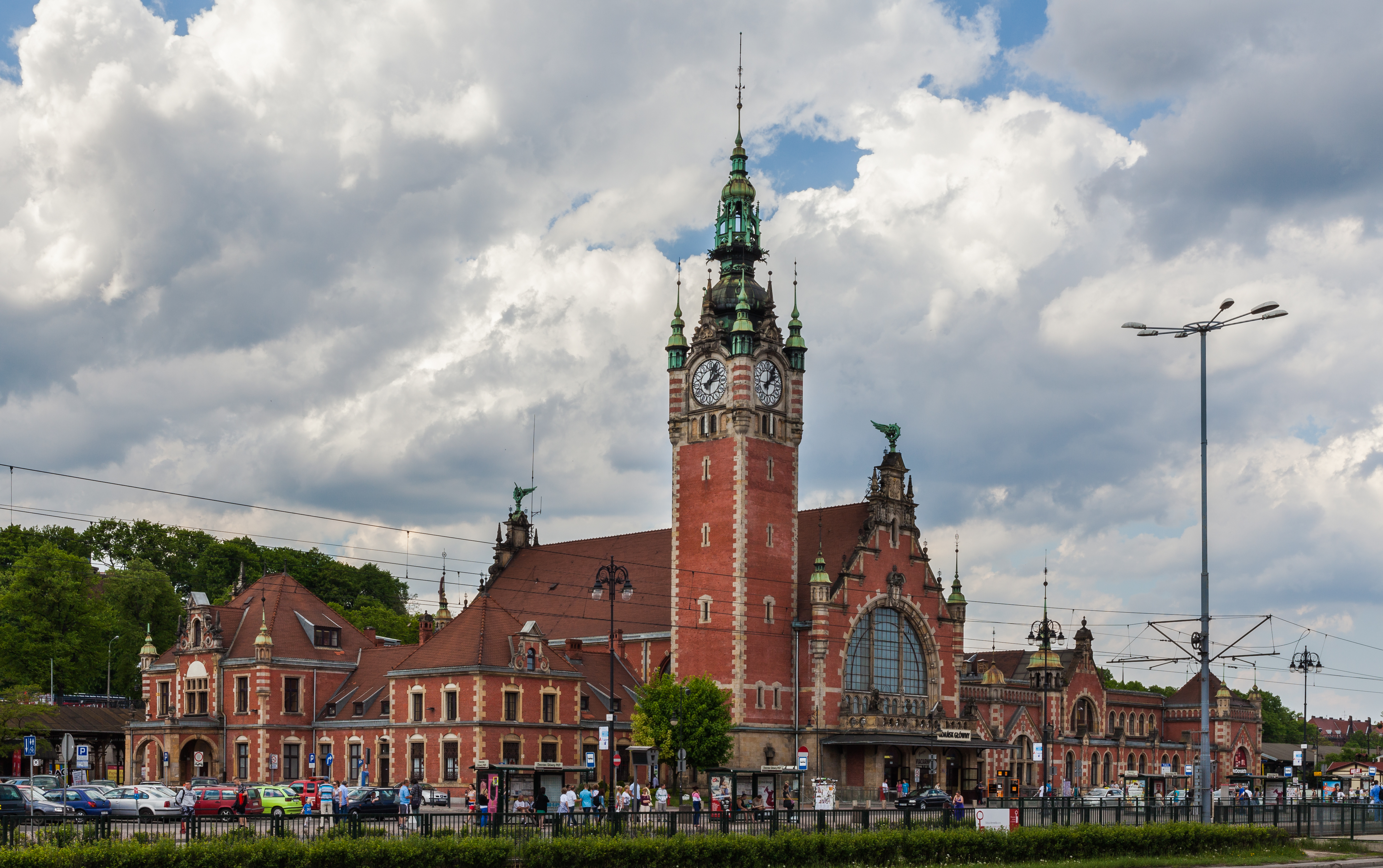
Gdynia Główna and Gdańsk Główny railway stations
- Gdańsk Lech Wałęsa Airport
- Obwodnica Trójmiejska

The A1, S6 and S7 highways pass through the province.

=== Railway ===
- Pomorska Kolej Metropolitalna
- SKM

The three busiest railway stations of northern Poland, and three of ten busiest railway stations of Poland overall, are located in the voivodeship. Those are Gdynia Główna, Gdańsk Główny and Gdańsk Wrzeszcz.

== Education ==
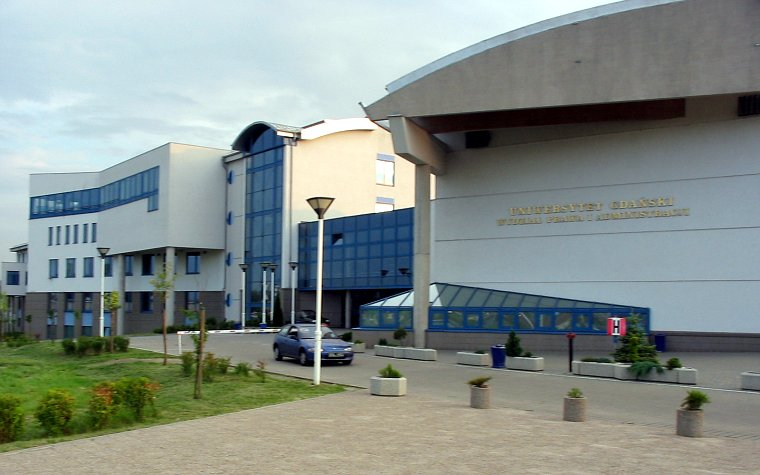
Gdańsk University Faculty of Law, in Gdańsk-Przymorze

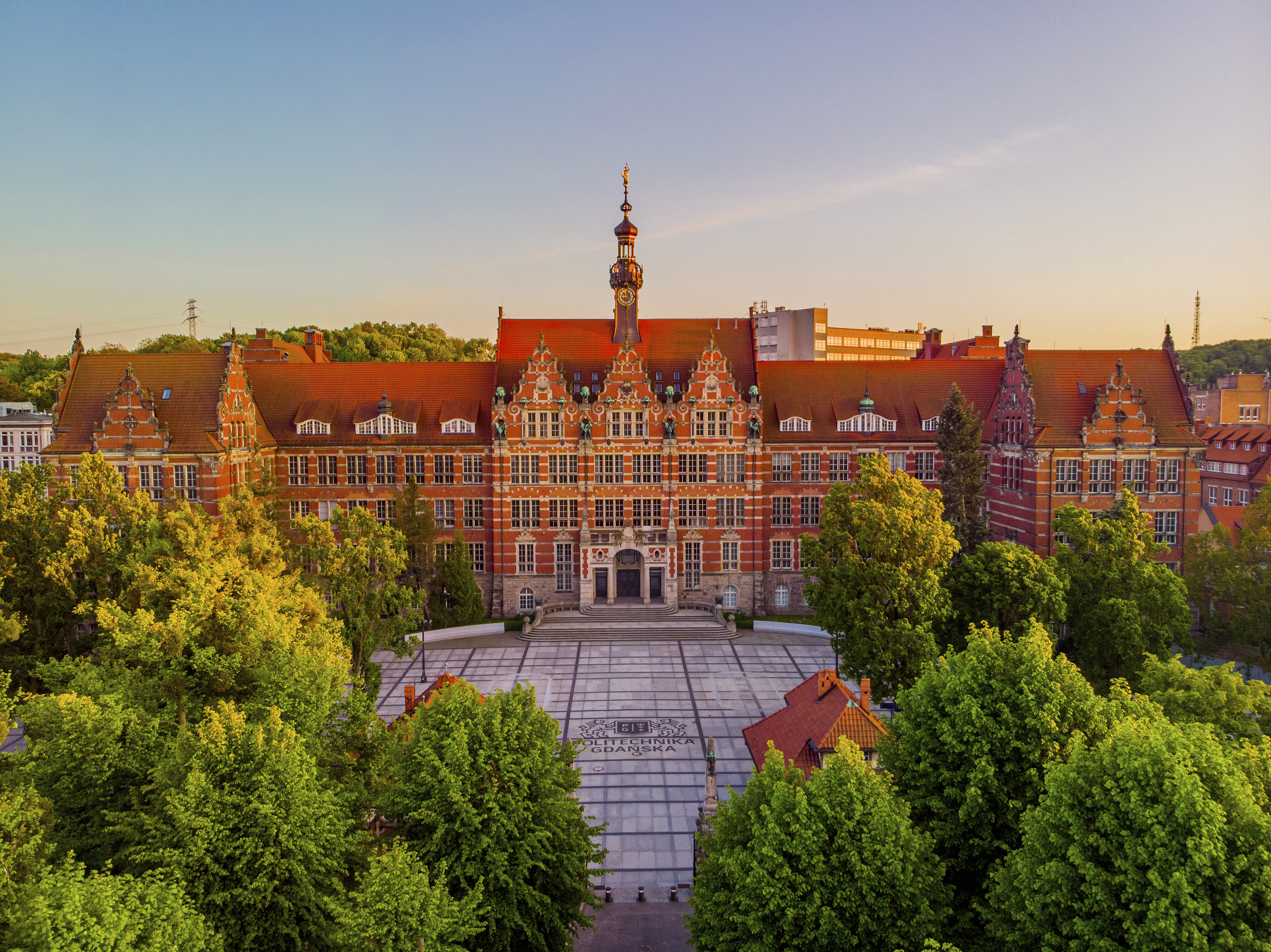
Main building, Gdańsk University of Technology

=== Higher education ===
Name	Location	Students in thousands	
Name	Location	total	of which women
Total	-	97.9	55.3
Uniwersytet Gdański (Gdańsk University)	Tricity	29.3	19.4
Politechnika Gdańska (Gdańsk University of Technology)	Gdańsk	17.6	5.9
Akademia Pomorska w Słupsku (Pomeranian Academy in Słupsk)	Słupsk	8.1	6.0
Akademia Medyczna w Gdańsku (Medical University of Gdańsk)	Gdańsk	4.2	3.1
Akademia Wychowanie Fizycznego i Sportu w Gdańsku (Gdańsk Sports Academy)	Gdańsk	4.1	1.9
Akademia Sztuk Pięknych w Gdańsku (Gdańsk Academy of Fine Arts)	Gdańsk	0.9	0.7
Akademia Marynarki Wojennej im. Bohaterów Westerplatte (Polish Naval Academy)	Gdynia	.	.
Akademia Morska w Gdyni (Gdynia Maritime Academy)	Gdynia	.	.
Gdańskie Seminarium Duchowne (Gdańsk Seminary)	Gdańsk	.	.
Akademia Muzyczna im. Stanisława Moniuszki w Gdańsku (Stanisław Moniuszko Academy of Music, in Gdańsk)	Gdańsk	.	.
Data as of 31 November 2005, source http://www.stat.gov.pl

== Protected areas ==
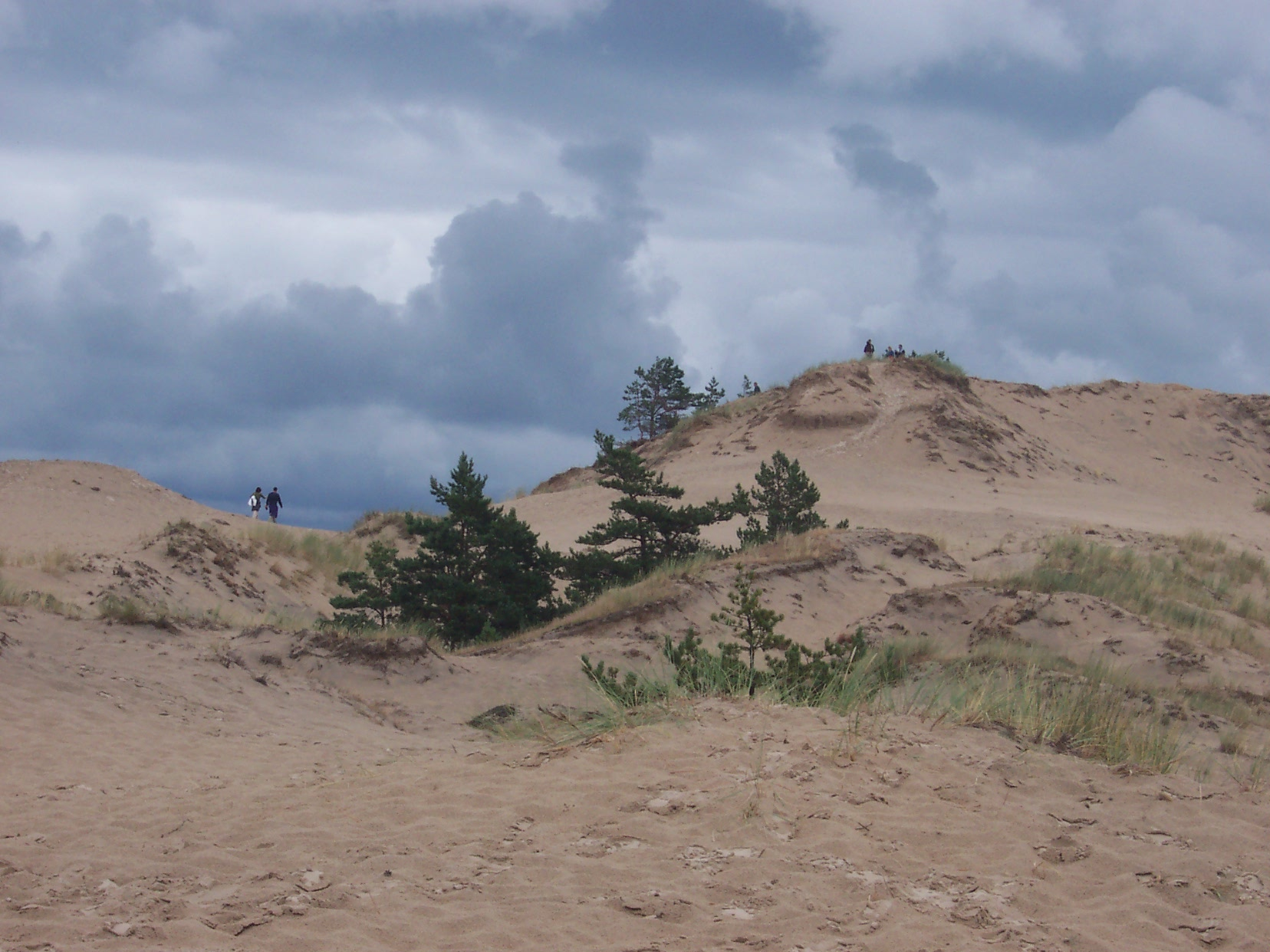
Dunes, Słowiński National Park

Protected areas in Pomeranian Voivodeship include two National Parks and nine Landscape Parks. These are listed below.

- Słowiński National Park (a UNESCO-designated biosphere reserve)
- Tuchola Forest National Park (part of a UNESCO-designated biosphere reserve)
- Coastal Landscape Park
- Iława Lake District Landscape Park (partly in Warmian-Masurian Voivodeship)
- Kashubian Landscape Park
- Słupia Valley Landscape Park
- Tricity Landscape Park
- Tuchola Landscape Park (partly in Kuyavian-Pomeranian Voivodeship)
- Vistula Spit Landscape Park
- Wdydze Landscape Park
- Zaborski Landscape Park

== Sports ==
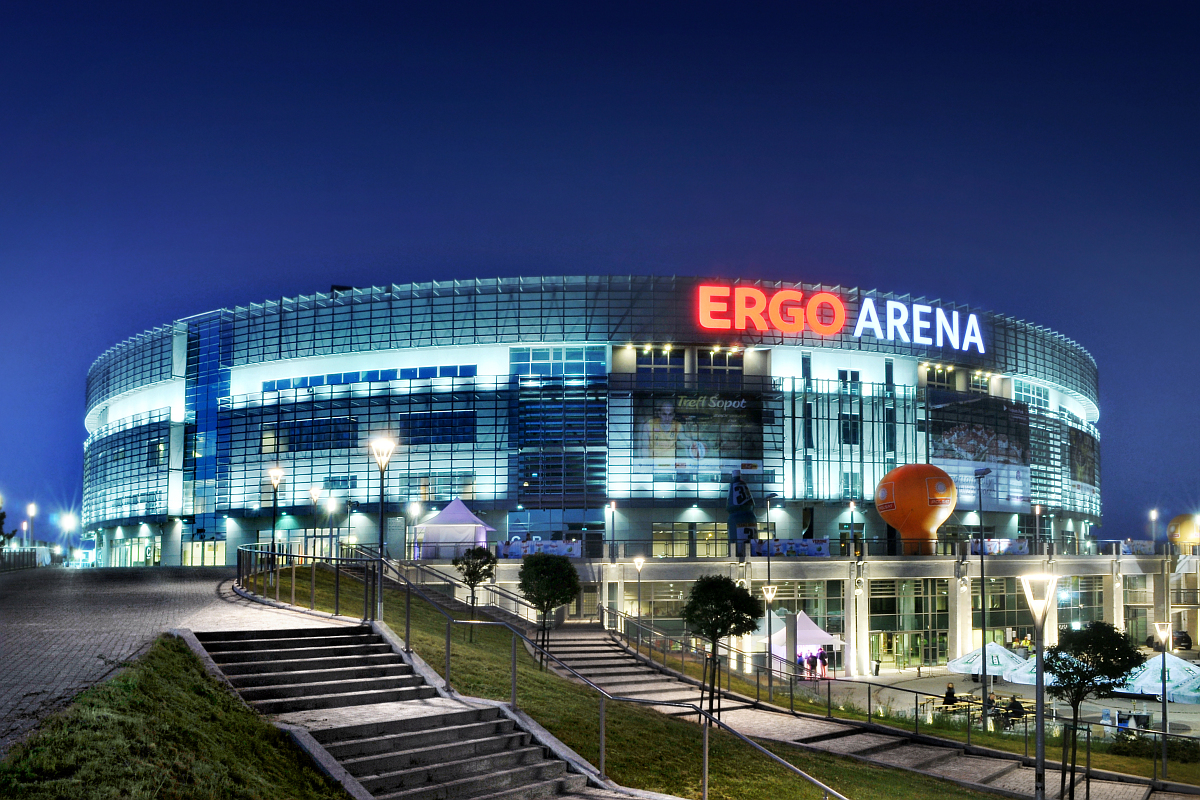
Ergo Arena on the boundary between Gdańsk and Sopot, home venue of the Trefl Sopot basketball team and Trefl Gdańsk volleyball team

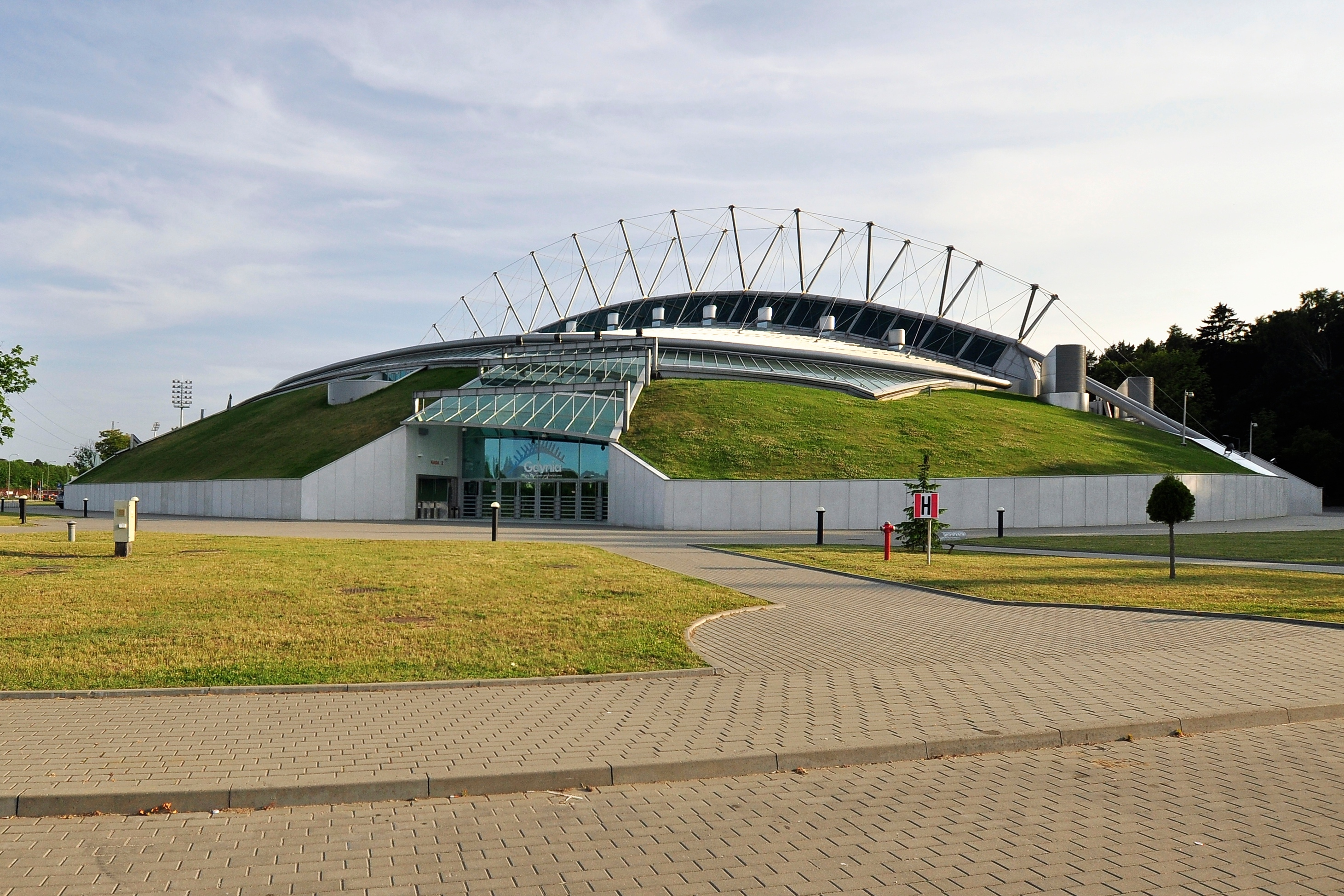
Gdynia Arena, home venue of the Arka Gdynia basketball teams and SPR Gdynia handball team

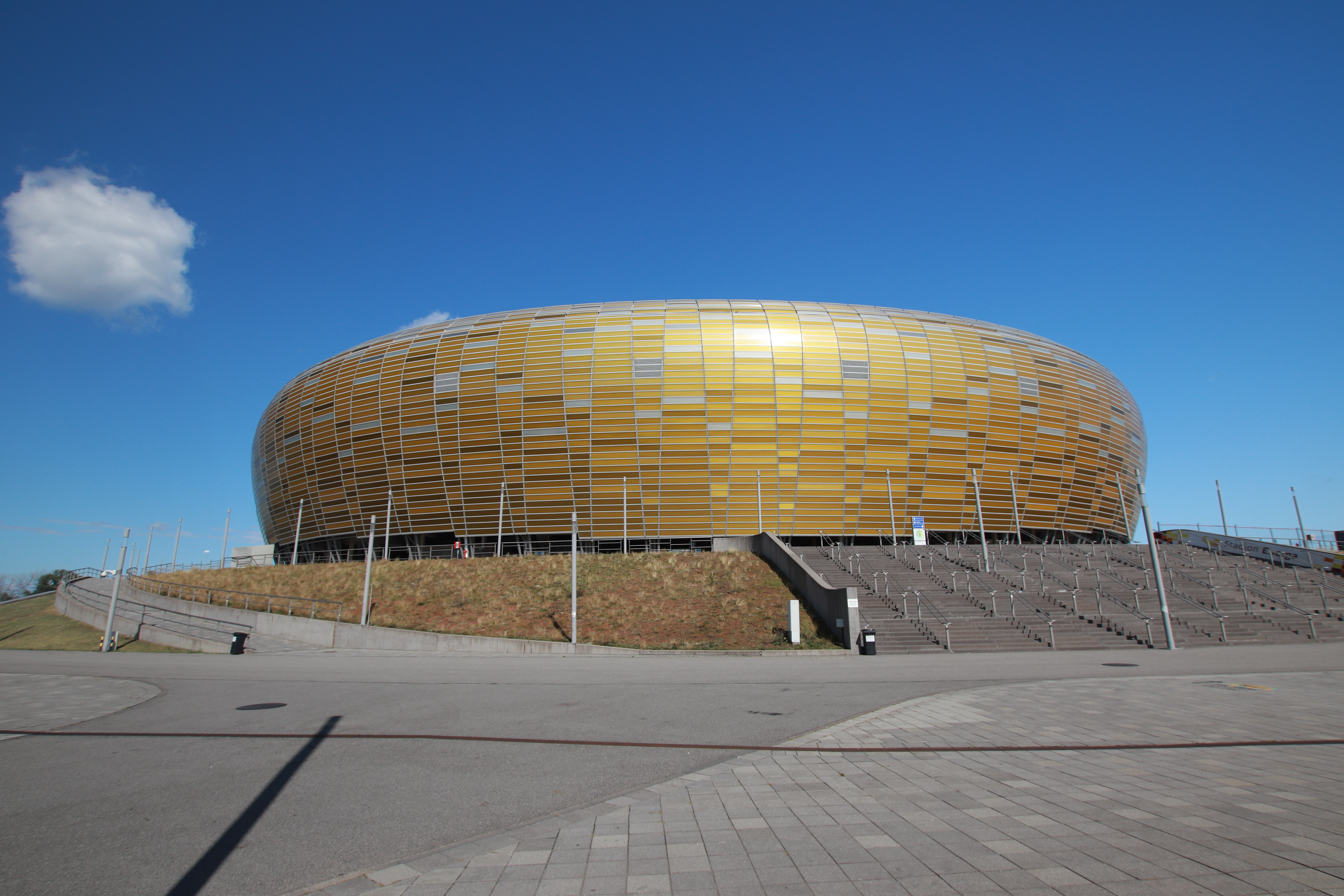
Gdańsk Stadium, home venue of the Lechia Gdańsk football team

Football, basketball, motorcycle speedway and volleyball enjoy the largest following in the voivodeship. The Arka Gdynia and Lechia Gdańsk football clubs contest the Tricity Derby, the fiercest football rivalry in northern Poland.

Since the establishment of the province, several major international sports competitions were co-hosted by the province, including the EuroBasket 2009, UEFA Euro 2012, 2013 Men's European Volleyball Championship, 2014 FIVB Volleyball Men's World Championship, 2016 European Men's Handball Championship, 2017 Men's European Volleyball Championship, 2019 FIFA U-20 World Cup, 2021 Men's European Volleyball Championship, 2023 World Men's Handball Championship.

Professional sports teams
Club	Sport	League	Trophies
Arka Gdynia	Basketball (men's)	Polish Basketball League	9 Polish Championships; 4 Polish Cups (2000, 2001, 2006, 2008)
Trefl Sopot	Basketball (men's)	Polish Basketball League	1 Polish Championship (2024); 4 Polish Cups (2012, 2013, 2023, 2026)
Czarni Słupsk	Basketball (men's)	Polish Basketball League	0
SKS Starogard Gdański	Basketball (men's)	I Liga	1 Polish Cup (2011)
Decka Pelplin	Basketball (men's)	I Liga	0
Arka Gdynia	Basketball (women's)	Basket Liga Kobiet	14 Polish Championships; 10 Polish Cups
Arka Gdynia	Football (men's)	I liga	2 Polish Cups (1979, 2017)
Lechia Gdańsk	Football (men's)	I liga	2 Polish Cups (1983, 2019)
Chojniczanka Chojnice	Football (men's)	II liga	0
APLG Gdańsk	Football (women's)	Ekstraliga	0
Pogoń Tczew	Football (women's)	Ekstraliga	0
Wybrzeże Gdańsk	Speedway	I liga	0
MMTS Kwidzyn	Handball (men's)	Superliga	0
Wybrzeże Gdańsk	Handball (men's)	Superliga	10 Polish Championships
KPR Żukowo	Handball (men's)	Liga Centralna	0
SPR Gdynia	Handball (women's)	Liga Centralna	2 Polish Championships (2012, 2017); 3 Polish Cups (2014, 2015, 2016)
Trefl Gdańsk	Volleyball (men's)	PlusLiga	2 Polish Cups (2015, 2018)
Ogniwo Sopot	Rugby union	Ekstraliga	11 Polish Championships; 10 Polish Cups
RC Arka Gdynia	Rugby union	Ekstraliga	4 Polish Championships; 1 Polish Cup (2010)
RC Lechia Gdańsk	Rugby union	Ekstraliga	13 Polish Championships; 12 Polish Cups

== Curiosities ==
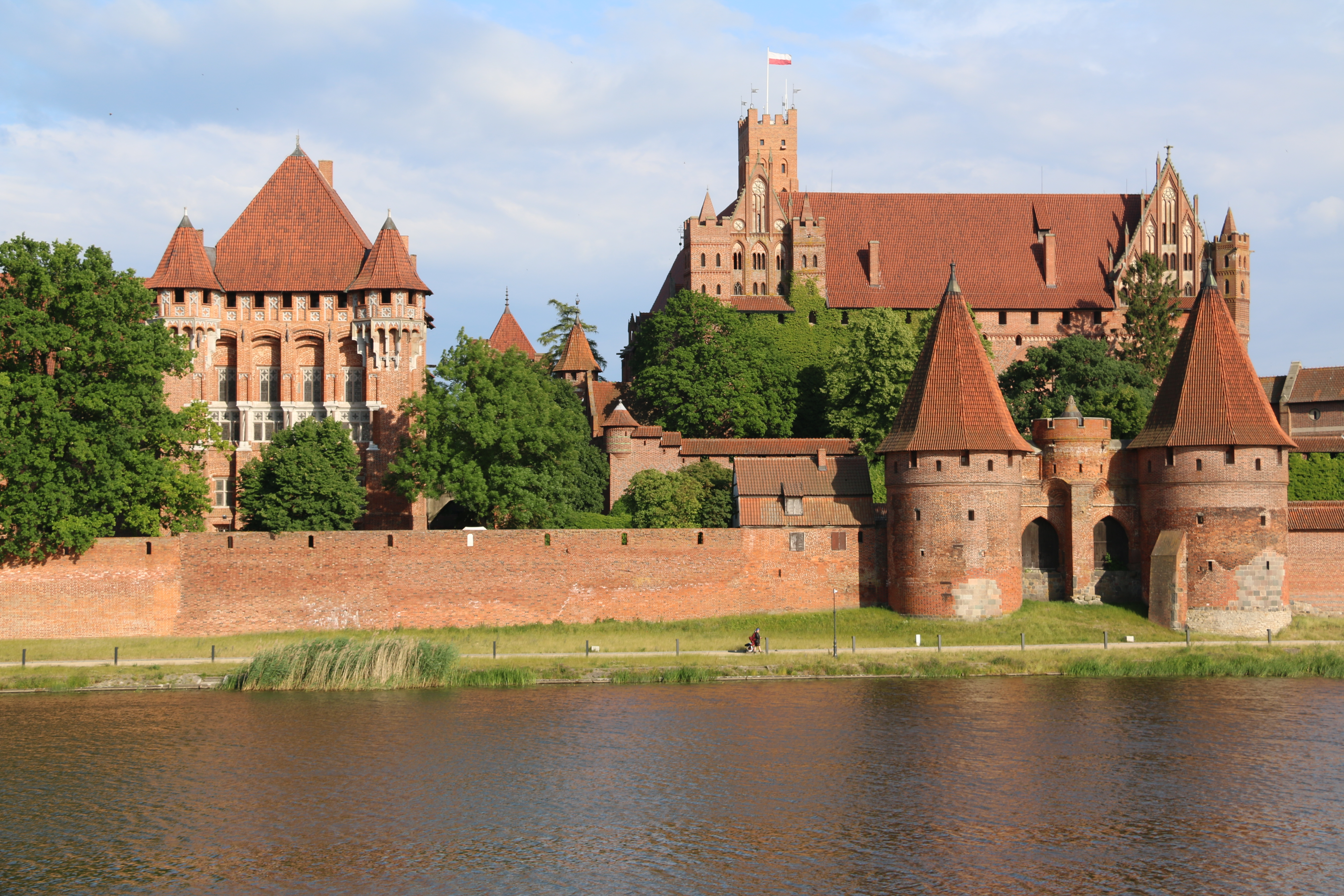
Malbork Castle, UNESCO World Heritage Site and Historic Monument of Poland

- There are two spa towns in the province: Sopot and Ustka.
- The provincial capital of Gdańsk was the largest city of Poland for over 250 years, from the mid-15th century to the early 18th century, when it was surpassed by the national capital of Warsaw. Gdańsk has five sites listed as Historic Monuments of Poland, a joint record with Kraków, including its historic city center.
- There are numerous castles in the province, and the Kwidzyn and Malbork castles are listed as Historic Monuments of Poland, with the latter also designated a UNESCO World Heritage Site.
- The longest wooden pier in Europe, the Sopot Pier, is located in the voivodeship.
- In 1380, the first Scots settled in Gdańsk, founding what would eventually become a significant Scottish diaspora in Poland, and later on, Scots also lived in Chojnice, Czarne, Człuchów, Debrzno, Gniew, Kościerzyna, Puck, Starogard Gdański, Tczew. The Stare Szkoty neighbourhood of Gdańsk is named after the Scottish settlers.
- One of the three parish churches of the Armenian Catholic Church in Poland is located in Gdańsk (see also: Armenians in Poland).
- The voivodeship features several places where major international treaties were signed in the past, i.e. the Dano-Polish truce of 1458 and Polish-Swedish alliance of 1677, both signed in Gdańsk, the Polish-Swedish truces of 1629 and 1635 signed in Stary Targ and Sztumska Wieś, respectively, and the peace treaty ending the Second Northern War of 1655–1660.
- Sztutowo is the location of the former Stutthof concentration camp, the first Nazi German concentration camp established outside of pre-war Germany during World War II.
- The Westerplatte peninsula in Gdańsk was the site of the Battle of Westerplatte, the first battle of the German invasion of Poland and World War II, and is now designated a Historic Monument of Poland.
- During World War II, the Stalag II-B and Stalag XX-B major prisoner-of-war camps for Polish, British, French, Belgian, Serbian, Dutch, Soviet, Italian, American, Australian, New Zealander, Canadian, Senegalese, Malagasy, Tunisian, Moroccan, Algerian and other Allied POWs were operated in the territory by Nazi Germany. There are cemeteries of the POWs at the sites in Czarne and Malbork.
- There are numerous memorials at the sites of Nazi massacres of Poles from World War II, including the largest massacres in Piaśnica, Szpęgawsk and Chojnice.
- The Pomeranian Voivodeship is one of four first-level administrative divisions containing the name of the region of Pomerania, the other being the neighbouring West Pomeranian Voivodeship and Kuyavian-Pomeranian Voivodeship in Poland, and Mecklenburg-Vorpommern in Germany.
