= Sztum Castle =

Castle in Poland

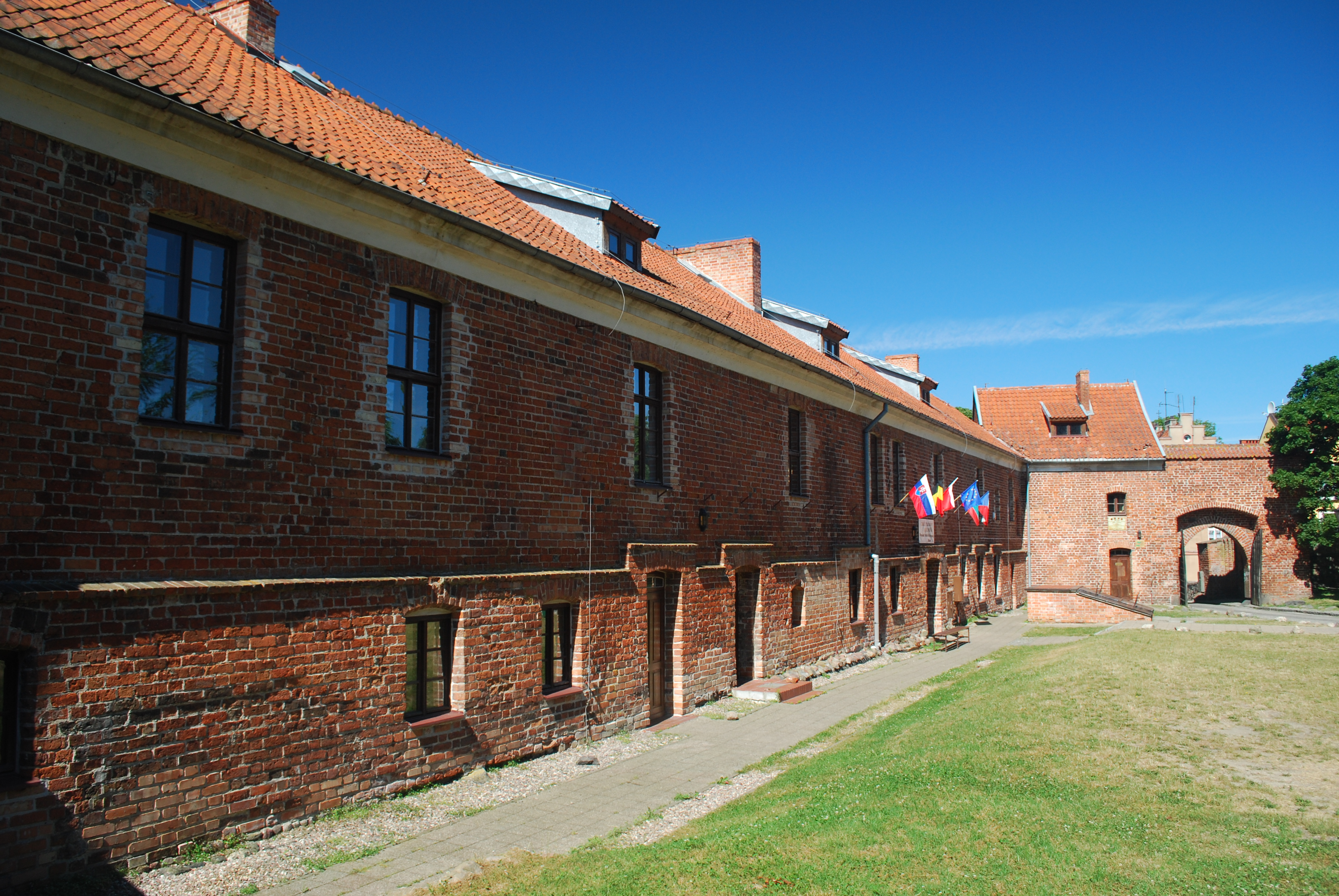
- Sztum Castle

- Location of the Sztum Castle in Poland
- 53°54′54″N 19°02′24″E

History
- Built: 1326-1335

Site notes
- Architectural style: Gothic

Sztum Castle (Polish: Zamek w Sztumie) is a castle located by Lake Zajezierskie, on Galla Anonima Street.

== History ==
The castle was built in the Gothic architectural style in the years of 1326 to 1335, in the shape of a polygon with two towers, in the location of a former Old Prussian gord. The castle functioned as the headquarters of a Prussian Vogt. The castle became part of the Kingdom of Poland in 1410. After the Thirteen Years' War (1454–66), the castle became the headquarters for the Starosta. The castle was destroyed during the Deluge wars with the Swedish Empire, and partially deconstructed by the Prussians. Currently, two wings of the castle exist which were reconstructed in the nineteenth century, the prison tower, gates and fortification walls. The castle was the formerly housed the Sztum Centre of Culture (Sztumskie Centrum Kultury).

== See also ==
- Malbork Castle
- Kwidzyn Castle
