= Dansker =

Castle tower toilet adjoined by a bridge

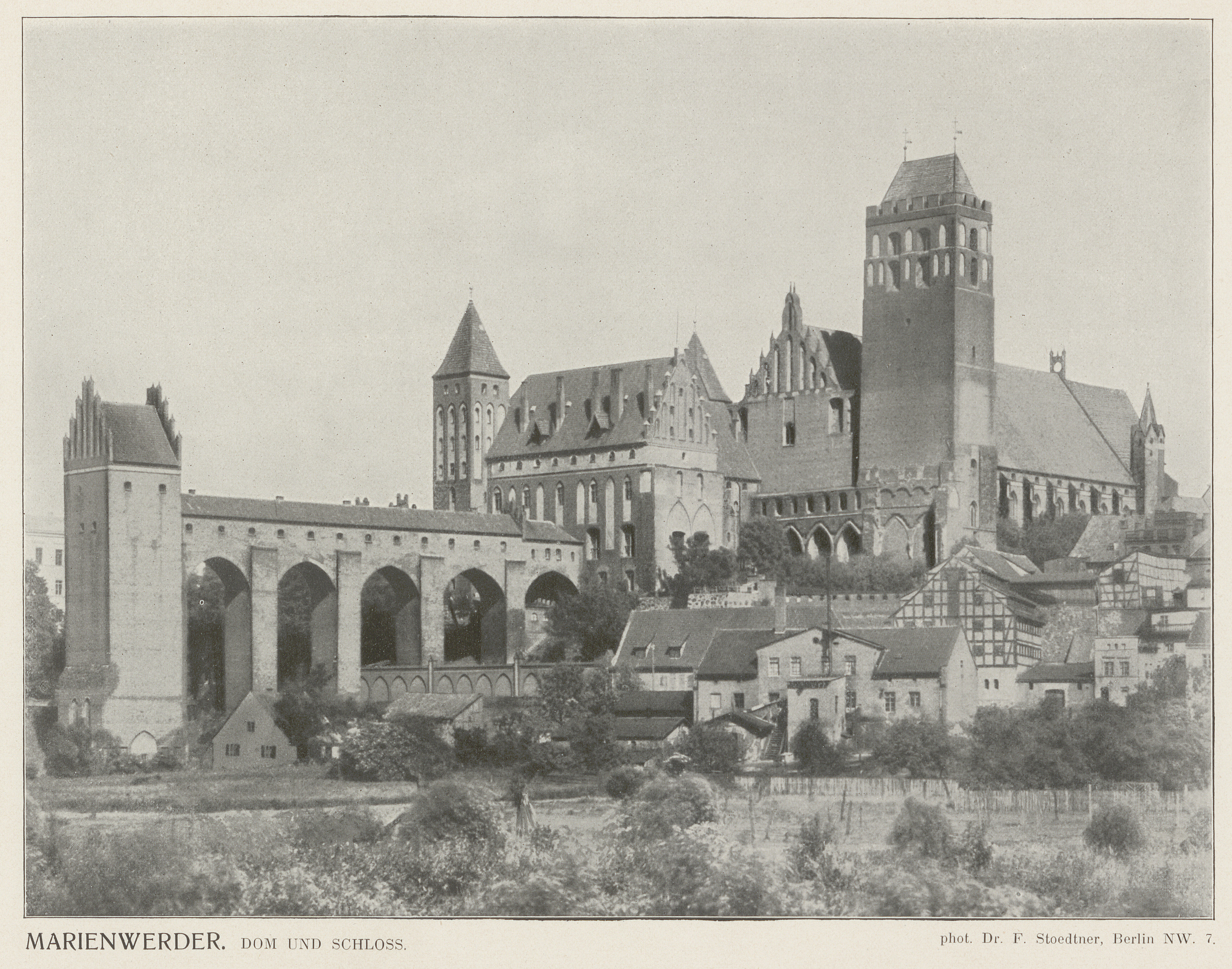
The dansker at Kwidzyn Castle

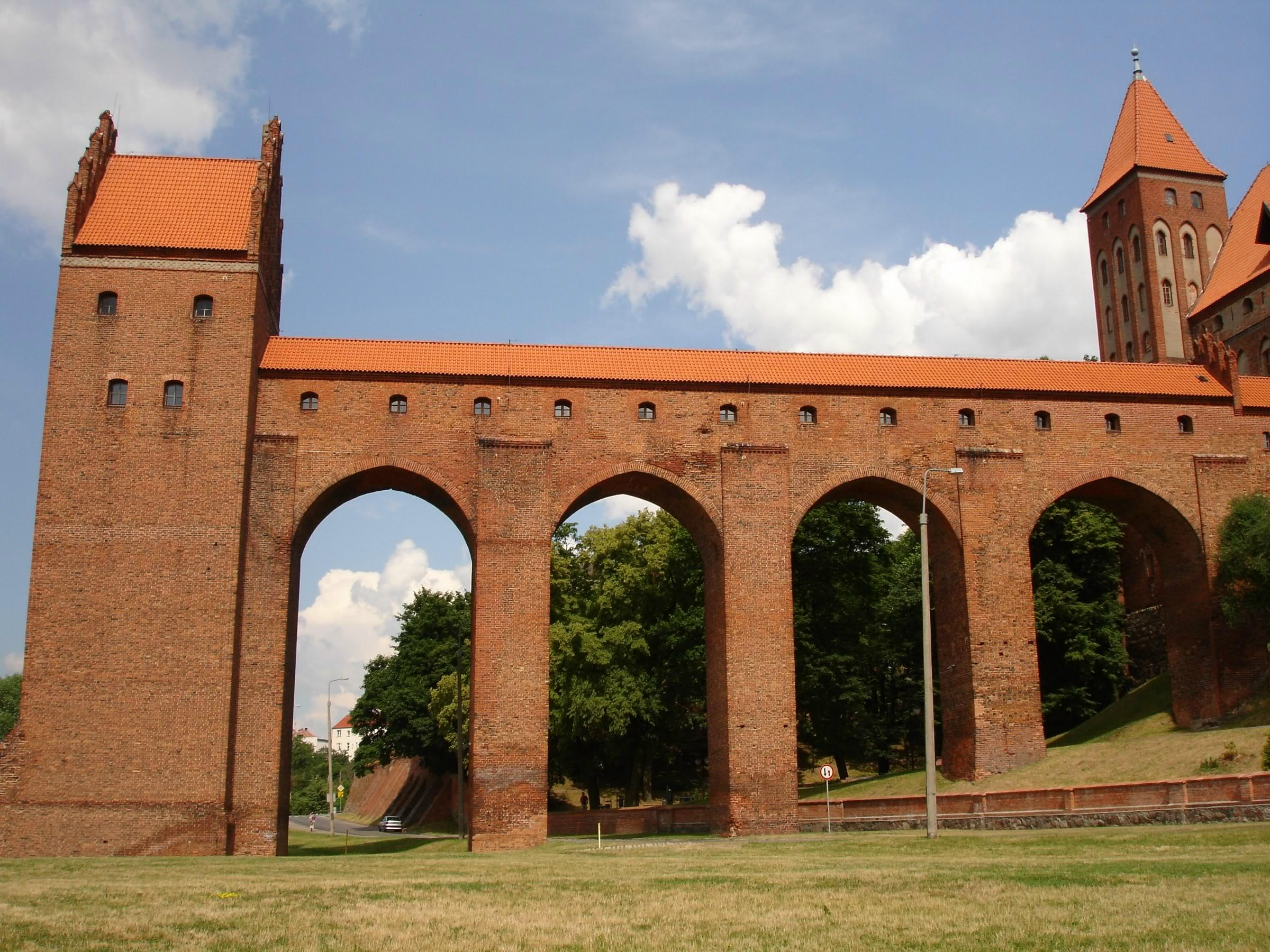
The dansker at Kwidzyn Castle

A dansker (also danzker) is a toilet facility, belonging to a castle, that is housed in a tower over a river or stream. The tower, a type of garderobe tower, is linked to the castle over a bridge, which has a covered or enclosed walkway. The dansker is frequently found on German Ordensburgen and is an architectural feature of the 13th and 14th centuries.

The origin of the word, first used in 1393, probably comes from the town of Danzig.

A famous example is the dansker at Kwidzyn Castle in Poland, although it was rebuilt in the 19th century and no longer retains its medieval appearance.

If danskers or a garderobe were not available, outhouses served as toilet facilities in castles. However, if many people stayed in the castle permanently, these were no longer sufficient, and a separate exit over running water was then more appropriate. That is why Dansker are mainly found at German Ordensburgen, which were constantly occupied by a large number of knights.
