= Garderobe =

Privy in medieval and Renaissance castles

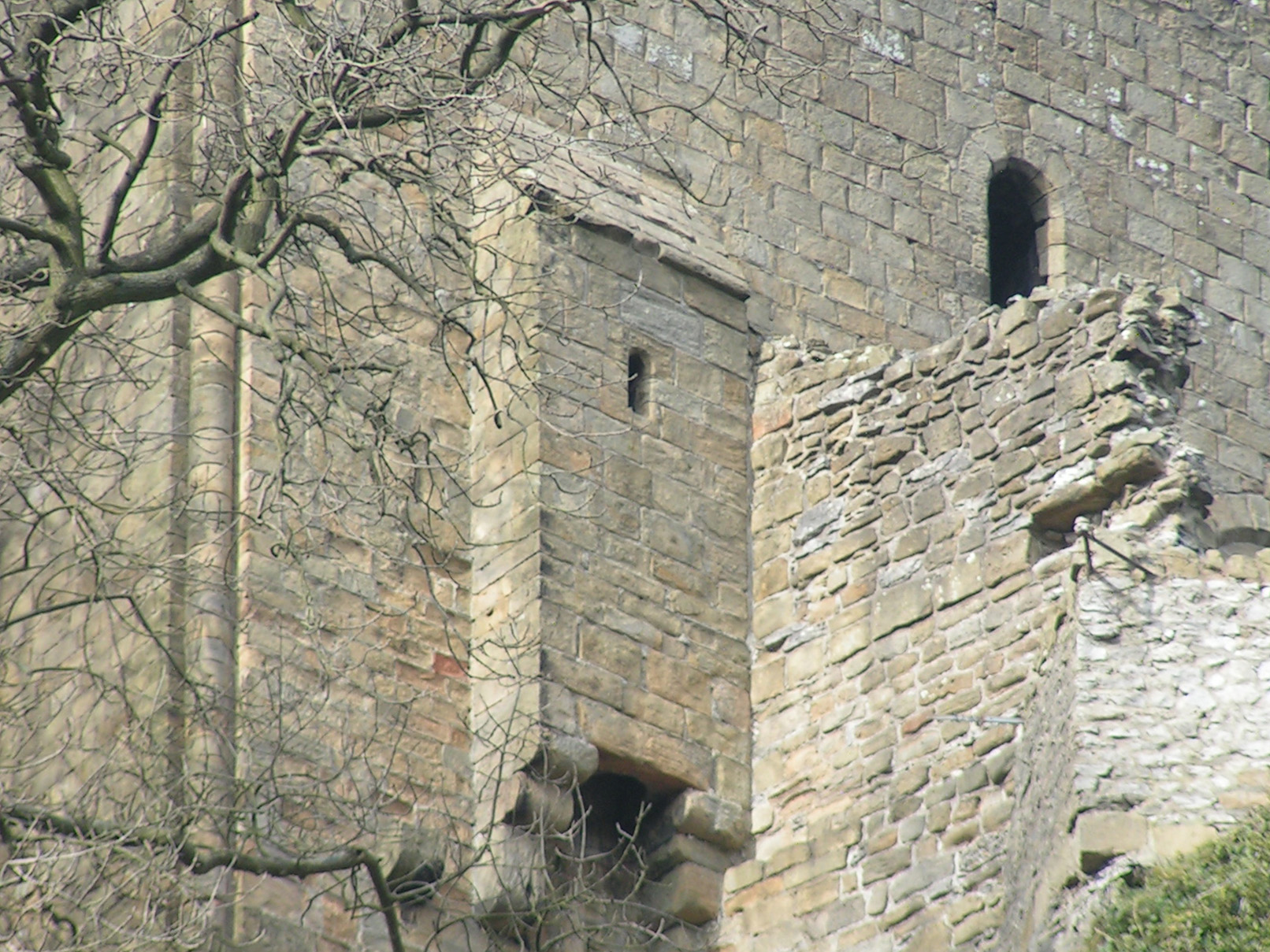
The rectangular structure protruding from the walls of Peveril Castle in England, with a bottom opening between consoles, is a 'garderobe'.

Garderobe is a historic term for a room in a medieval castle. The Oxford English Dictionary gives as its first meaning a store-room for valuables, but also acknowledges "by extension, a private room, a bed-chamber; also a privy".

The word derives from the French garde de robes, meaning "robes (or clothing) protector". Its most common use now is as a term for a castle toilet.

== Store room ==
Garderobe is the French word for "wardrobe", a lockable place where clothes and other items are stored. According to medieval architecture scholar Frank Bottomley, garderobes were at first "[p]roperly, not a latrine or privy but a small room or large cupboard, usually adjoining the chamber [bedroom] or solar [living room] and providing safe-keeping for valuable clothes and other possessions of price: cloth, jewels, spices, plate and money."

== Toilet ==
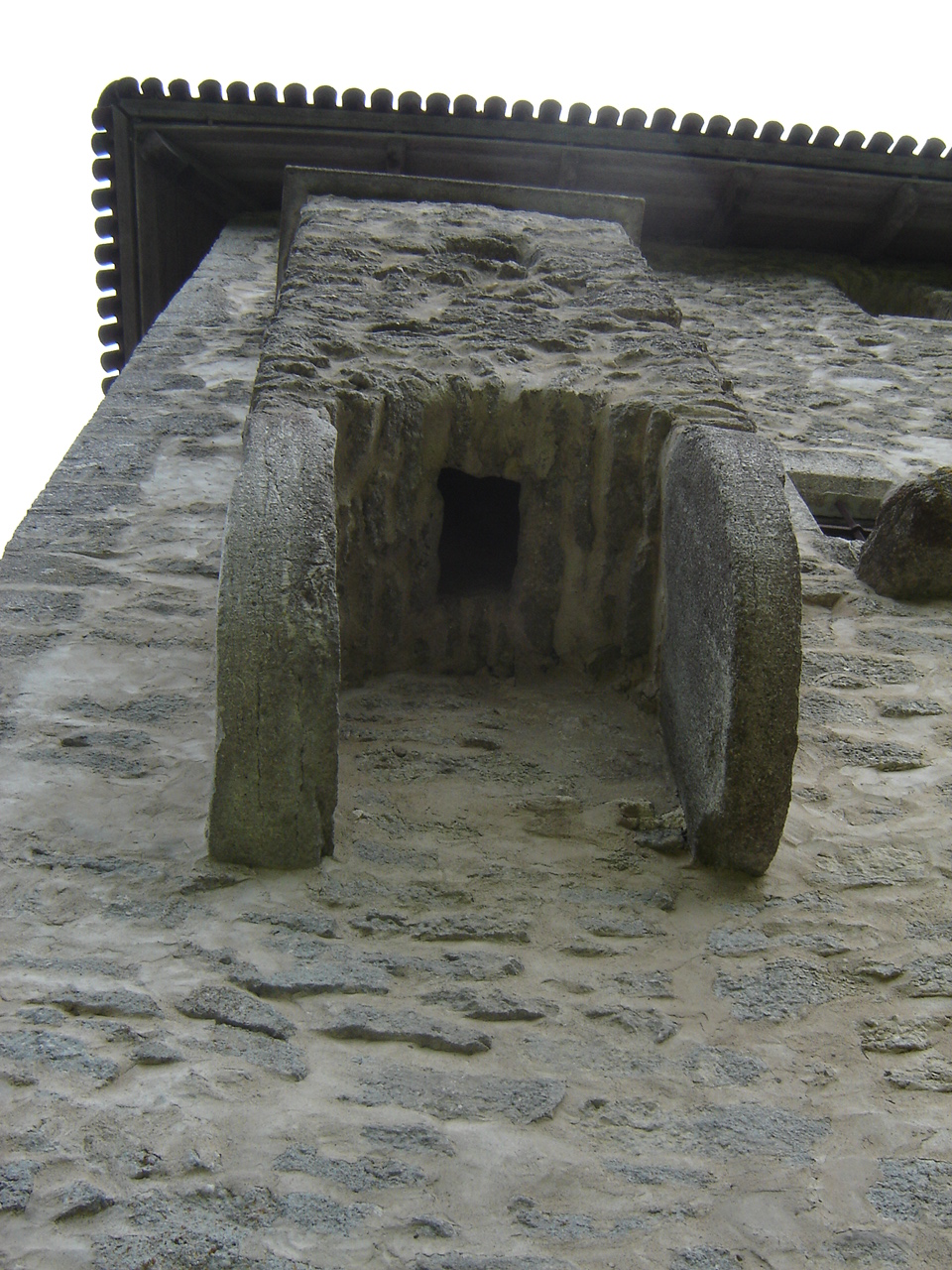
A privy or garderobe at Vao Castle in Estonia: exterior

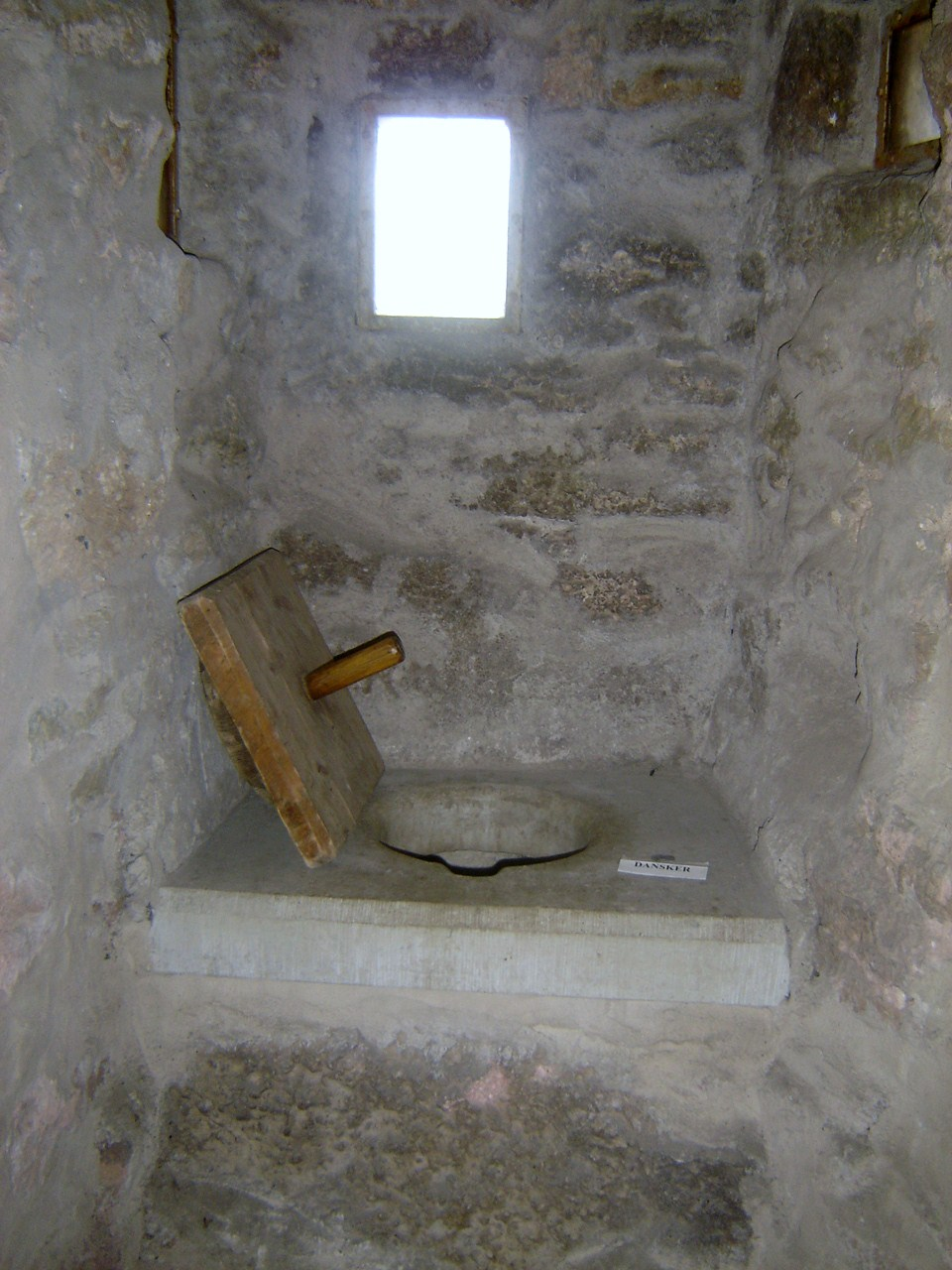
... and interior

The term garderobe is also used to refer to a medieval or Renaissance toilet or a close stool. It was one among many euphemisms used back then for toilets, such as 'privy chamber' or simply 'privy', 'draught', 'gong', 'siege-house', 'neccessarium', and 'Golden Tower'. In a medieval castle, a garderobe was usually a simple hole discharging to the outside into a cesspit (akin to a pit latrine) or the moat (like a fish pond toilet), depending on the structure of the building. Such toilets were often placed inside a small chamber, leading by association to the use of the term garderobe to describe the rooms. Many can still be seen in Norman and medieval castles and fortifications, for example at Bürresheim Castle in Germany, where three garderobes are still visible. Castle garderobes typically projected out of the wall, supported by corbels, allowing for the waste to fall into the moat or, more seldomly, into a river. Some castle garderobes hung over a cliff face or had shafts leading down to the courtyard or bailey. They became obsolete with the introduction of indoor plumbing.

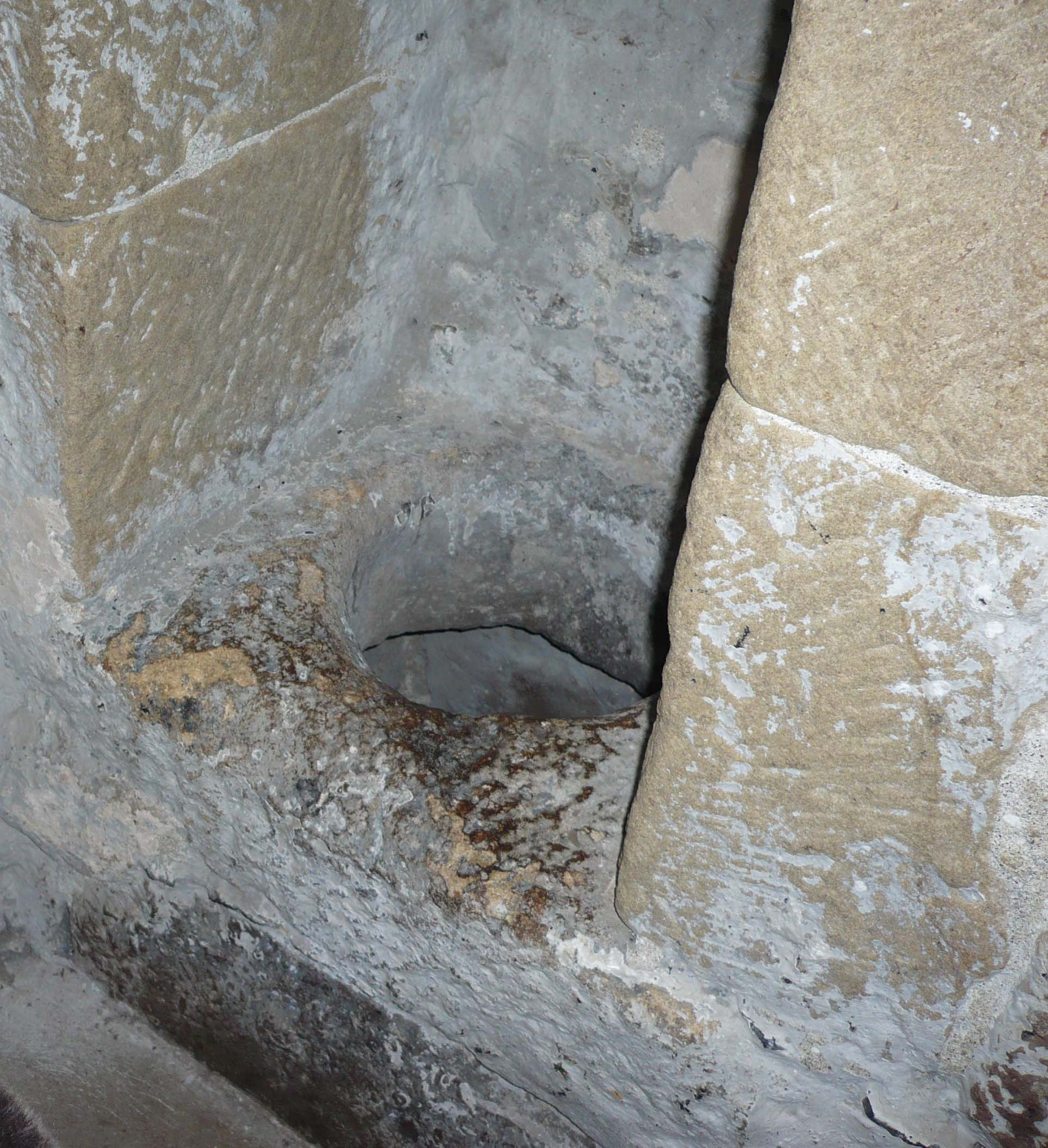
Interior of a late 13th-century garderobe at Chirk Castle in Wales.

== Toilet used as wardrobe ==
Historian Dan Snow indicates that the word garderobe is thought to originate in the habit of hanging one's clothes in the toilet shaft, as the ammonia—a byproduct of excretion—would kill the fleas hidden in the fabric.

== Other languages ==
In European public places, a garderobe denotes a cloakroom, wardrobe, alcove, or armoire used to temporarily store the coats and other possessions of visitors. In Danish, Dutch, Estonian, German, Norwegian, Polish, Russian, Spanish, Swedish and Ukrainian, the word can mean a cloakroom. In Latvian, it means "checkroom".

== See also ==
- Bretèche, a small balcony in a medieval fortress
- Dansker, a German term for a castle toilet in a tower over a watercourse
