= Kwidzyn Castle =

Castle in Poland

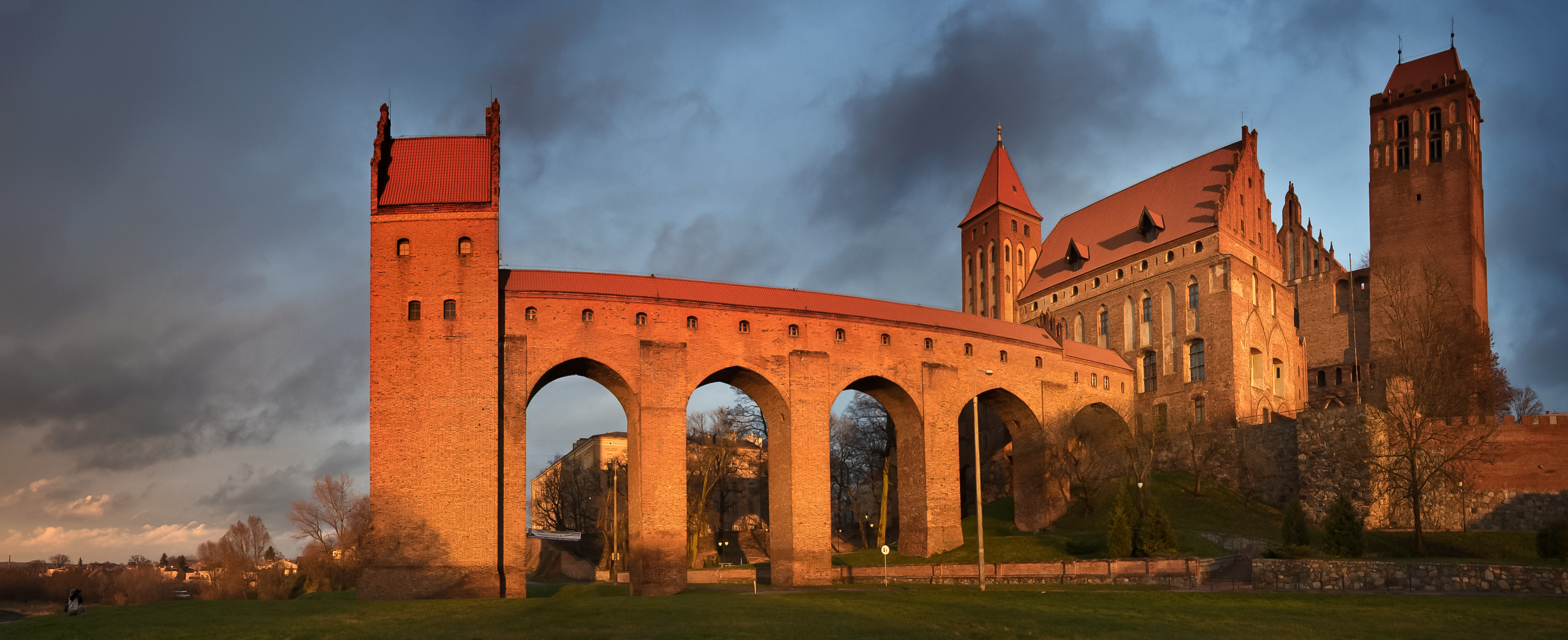
- Kwidzyn Castle

- Location of the Kwidzyn Castle in Poland
- 53°44′10″N 18°55′16″E
- Location: Kwidzyn, Pomeranian Voivodeship, Poland

History
- Built: 1233
- Rebuilt: 1855–1875

Site notes
- Architectural style: Gothic

Historic Monument of Poland
- Designated: 2018-04-20
- Part of: Kwidzyn – cathedral and castle complex
- Reference no.: Dz. U. z 2018 r. poz. 930

Kwidzyn Castle (German: Marienwerder) is a large brick Gothic castle in the town of Kwidzyn, Poland. The castle is modeled on the Gothic castles of the Teutonic Knights'.

== Description ==
The castle is located by Gdańska Street (Ulica Gdańska in Polish) in Kwidzyn. The castle was used as a chapter house for the Pomesanians, who built it at the beginning of the 14th century, in a square formation with a courtyard and square keeps in the corners of the castle's square formation, and a dansker supported by five arcades. King Władysław II Jagiełło took over the castle, while heading battles against the Teutonic Knights in 1410. The Second Peace of Toruń ceded the castle back to the Teutonic Knights.

During the 17th century Deluge campaigns, the Swedes partially destroyed the castle. After the First Partition of Poland until World War II, a court was located in the castle. In the 18th century, the castle was dismantled and transformed into offices and a school. This transformation was halted by Frederick William IV in 1854, from which time the restoration of the castle was made.

Currently, the preserved north-western and western wing houses the Branch of the Castle Museum in Malbork (Oddział Muzeum Zamkowego w Malborku in Polish). The largest dansker and a well with a porch have also been preserved.

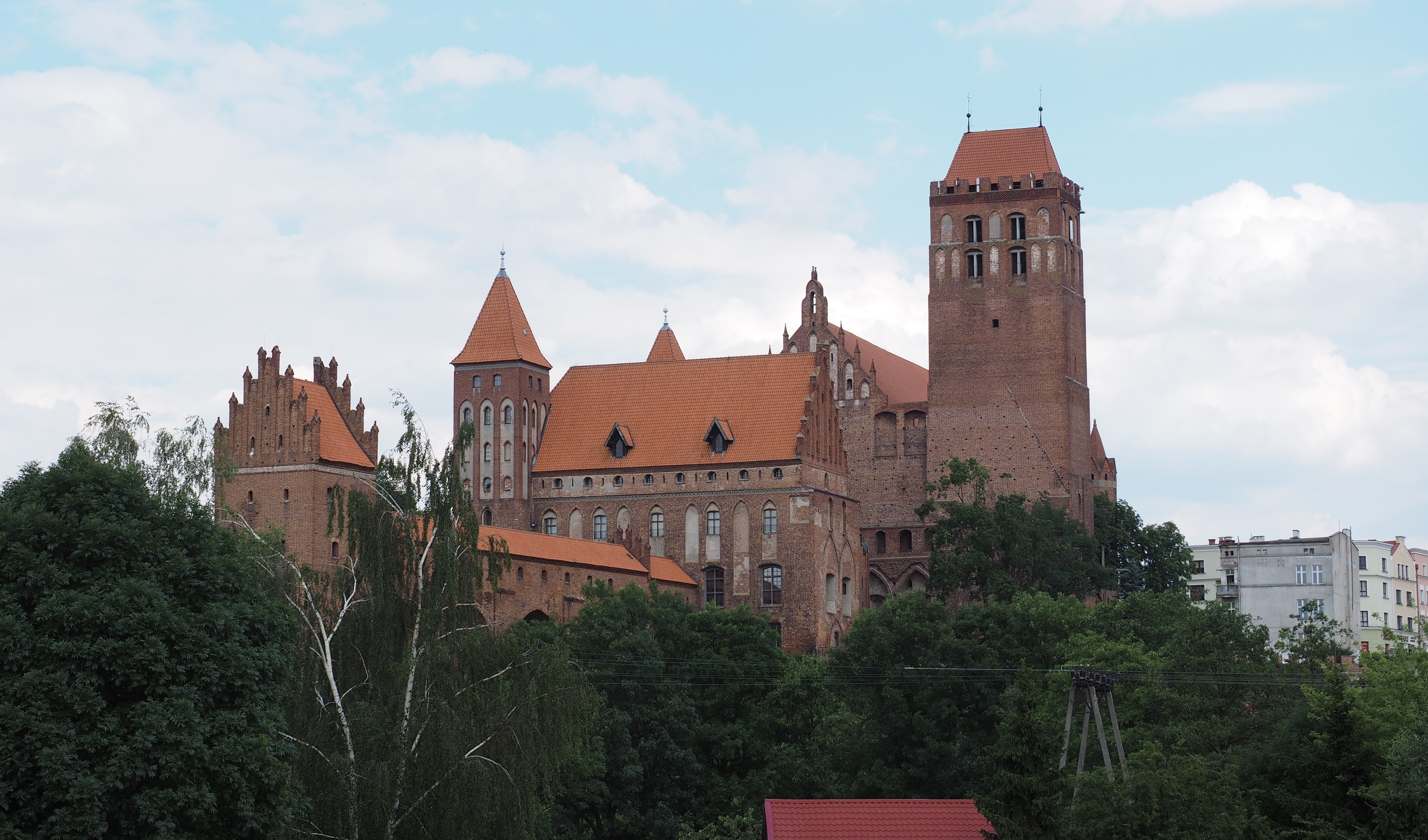

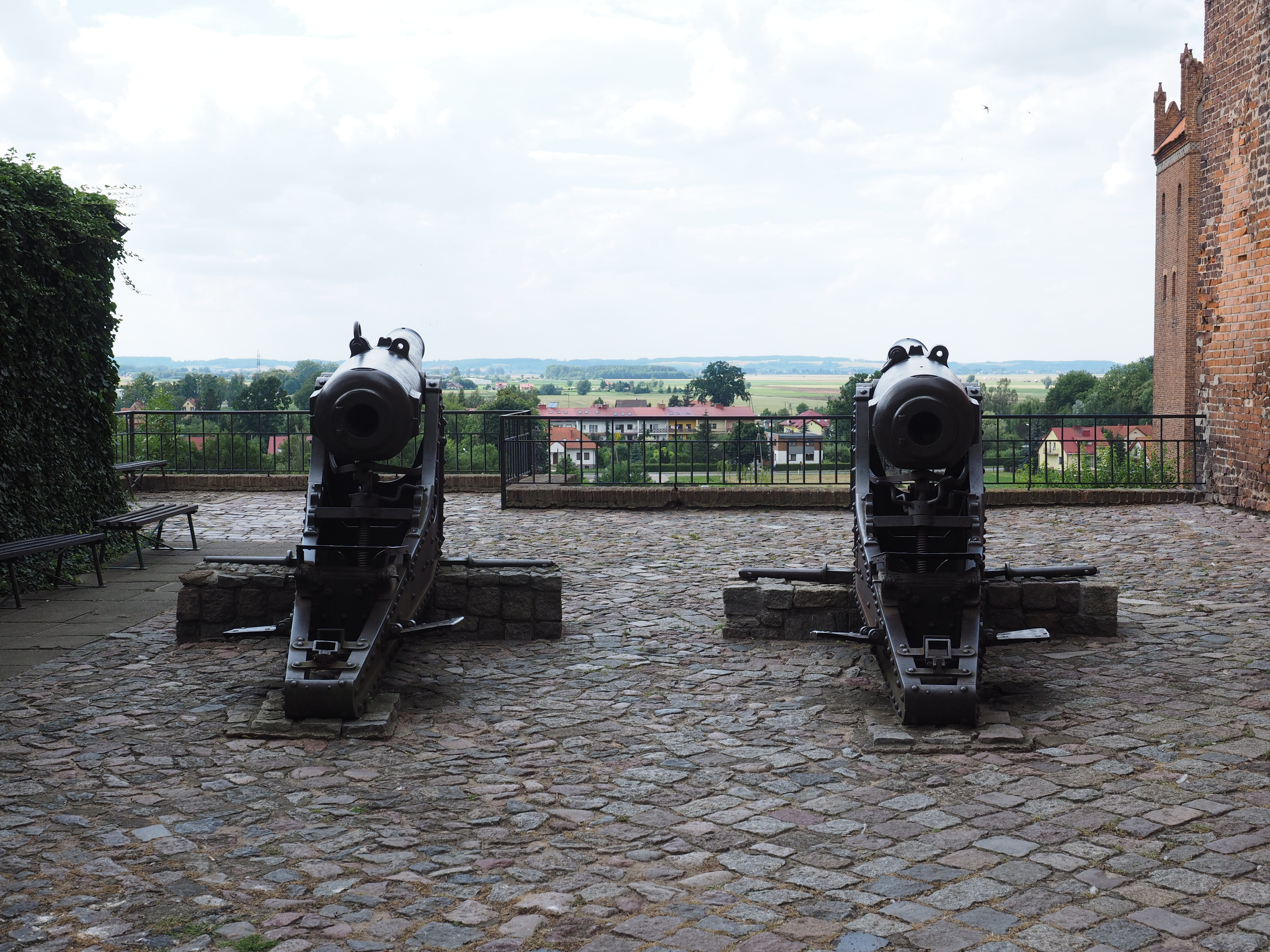

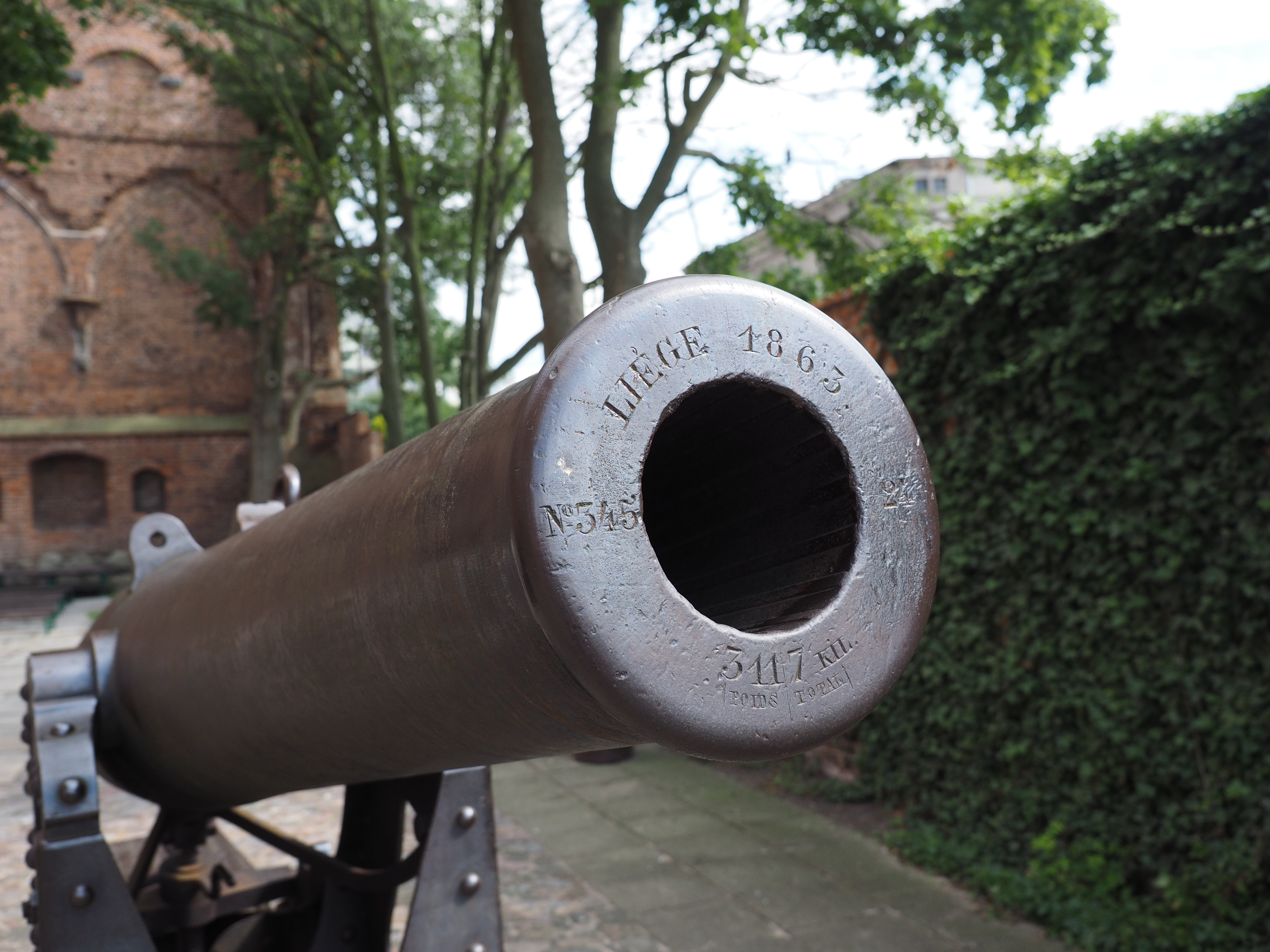

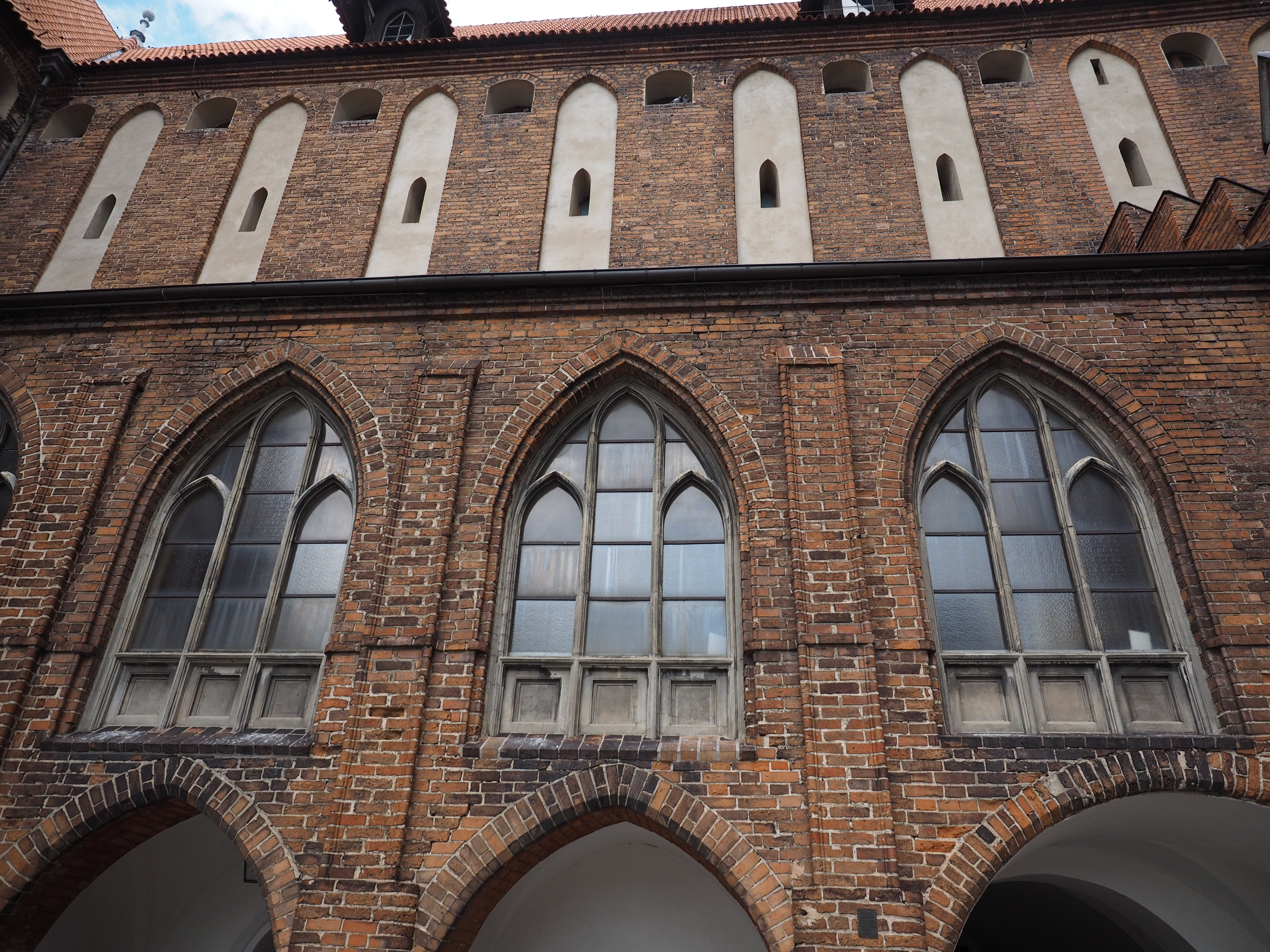

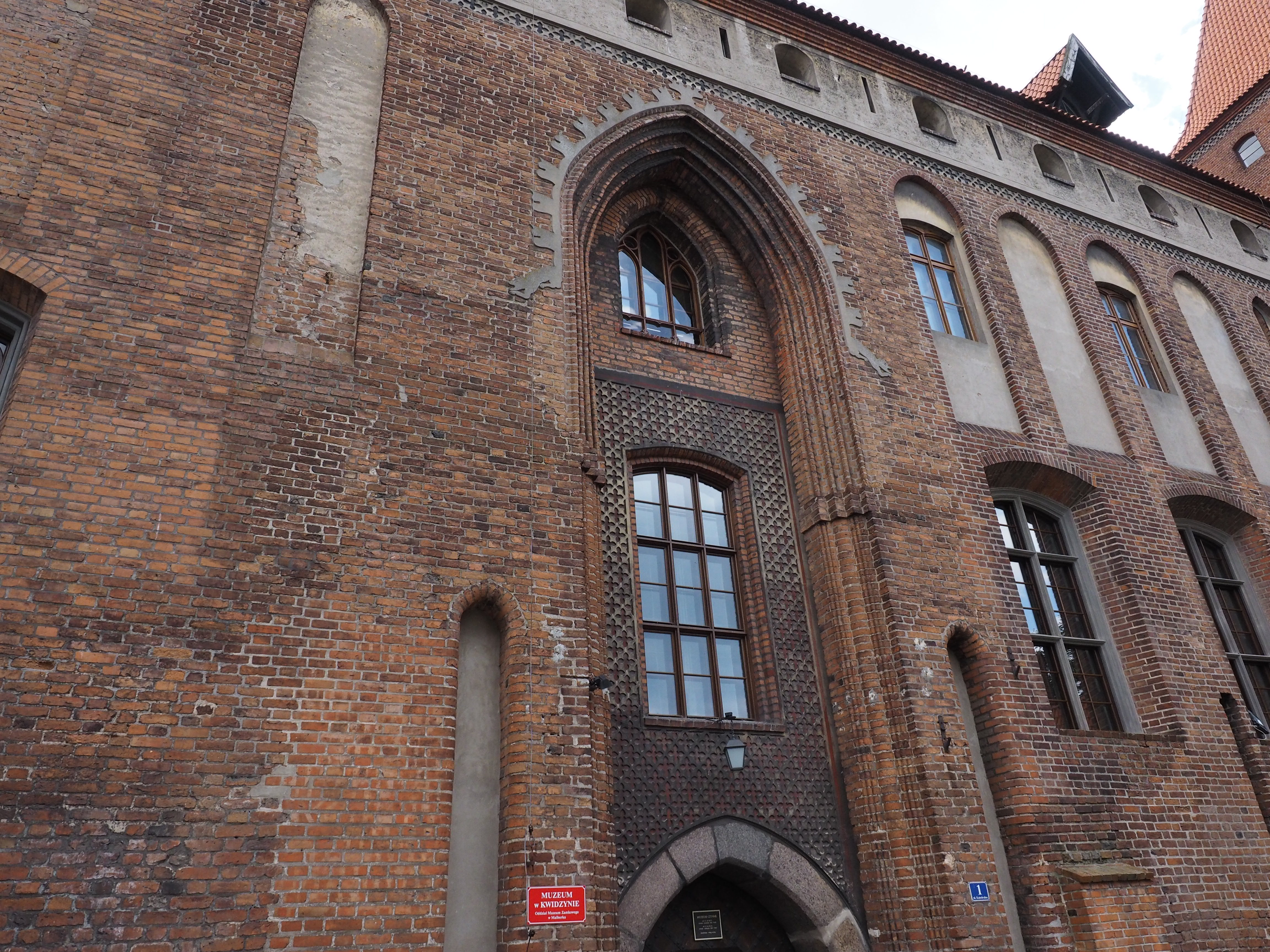

== See also ==
- Malbork Castle
- Sztum Castle
- Castles in Poland
- List of tallest structures built before the 20th century
