= Mikołaj Wulkowski =

Voivode of the Pomeranian Voivodeship

Coat of arms

Mikołaj Wulkowski (died 1509) was the voivode of the Pomeranian Voivodeship until his death in 1509. He had ties to Nicholas Copernicus through Copernicus' uncle, Lucas Watzenrode, the bishop of Warmia. Wulkowski's family claimed the Chomąto arms and owned the medieval village of Wulkow, near modern Tczew.

== Biography ==
Prior to becoming voivode, Wulkowski was listed as the standard-bearer of Gdańsk. In 1485, as voivode of Pomerania, Wulkowski participated in a series of assemblies to determine whether to send troops to Lviv amid Ottoman threats. According to his correspondence, plague disrupted assemblies of the Royal Prussian estates in the 1490s.
