= Leonia Nastał =

Polish religious sister

Venerable Leonia Nastał
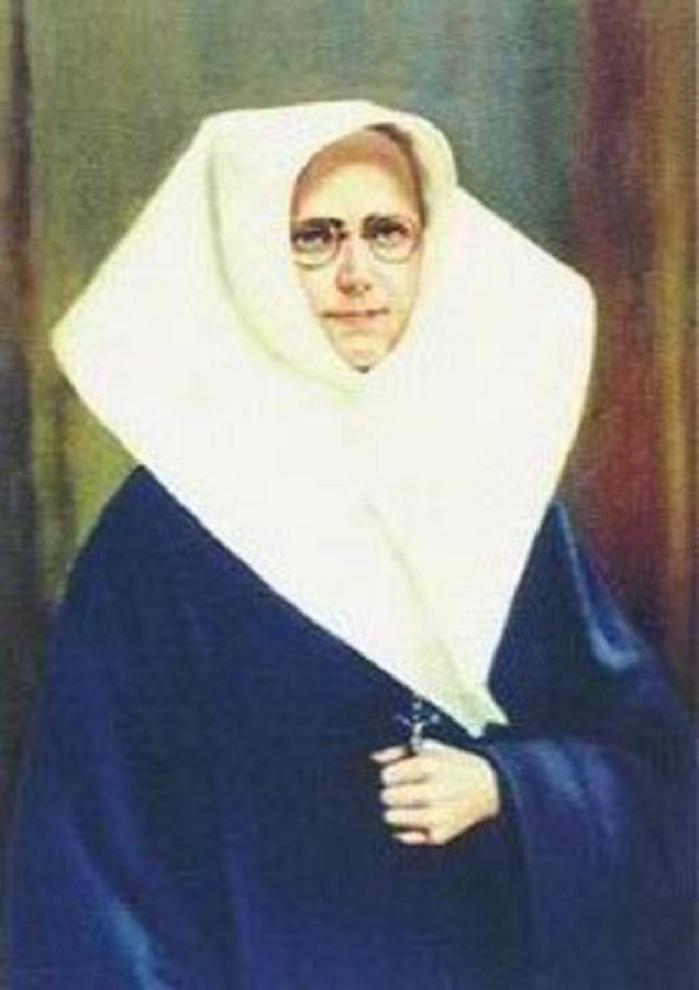
- Born: November 8, 1903; Stara Wieś
- Died: Stara Wieś

Leonia Nastał (born Maria Nastał; 8 November 1903 – 10 January 1940) was a Polish religious sister from the Congregation of the Sisters Handmaids of the Blessed Virgin Mary Immaculate, a mystic, religious writer, Venerable of the Catholic Church, and advocate of the idea of mystical spiritual infancy. She entered the Congregation of the Sisters Handmaids of the Blessed Virgin Mary Immaculate in Stara Wieś in 1925 at the age of 22. In the 1930s, she claimed to have mystical revelations of Jesus Christ, during which she was shown a way of life based on humility and unlimited trust in God. In her final years, afflicted by illness, she spent time receiving treatment in Szczawnica. She died in January 1940 in Stara Wieś, regarded for her holiness.

== Early life ==
=== Youth ===
Maria Nastał was born in Stara Wieś, a village near the town of Brzozów in the Dynowskie Foothills in the Outer Subcarpathia. Her parents, Franciszek Nastał (born 1879) and Katarzyna née Jopów, were smallholding peasants. Church records indicate that Maria's father was an unbalanced man prone to drinking and quarreling. (Note: The poverty prevailing in the countryside and illiteracy had a demoralizing effect on people in many cases. There were several taverns in every village. The money earned by the peasants was very often spent on drink. Therefore, we will not be surprised by the remarks made in the church records that Franciszek Nastał was an unbalanced man prone to quarrels, fights, and drunkenness. Serious reservations are also expressed there regarding his behavior. Perhaps these negative traits were somewhat balanced by his resourcefulness in life, entrepreneurship, and diligence, and over time, they also underwent serious moderation (Lipian (1983, p. 230)).) He ruled the family with an iron fist and demanded absolute obedience. Her mother, on the other hand, was balanced, cheerful, and very devout; Maria learned about religiosity from her through shared prayers and reading religious books. Maria Nastał had an older sister, Stefania, and a younger brother, Stanisław. Two other siblings died in childhood. Due to the poverty prevailing in Galicia, her father emigrated to America for work for 18 years in the early 20th century. The family made a living from a small farm, odd jobs for others, and money sent by the father.

She received the sacrament of baptism on 9 November 1903. The godparents were Jan Cichoń and Anna Leń. She received her First Holy Communion on 15 June 1911, and on November 18 of the same year, she was confirmed by Bishop Karol Fischer. In Maria's hometown, there are still Jesuit monasteries and convents of the Handmaids of the Blessed Virgin Mary Immaculate. Maria attended the village primary school from 1910 to 1916. At home, she helped with cattle herding.

The outbreak of World War I worsened the family's already difficult financial situation and led to a break in contact with her father. Maria Nastał's mother, Katarzyna, seeing her younger daughter's abilities, did not want her to interrupt her education and sent her for private English lessons in Brzozów. When the front moved away from the family's area, and her father sent a written permission, Maria continued her education at the 6-grade Queen Jadwiga Public School in Brzozów from 1917 to 1919 and completed the fifth and sixth grades. In 1919, she applied to join the Congregation of the Sisters Handmaids of the Blessed Virgin Mary Immaculate but was not accepted due to her father's opposition.

During her youth, the Jesuit priests leading the parish had a significant influence on her, especially Father Kutyba, who was her confessor and taught her about sacrificial love for Jesus Christ and striving for perfection. Maria Nastał inherited a deeply religious foundation from her mother through conversations about God, reading the Bible together, and prayer. She received Holy Communion every day. The conviction of her religious vocation appeared very early, at the age of only three. At the age of 18, she secretly burned the name of Jesus on her chest with a hot nail, which became infected. Her father Franciszek, who returned from America in 1921, vehemently opposed her desire to enter the convent, but due to his daughter's act with the nail, he stopped trying to change her decision, although he did not reconcile with it. On 8 November 1921, Maria Nastał left her family home and went to the Benedictine convent in Staniątki to study at the local teacher training college, but she did not feel comfortable there. After the school year ended, she went home for vacation and stayed there. In 1923, her older sister got married, but her brother was born, so she was not the only heir to her parents' farm.

=== Religious life ===
Finally, Franciszek Nastał announced to his daughter that he did not want to see her in his house, and after 8 years of efforts, Maria entered the Congregation of the Sisters Handmaids of the Blessed Virgin Mary Immaculate, a religious order founded by Father Edmund Bojanowski, on 31 December 1925. She first underwent a 3-month postulant; she attended Holy Masses, participated in spiritual exercises, and prayed together with the sisters. On 18 April 1926, the ceremony of investiture took place; Maria Nastał received the name Leonia (Note: Initially Leona, later changed to Leonia.) and henceforth wore a habit and veil. Then Leonia Nastał began a 2-year novitiate, under the guidance of Sister Zofia Szmyd. She was well-liked by other novices. She knew how to play the pump organ and sometimes replaced the organist.

In July 1927, after completing her first canonical year of novitiate, she went to Vyzhniany near Lviv for a mission, where she was to become more acquainted with the works of the Congregation and the duties of her vocation, and also to discern whether she would be capable of receiving religious vows. In Wyżniany, Sister Leonia took care of orphans from the local preschool. After three months, she was assigned for three weeks to Verkhnyaya Belka as an organist. Then, on the orders of her superiors, in November 1927, Sister Leonia went to Przemyśl to continue her education. From there, she returned to the motherhouse of the congregation to prepare for her three-year vows of poverty, chastity, and obedience, which she took there on 23 April 1928. Her immediate family, except for her father, attended the ceremony.

After taking her vows, she remained in Stara Wieś and for 9 months studied English in preparation to go to the United States, where the Congregation had had missions since 1926, and work for the American-Polish community. However, she did not get the visa from the American consulate, so she did not leave. In November 1928, she went to Przemyśl to continue her studies, and she lived there until December 1932. On 20 April 1931, after completing her first profession, she renewed her religious vows for the second three-year period in Stara Wieś. On 30 November 1932, she externally passed the maturity exam at the X Male State Humanistic Gymnasium in Lviv.

In December 1932, she went to Stara Wieś and for several weeks gave history lectures to novices, and in January 1933, she went to Poznań, where she took care of sisters participating in a 6-week pedagogical course. She also taught them Polish and German there. At that time, due to poor living conditions, she experienced the first symptoms of tuberculosis, which was a fatal disease at that time. In March 1933, she went to a congregation facility in Łódź and helped in educational work at the orphanage. On 13 April 1934, Sister Leonia made her perpetual profession to Mother General Eleonora Jankiewicz, in the presence of a chaplain and her parents. In September 1934, Father Kazimierz Schmelzer became her spiritual director. With his permission, she began to write down her spiritual experiences in September 1935. From 1935 to 1937, she stayed in Poznań, where she managed the convent and took care of the sisters who were studying, totaling 74. Her mystical experiences during her time in Poznań are documented in her writings.

==== Stay in Szczawnica and death ====
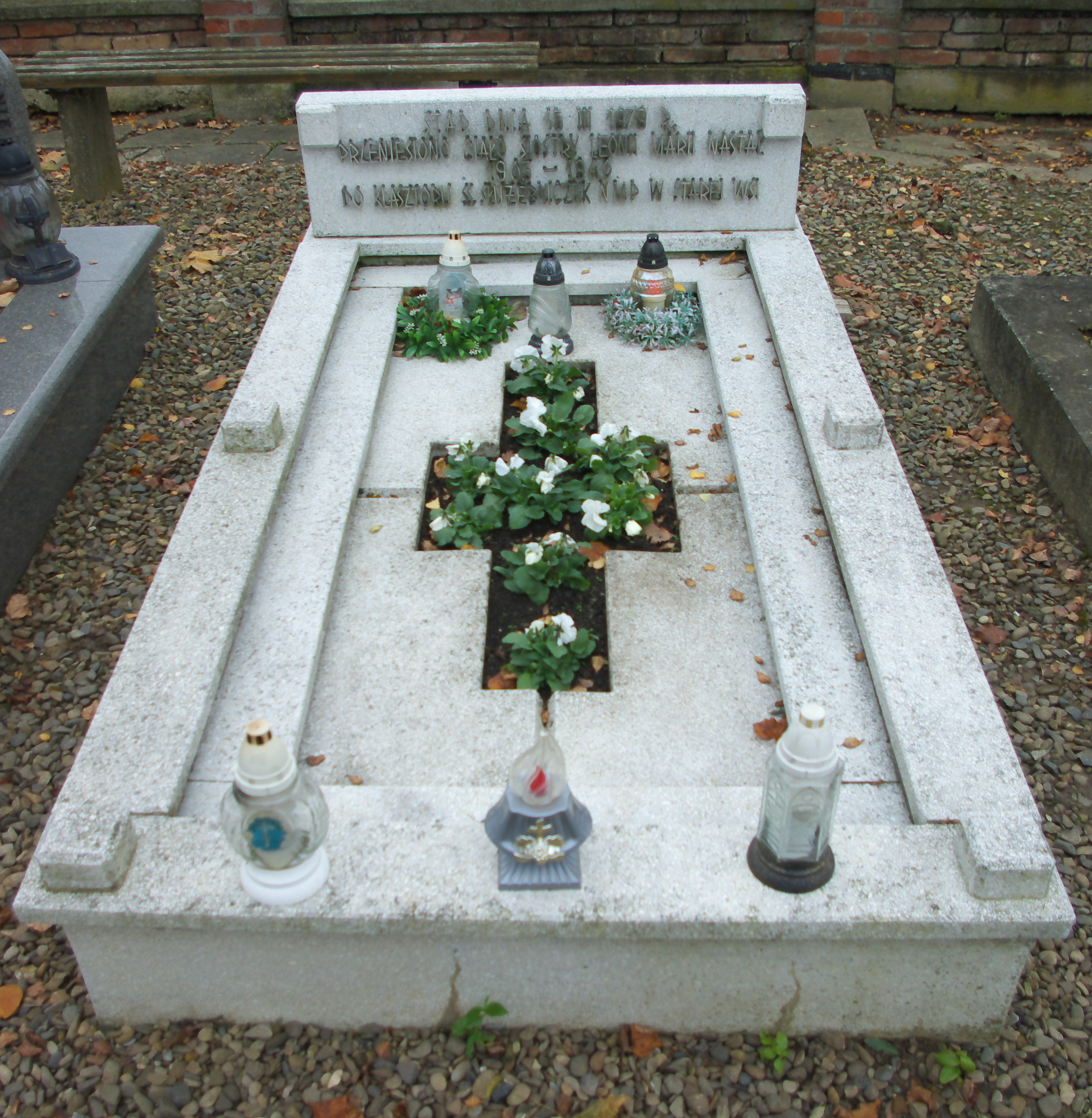
The original tombstone of Sister Nastał preserved in the Stara Wieś cemetery

In the second half of the fourth decade of the 20th century, her health began to deteriorate. After being diagnosed with infiltrations and tuberculosis lesions in her lungs, she went for treatment to Szczawnica on 29 October 1937. The illness aroused her joy and hope for a swift reunion with Jesus Christ. While undergoing treatment, Sister Leonia devoted herself primarily to literary work, but also served as a sacristan in the convent chapel, helped the sisters with daily tasks, and corresponded with her superior. She also assisted during Holy Mass. Her health condition continued to worsen, and the disease attacked her digestive tract. In December 1939, sensing her impending death, Sister Leonia, with the consent of the Mother Superior, moved from Szczawnica to Stara Wieś. In mid-December, at the direction of the Mother Superior General, she began writing her autobiography, which she completed on 2 January 1940.

She died around 4:30 pm on 10 January 1940, in her hometown. She was buried in the local cemetery on January 13. In 1979, her remains were exhumed and placed in the crypt of the congregation's motherhouse in Stara Wieś.

== Beatification process ==
In 1962, the Congregation of the Handmaids began efforts to beatify Sister Leonia. In December 1969, Bishop Ignacy Tokarczuk of Przemyśl submitted a votum to the Holy See to initiate the cognitional process. On 9 January 1976, the Dicastery for the Causes of Saints announced the decree Nihil obstat, allowing the process to begin in the diocese, which commenced on 8 December 1976. After the conclusion of the cognitional process on 15 September 1980, the documents were sent to the Holy See on 31 October 1980. On 13 March 1998, the Dicastery for the Causes of Saints issued a decree validating the cognitional process. In late June and July 2006, the drafting of the document Positio concerning the venerable Leonia Nastał was completed and submitted to the Secretariat of the Dicastery for the Causes of Saints in Rome. On 2 December 2016, the Dicastery for the Causes of Saints, at the direction of Pope Francis, published a decree on the heroic virtues of Sister Leonia. Henceforth, she holds the title of the Venerable.

== Spirituality ==
While in Poznań, Leonia Nastał experienced mystical encounters in which Jesus Christ allegedly revealed to her the path to holiness based on humility and unlimited trust in God. Initially, Leonia Nastał drew inspiration from St. Thérèse of Lisieux and her spiritual childhood. However, later the main idea of her mysticism, as described in the book Uwierzyłam miłości, became what is known as spiritual infancy. It was characterized by humility, awareness of one's own weakness and inability to act without God's help, sincerity, simplicity, gentleness, sweetness, and innocence. In one of her letters, she wrote that, in her opinion, spiritual infancy is the shortest way to heaven. She believed that submitting to God's will as a spiritual infant was more valuable than voluntary martyrdom. She consulted everything in her inner life that the voice of Jesus commanded her with her confessor.

Leonia Nastał reportedly experienced periods of spiritual "dryness" and ecstasies. She would sometimes burst into tears uncontrollably. She voluntarily undertook ascetic practices: she fasted several times a week, used disciplines, slept on wooden planks, and whipped herself. She also mortified herself by enduring humiliations and quarrels from her father in silence, giving up minor pleasures, and refraining from eating favorite dishes. She did this to compensate God for her own imperfections and to obtain grace for others. She considered prayer, which she defined as the soul's being with God, to be the most effective means of sanctification. In her youth, she mainly prayed using the rosary. Every day, she did examination of conscience. She made a private vow to maintain chastity even before entering the convent.

Leonia Nastał exerted a significant influence on the sisters of the Congregation. According to the testimony of Mother Eleonora Jankiewicz, her presence and behavior contributed to raising their level of religious life. The nun's father, although initially categorically opposed to his daughter's vocation, embittered by her decision, did not participate in the ceremony of investiture and vows, but under her influence, he converted and began to attend Mass and receive communion daily.

Among the saints, she particularly revered the Mother of God and Saint Joseph, the two patrons of the Congregation. She was also inspired by St. John of the Cross and Piotr Semenenko. The motto of her life was I Believed in Eternal Love. Her favorite book was The Story of a Soul by St. Thérèse.

According to Cecylian Niezgoda of the Order of Friars Minor Conventual, Leonia Nastał made at least two mistakes in her mystical spiritual life. In a letter to her spiritual director, Father Kazimierz Schmelzer, she wrote: The Lord Jesus will heal Rev. Spiritual Father; he promised me this, and I thanked Him in advance, but Father Schmelzer did not recover. In a letter a month later, she wrote that Jesus promised to heal Father Schmelzer, but he postponed the fulfillment of his promise. In another instance, before the outbreak of World War II in September 1939, she was convinced that the war would not happen. In one of her letters to her spiritual director, she expressed doubts whether she was adding something to what her "inner voice" told her. However, Father Schmelzer was convinced that Leonia Nastał's prayer was a Christian mysticism.

== Literary works ==
Leonia Nastał wrote poems, plays, speeches, stage works, and essays; they were used for educational purposes as well as in various church ceremonies and the educational activities of the Sisters of the Congregation of the Sisters Handmaids of the Most Blessed Virgin Mary Immaculate. She wrote on commission, most often for the sisters or individuals involved in educational work. Her literary work was a source of religious knowledge, addressing issues of moral education as well. In her works, she taught love for one's neighbor, kindness, respect for the elderly and disabled, as well as patriotism and the search for God in nature and in other people. She also wrote for Róża Duchowna, a Lviv magazine dedicated to the rosary brotherhoods.

The writings of Leonia Nastał can be divided into three groups: various educational works in terms of genre, letters, and notes concerning her inner life. The third group of writings includes Notatki rekolekcyjne covering the years 1926–1934, conducted at the request of her confessor, Father Wojciech Trubak; Dziennik duchowny in eight consecutive notebooks covering the years 1934–1939; and Historia powołania, an autobiographical essay written shortly before her death at the request of Mother General Eleonora Jankiewicz. Her literary legacy consists of 1,620 pages of manuscript. Personal notes of Sister Leonia, depicting her inner life, cover 391 pages of manuscript. Letters written to her confessor, fellow sisters, and other individuals cover 505 pages of manuscript.

== Publications and works ==
She is the author of several publications, also translated into other languages:

- Nastał, Leonia Maria; Jaroszewska, Wincenta Jadwiga (1981). Bar, Joachim Roman (ed.). Wybór pism Leonii Marii Nastał i Wincenty Jadwigi Jaroszewskiej (in Polish). Warsaw: Akademia Teologii Katolickiej. OCLC 312548067.
- Nastał, Leonia Maria; Kałdon, Stanisław Maria (1995). Nowenna do Dzieciątka Jezus z rozważaniami Sługi Bożej s. Leonii Nastał – służebniczki: O niemowlęctwie duchowym (in Polish). Kraków: Wydawnictwo Św. Antoniego. ISBN 8385880445. OCLC 749304835.
- Nastał, Leonia Maria (2000). Uwierzyłam Miłości (in Polish) (1 ed.). Stara Wieś: Poligrafia Wyższego Seminarium Duchownego w Rzeszowie. ISBN 8388120182.
- Nastał, Leonia Maria (2003). Różaniec ze Sługą Bożą s. Leonią Nastał: (fragmenty Dziennika) (in Polish). Stara Wieś: Poligrafia Wyższego Seminarium Duchownego w Rzeszowie. ISBN 8389326418. OCLC 749273470.
- Nastał, Leonia Maria (2003). I believed in God's eternal love. Translated by Szymańska, Teofila. Stara Wieś: Poligrafia Wyższego Seminarium Duchownego w Rzeszowie. ISBN 838932637X. OCLC 749568112.
- Nastał, Leonia Maria (2003). Łaski z nieba: uzdrowienie z choroby, dar macierzyństwa, pomoc w nauce i inne otrzymują za wstawiennictwem Sł. Bożej s. Leonii Marii Nastał (in Polish). Poligrafia Wyższego Seminarium Duchownego. ISBN 8389326108. OCLC 749276579.
- Nastał, Leonia Maria; Kałdon, Stanisław Maria (2008). Nabożeństwo do Dzieciątka Jezus: z rozważaniami "O niemowlęctwie duchowym" sługi Bożej s. Leonii Nastał - służebniczki (in Polish). Kraków: Wydawnictwo M. ISBN 9788375950892. OCLC 297850677.
- Nastał, Léonie-Marie (2014). J'ai cru à l'amour: journal spirituel (in French). Hauteville: Ed. du Parvis. ISBN 9782880223663. OCLC 1040997229.
- Nastał, Leonia Maria. Bohaterka (in Polish). Stara Wieś. (Note: The manuscript of this drama is in the archives of the Congregation of the Sisters of the Blessed Virgin Mary in Stara Wieś.)

== See also ==
- List of Catholic saints
- List of saints of Poland
- Intercession of saints

== Bibliography ==
- Lipian, Janina Bernadeta (1983). "Służebnica Boża Leonia Maria Nastał". In Bar, Joachim Roman (ed.). Polscy święci (in Polish). Vol. 2. Warsaw: Akademia Teologii Katolickiej. OCLC 749542052.
- Niezgoda, Cecylian (1984). "Duchowość Służebnicy Bożej Leonii Marii Nastał (1903–1940)". In Bejze, Bohdan (ed.). Chrześcijanie (in Polish). Vol. XII. Warsaw: Akademia Teologii Katolickiej.
- Karaś, Elżbieta Mariola (1980). "S. Maria Leona Nastałówna (1903–1940)". In Bejze, Bohdan (ed.). Chrześcijanie (in Polish). Vol. IV. Warsaw: Akademia Teologii Katolickiej.
- Kluz, Władysław (1993). Chcę być świętą! (in Polish). Stara Wieś: Siostry Służebniczki NMP. OCLC 749717165.
- Kuźnar, Stanisław (1947). Ku szczytom (in Polish). Kraków: Wydawnictwo Apostolstwa Modlitwy Księża Jezuici. OCLC 297641461.
