= List of monuments in Brzozów =

Monuments and memorials in Brzozów, Poland

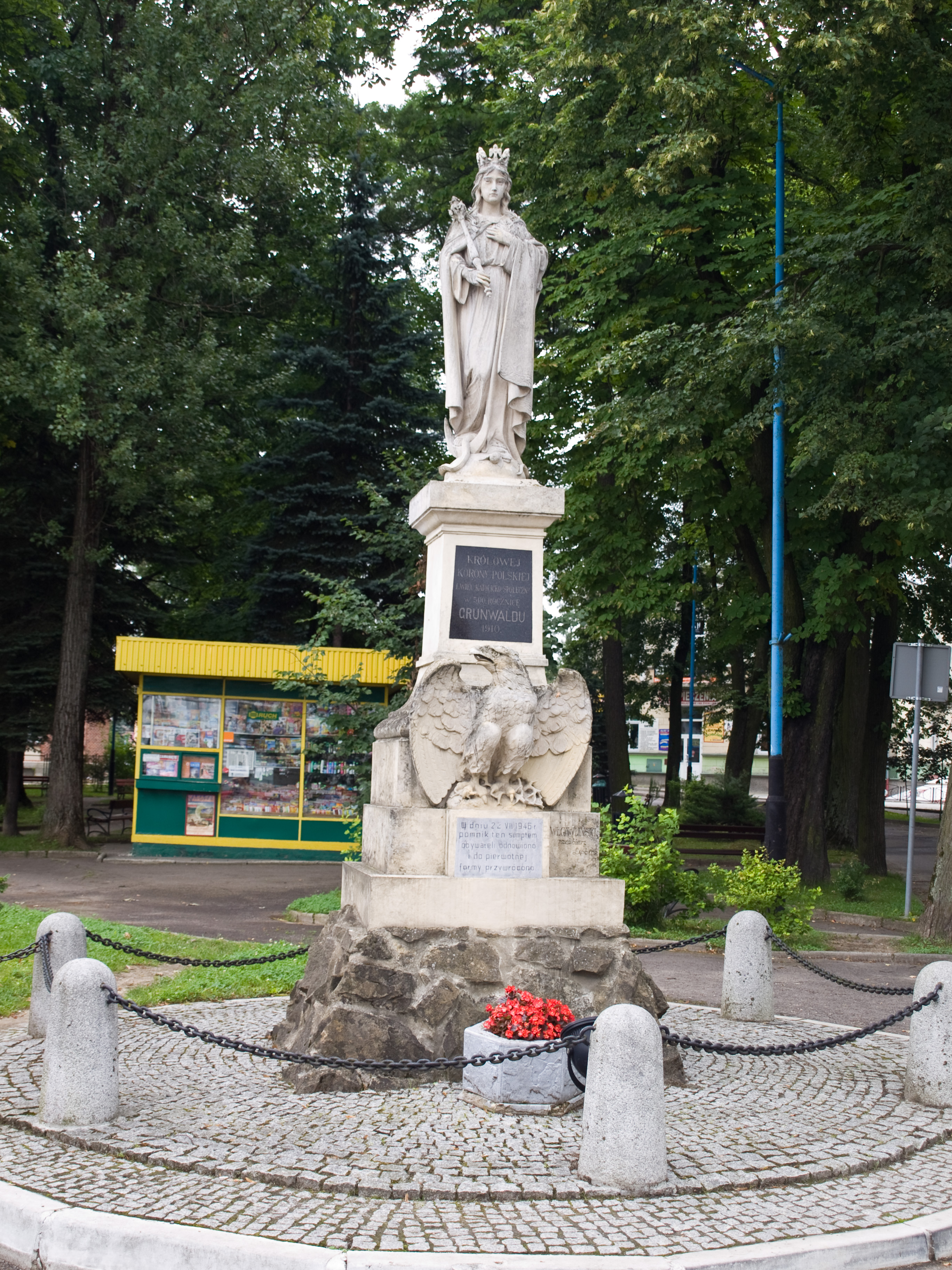
Monument to the 500th anniversary of the Battle of Grunwald

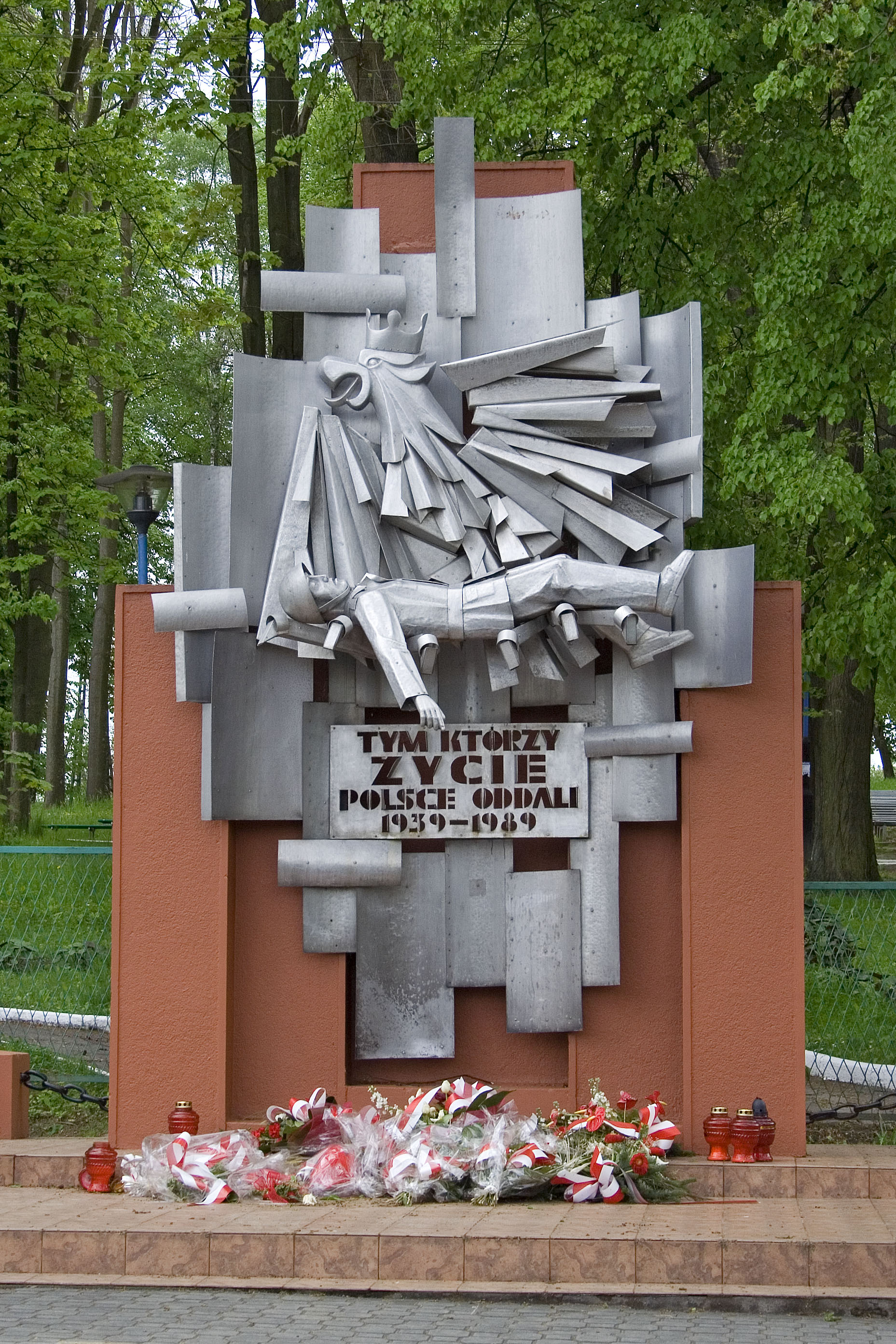
National Remembrance Monument, To Those Who Gave Their Lives for Poland 1939–1989

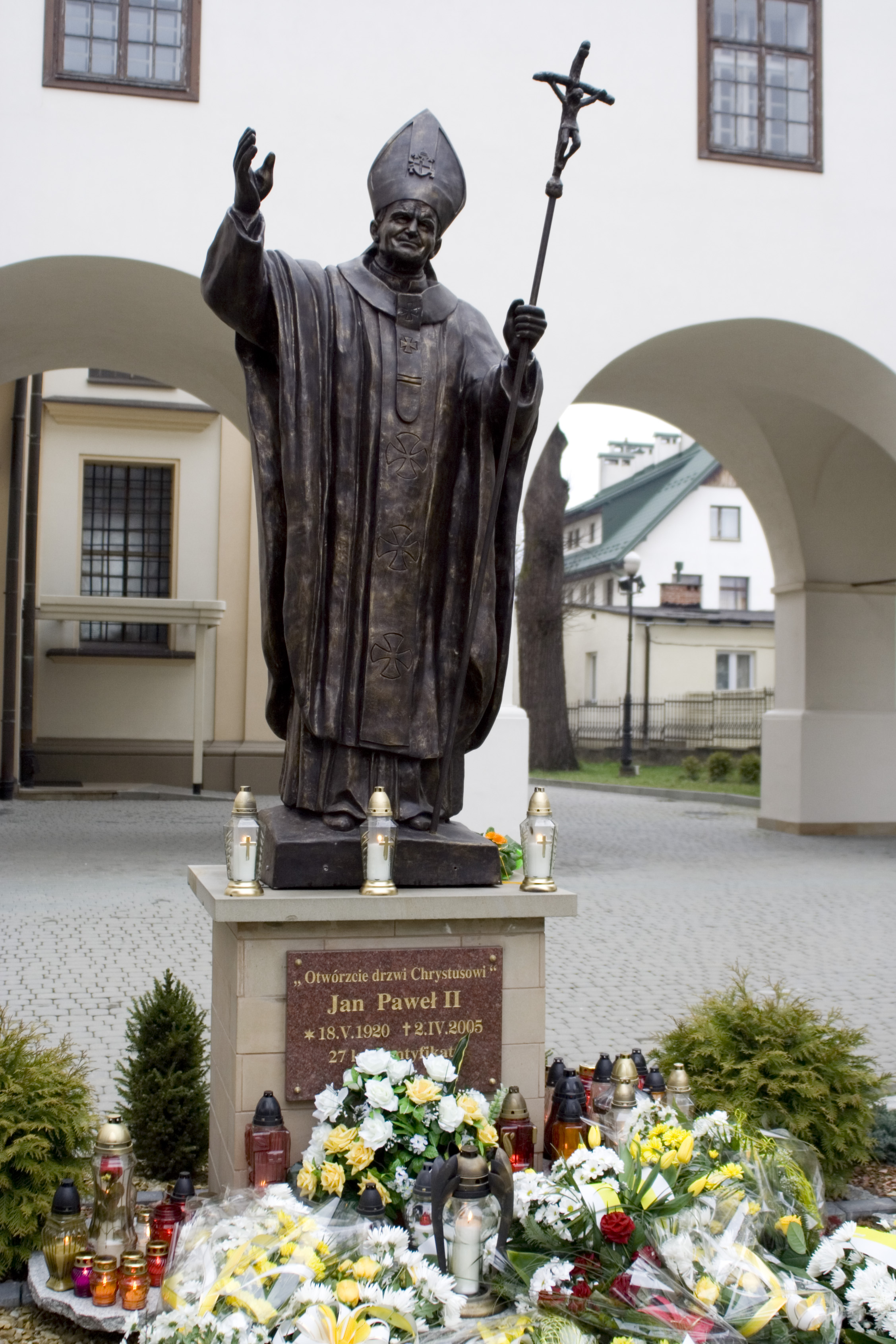
Open the Doors to Christ – 27 years of John Paul II's pontificate

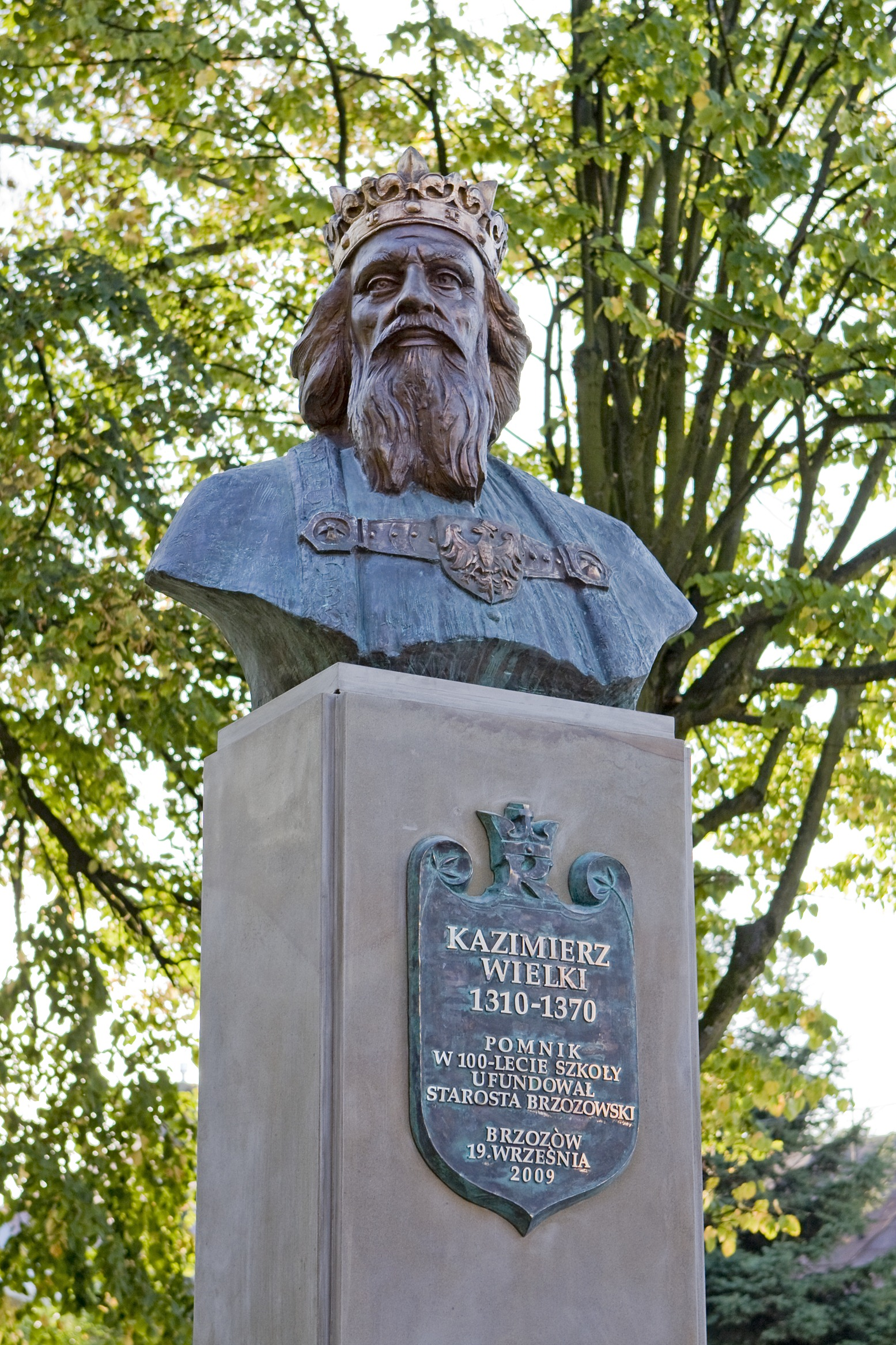
Monument to King Casimir the Great

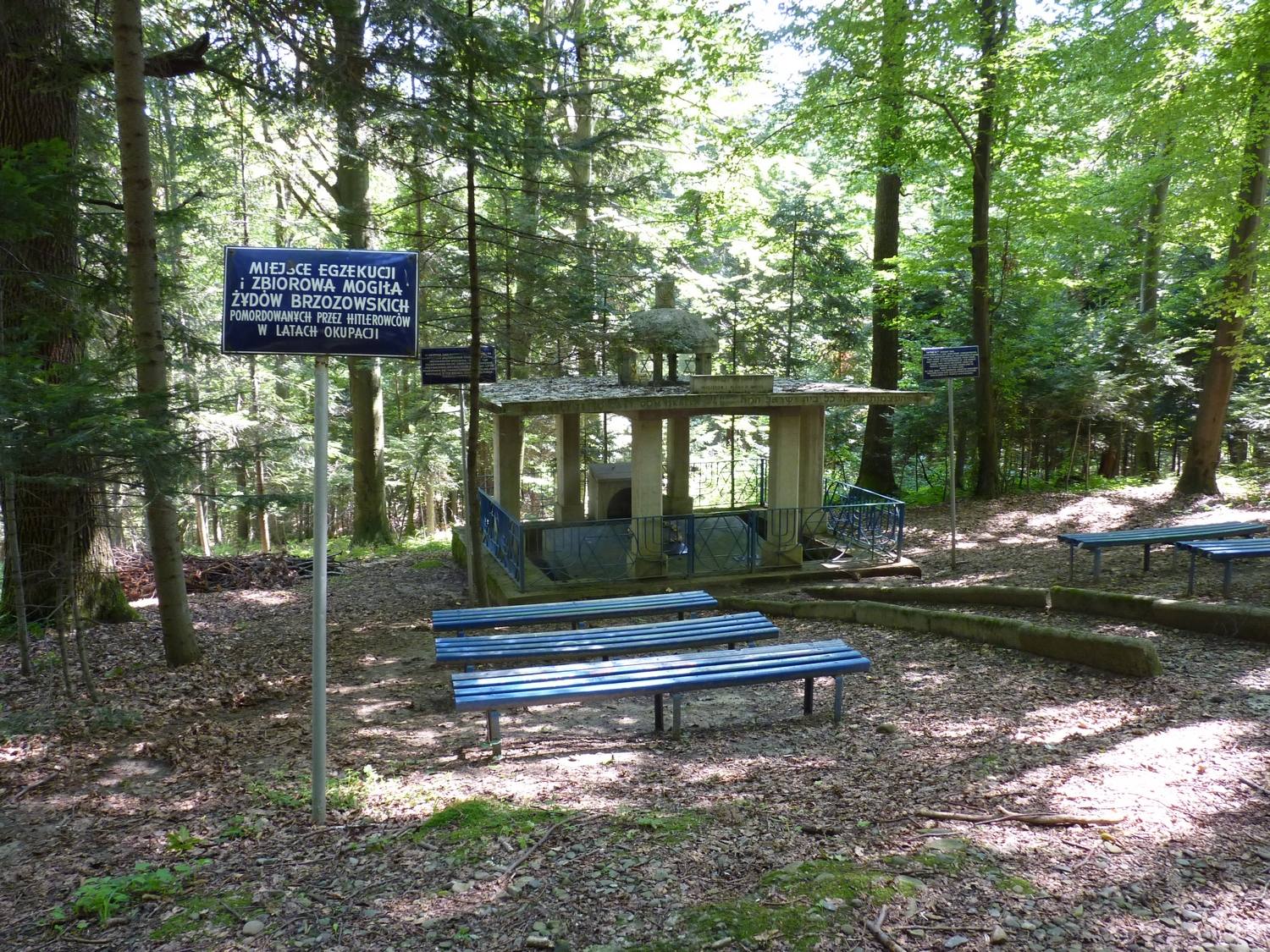
Mausoleum for murdered Jews (Brzozów-Zdrój)

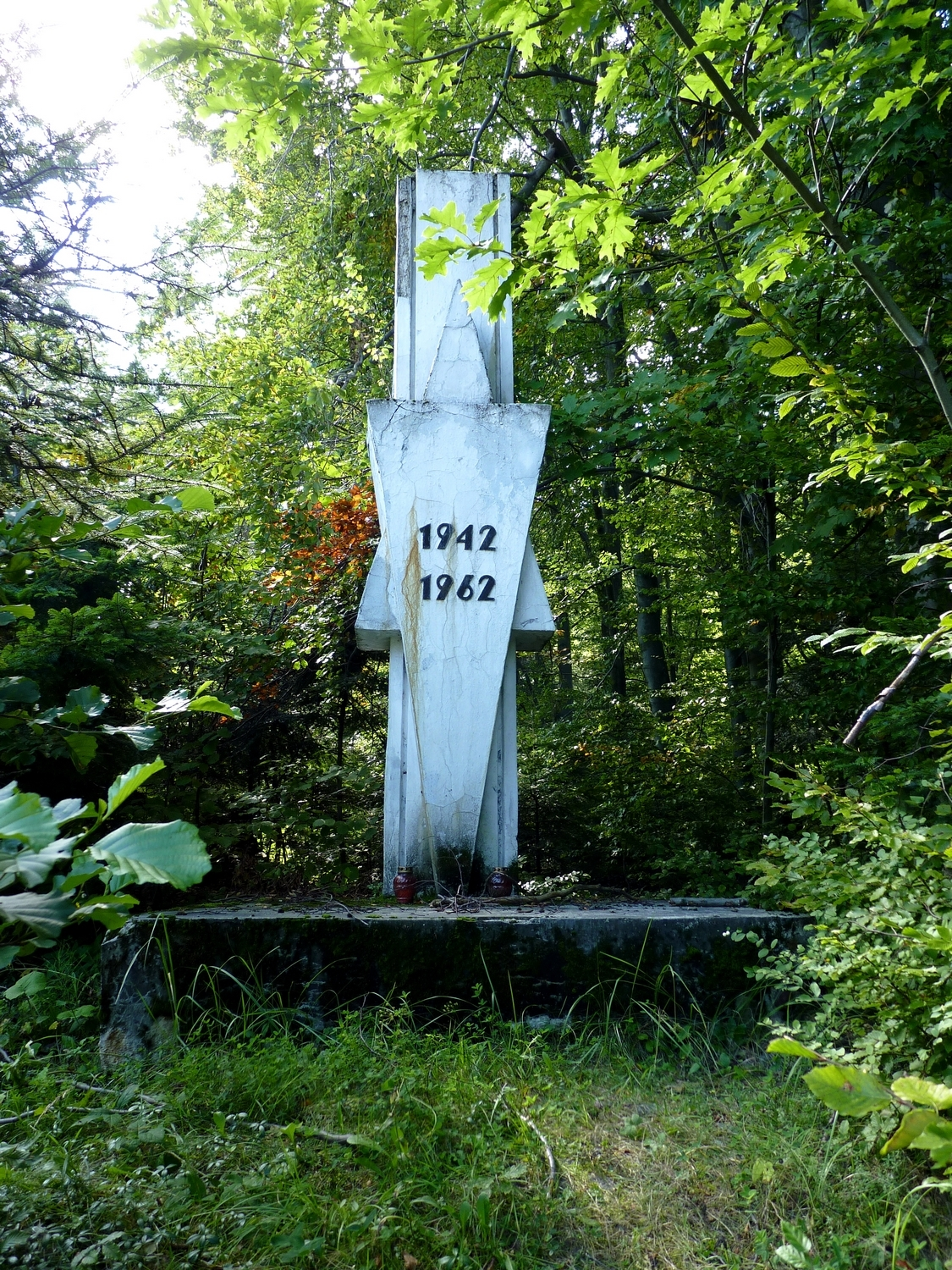
Obelisk commemorating Brzozów Jews

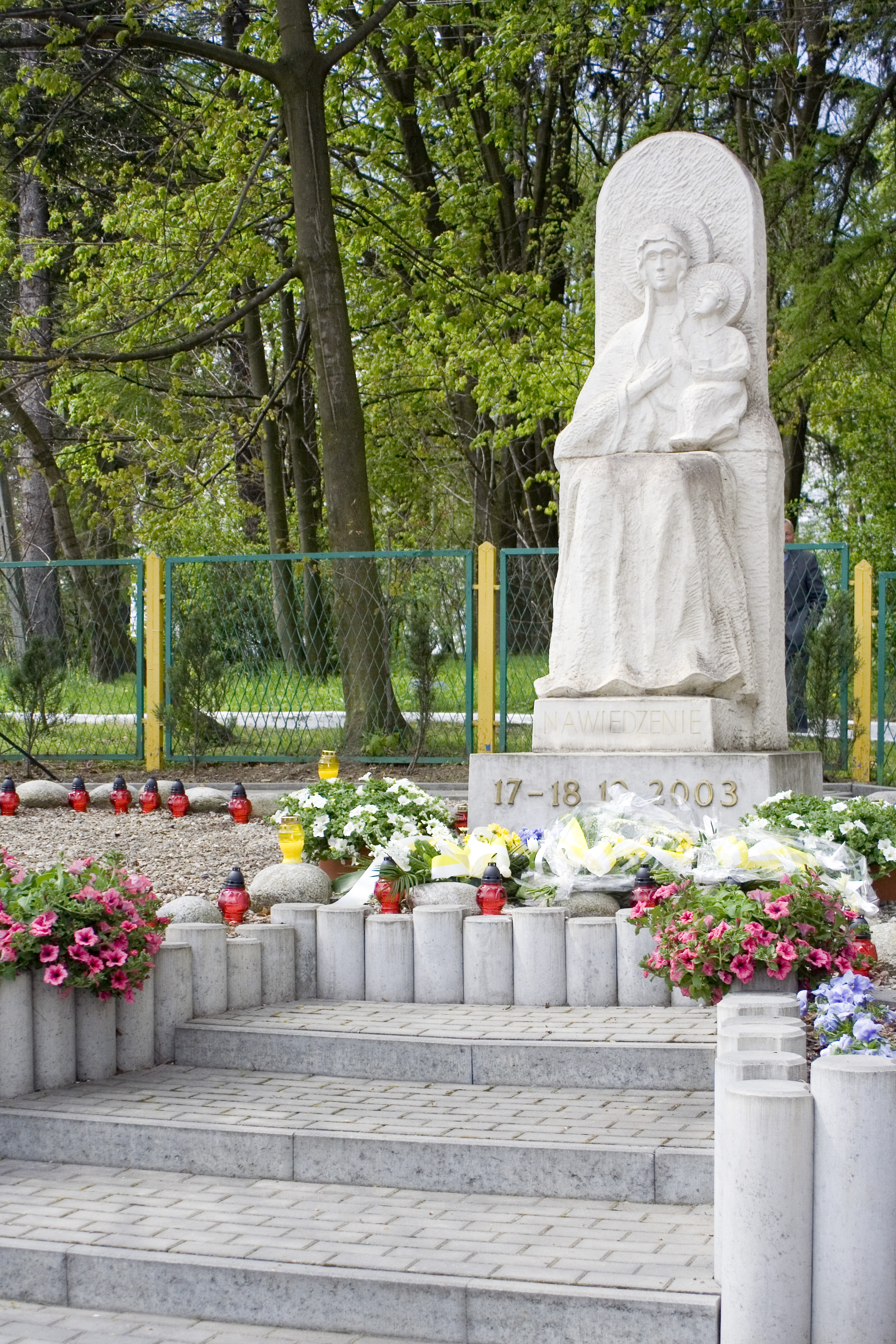
Monument commemorating the visit of a copy of the Black Madonna of Częstochowa icon to Brzozów

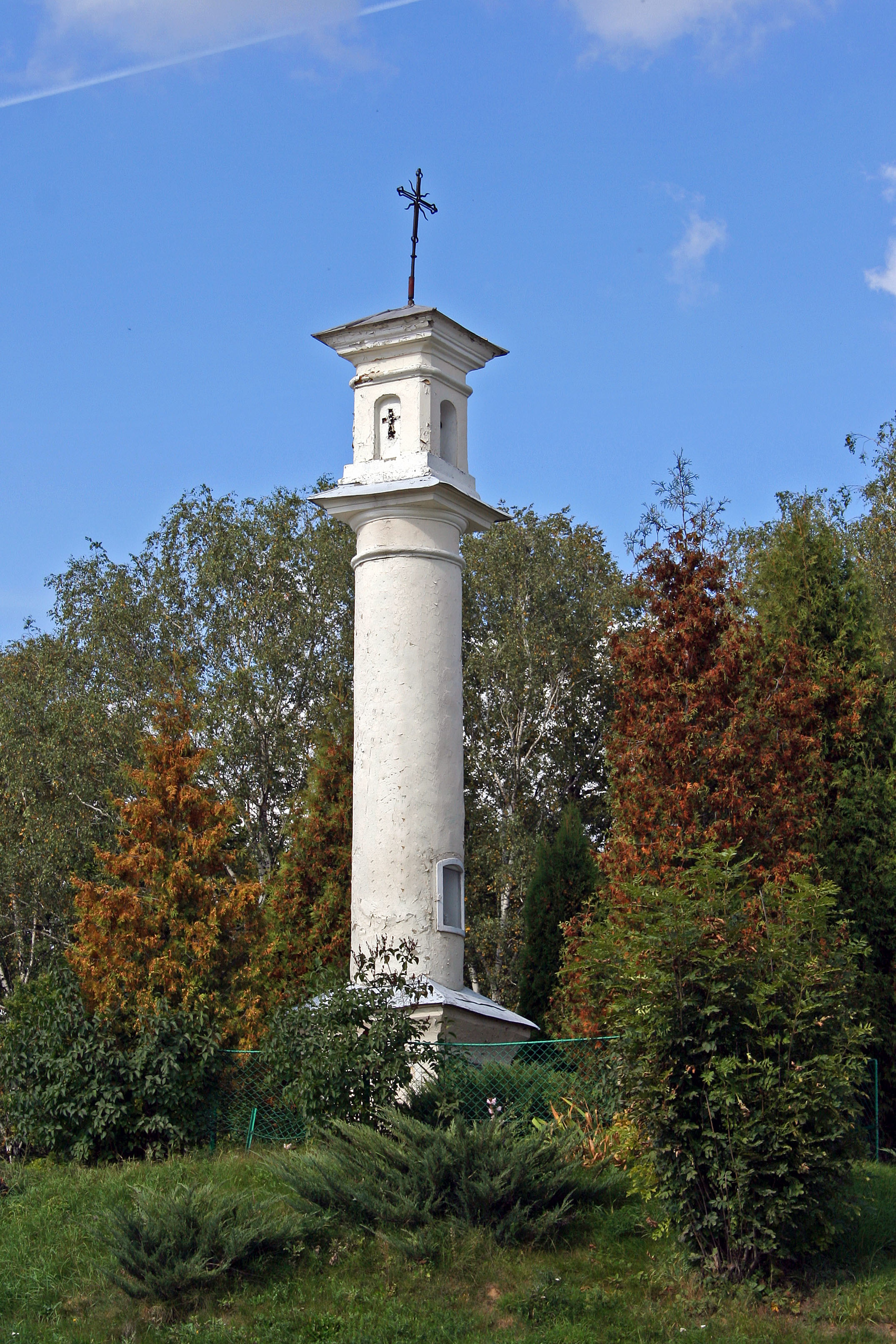
Obelisk on the Bar Confederation's grave

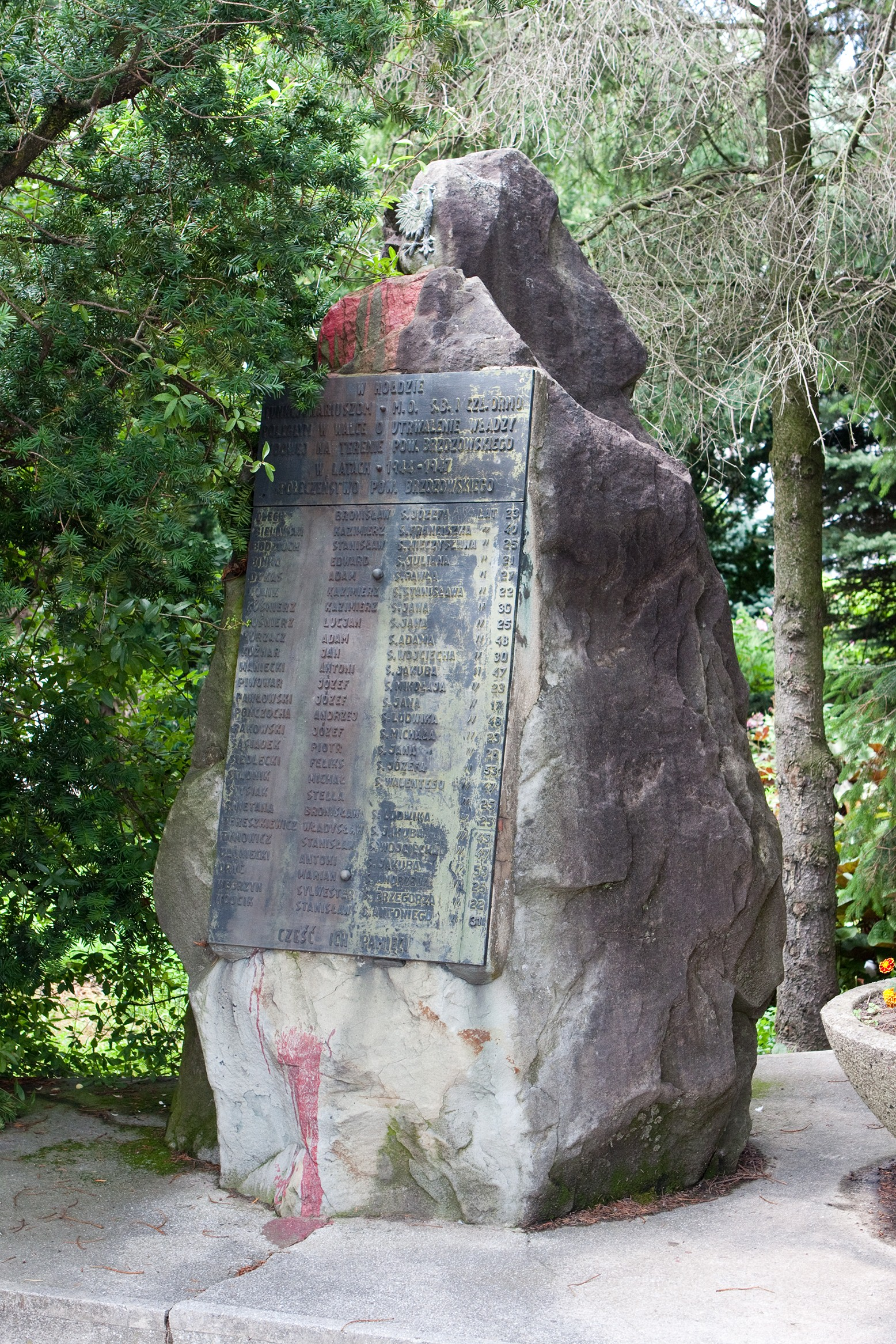
Stone commemorating officers of the Citizens' Militia, Security Service, and ORMO

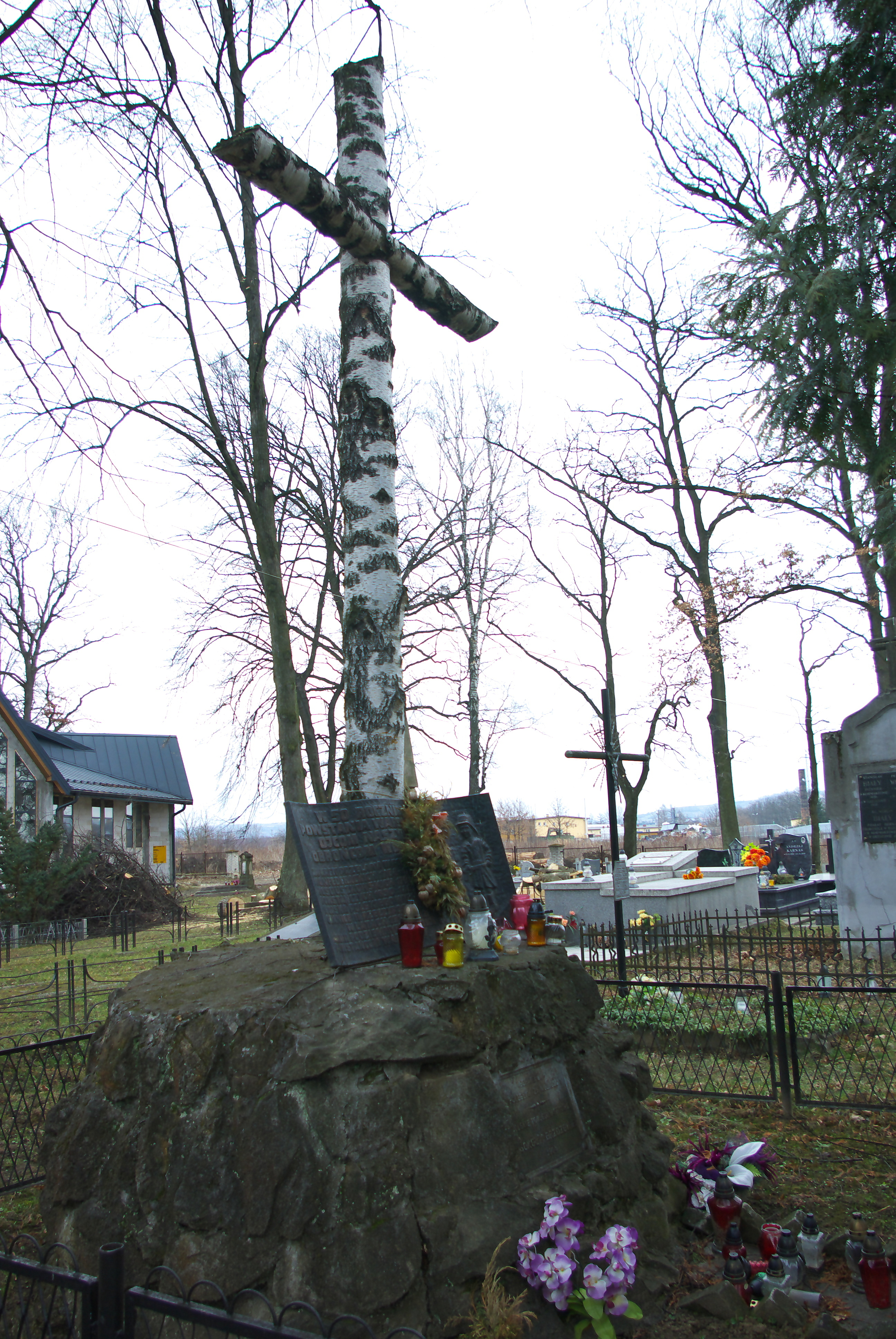
Insurgents' monument at Brzozów cemetery

Monuments in Brzozów are memorials and sculptural works erected in Brzozów, Poland, to commemorate people or events significant to the city's and Poland's history.

== Monuments ==
- The monument commemorating the 500th anniversary of the Battle of Grunwald was initiated by Senator Stanisław Białek. It is located next to the current PKS bus station on Grunwald Square. During its dedication on 27 June 1910, school inspector Józef Lorenz delivered a speech titled "Education of Our People." The monument is listed in the register of historical monuments under number B-34/2001. Designed by Lviv sculptor Władysław Gawliński, the monument was crafted from stone. It features a rectangular base supporting a cuboid, topped with a statue of Jadwiga of Poland. A plaque reads: "To the Queen of the Polish Crown. On the 500th Anniversary of Grunwald 1910". The front of the base displays an eagle sculpture and an inscription: "On 22 July 1946, this monument was renovated and restored to its original form at the citizens' expense".
- In 1938, a decision was made to erect a monument in Brzozów's city park to commemorate war volunteers from the city and Brzozów County.
- The National Remembrance Monument to Those Who Gave Their Lives for Poland was originally erected to commemorate the Red Army. Designed by Władysław Niemiec, it was unveiled on 22 July 1950 to mark Brzozów's liberation from German occupation on 3 August 1944. The monument initially featured a star emblem and a plaque stating: "Eternal honor and glory to the heroes of the Red Army, fallen in the fight for the freedom of all peoples". In 1966, to mark the Millennium of the Polish State, a second plaque was added: "966–1966 – In memory of those fallen in the fight for People's Poland, Brzozów 16 April 1966". This plaque covered a niche containing an urn with soil from battlefields and execution sites. The monument was renovated in 1974 by the Brzozów County Commission for the Protection of Monuments of Struggle and Martyrdom. In 1990, the Temporary Committee for the Construction of the National Remembrance Monument, under the Brzozów Branch of the World Association of Home Army Soldiers, was formed to transform the Red Army monument into one commemorating Those Who Gave Their Lives for Poland. Its activities were reported in the Cegiełkogazetki newsletter. On 11 November 1992, the monument's name was changed to To Those Who Gave Their Lives for Poland 1939–1989. The unveiling was performed by Jan Salamak, a Home Army veteran and one of Brzozów's oldest residents, Mayor Józef Rzepka, and Town Council Chairman Lucjan Krynicki. The monument was consecrated by Father Julian Pudło, and a trumpeter played the Brzozów Anthem. The redesigned monument, created by Adam Zarych from Blizne, features an eagle symbolizing the fight against fascism and communism.
- In a forest near the Brzozów-Zdrój Children's Social Care Home, a site of execution of Brzozów's Jewish community is located. On 19 August 1990, a mausoleum-monument, designed by Natan Weiss, son of a Brzozów baker, and crafted by Tomasz Paściak from Brzozów, was unveiled. The unveiling was attended by 20 representatives of the Survivors of Brzozów Jewish Community in Israel, who funded the mausoleum, coming from Israel, Australia, France, Germany, and the USA. The structure consists of six columns joined by a slab forming a canopy, topped with a miniature dome of the Jerusalem Temple and a menorah. The six columns symbolize the six million Jews killed during the Holocaust.
- Erected in 1996 on Brzozów's military cemetery, the symbolic grave of World War II victims was initiated by the Brzozów Branch of the World Association of Home Army Soldiers. Designed and built by Adam Zarych from Blizne, it was unveiled on 8 May 1996 by family members of those who died, Emma Pilawska-Kozak and Zbigniew Kilarski, and Mayor Józef Rzepka. It was consecrated by Father Julian Pudło and hospital chaplain Father Tomasz Zięba. The monument depicts a globe encircled by a ribbon listing places where Polish soldiers fought and died, topped with a cross bearing Jesus Christ and four smaller crosses representing the four corners of the world. The accompanying plaque references World War II and Polish participation on all fronts. Nearby are two symbolic plots for fallen soldiers of the Polish People's Army and the Home Army.
- The monument commemorting Bishop Józef Sebastian Pelczar, marking the first anniversary of his canonization, was unveiled in May 2004 near Brzozów's collegiate church. Created by Maciej Syrek and Wołodymyr Romaniw, the 1.95-meter bronze statue was funded by an anonymous donor. The idea emerged after Pelczar's canonization Mass on 18 May 2003 in Rome. On 12 May 2004, Archbishop Józef Michalik consecrated the monument.
- The monument Open the Doors to Christ, commemorating the 27-year pontificate of Pope John Paul II, was unveiled on 2 April 2006 in front of Brzozów's collegiate church on Adam Mickiewicz Street. It was consecrated by Father Stanisław Mac from Rzeszów, assisted by parish priest Franciszek Rząsa and Father Tomasz Zięba, following a Mass.
- The monument to King Casimir III the Great at King Casimir the Great High School in Brzozów was erected in 2009 to commemorate the school's centenary. Created by Marian Konieczny from Jasionów, with the surrounding area designed by his brother Adam Konieczny, it was unveiled on 19 September 2009 by its funder, Brzozów County Starosta Zygmunt Błaż.
- Erected in 2003, the monument commemorating the visit of a copy of the Black Madonna of Częstochowa icon was designed and crafted by Bogdan Biernat from Krosno.
- The Jesus Christ statue, erected as a gesture of gratitude to God and people for the centenary of the High School and the 50th anniversary of the Building Schools Complex, was consecrated on 2 September 2009 by Archbishop Józef Michalik.

== Obelisks ==
- Obelisk with a cross on the Bar Confederation's grave, dating from between 1850 and 1890, is registered as a historical monument under number A-30/2000. Around 1830, bones of Bar Confederation fighters, exhumed from a mass grave in Stara Wieś, were buried in two coffins at Brzozów's old cemetery. In 1904, the Brzozów branch of the Sokół movement erected a stone obelisk with a classicist columnar chapel topped by a wooden cross. A metal plaque reads: "To the Heroes Fallen for Freedom. Polish Gymnastic Society 'Sokół' in Brzozów 1904". Before World War II, ceremonies were held there on national uprising anniversaries. The grave now symbolizes the Tomb of the Unknown Soldier. Nearby stands an obelisk erected in 1823 by Gniezno Archbishop Ignacy Raczyński.
- Around 1772, Bar Confederation fighters battled Russian forces near the border of Stara Wieś and Brzozów. The fallen were buried in a mass grave. Around 1825, Father Józef Sacher, a Jesuit from Stara Wieś, funded an obelisk. The plastered masonry monument consists of a square base with rectangular panels, a column with a capital and profiled entablature, and a rectangular chapel with four niches closed by segmental arches. It is topped with a tented metal roof and an iron cross. A glazed niche at the column's base displays an image of the Stara Wieś Madonna. Before World War II, ceremonies were held there on 3 May, with the Volunteer Fire Department organizing fireworks displays. During construction, two coffins of bones were exhumed and transferred to Brzozów's old cemetery.
- Brzozów and its surroundings were liberated by the 38th Army of the First Ukrainian Front, led by General Colonel Kirill Moskalenko. In battles in the former Brzozów County, 17 Polish and 483 Soviet soldiers died. Approximately 3,000 Soviet soldiers, along with four Polish and some Czechoslovak soldiers, are buried in 15 large mass graves at the military cemetery on Bohaterów II Wojny Światowej Street. Exhumations were conducted from 1951 to 1953 by the Brzozów County National Council's Communal Economy Department, led by Karol Korsky. 10 graves contain identified Soviet soldiers' remains. An obelisk stands among the graves, and a plaque at the cemetery entrance reads: "Military Cemetery of Those Fallen in World War II 1939–1945".
- On 10 August 1942, during the liquidation of Brzozów's Jewish district, Gestapo and German police from Krosno killed approximately 1,400 Jews from the city and surrounding areas. At Brzozów's stadium, victims were divided into men, women, and children, then taken to a forest, forced to dig three mass graves, and killed by shots to the head or blows with an iron bar. To conceal the crime, quicklime was poured into the graves and covered with earth. Only 55 victims' names were identified. In 1962, a plaque was placed at the site, and an obelisk, designed by Jerzy Szafrański and initiated by Józef Rogowski from Brzozów, was erected near the Brzozów–Zmiennica road.
- An obelisk was erected in 1999 to mark the 15th anniversary of Father Jerzy Popiełuszko's death, initiated by Henryk Kozik, chairman of the Solidarity Coordination Council. On 14 November 1999, the plaque was unveiled by Stanisław Zając, Bogdan Rzońca, Zbigniew Sieczkoś, and Tadeusz Majchrowicz, and consecrated by Father Adam Sudoł. The plaque, funded by Solidarity and Brzozów County residents, was crafted by Andrzej Samborowski-Zajdel from Głowienka.

== Commemorative stones ==
- On 7 October 1969, to mark the 25th anniversary of the Citizens' Militia and Security Service, a commemorative stone was unveiled to honor officers killed between 1944 and 1947. The ceremony included presenting a banner to the Brzozów County Citizens' Militia Command. Initiated by Bronisław Froń, chairman of the Brzozów City Committee of the Front of National Unity, the stone was funded by public and workplace contributions and placed at the site of an old obelisk in the market square. Crafted by Stanisław Macios from Stara Wieś, it featured a bronze plaque stating: "In tribute to the officers of the Citizens' Militia, Security Service, and ORMO members who fell in the fight to consolidate people's power in Brzozów County 1944–1947. Brzozów County Society". The names of the officers were listed below, with "Honor to Their Memory" at the base. The monument was dismantled on 31 May 2012 during the market square's revitalization.
