= Jan Beyzym =

Jesuit priest

Blessed Jan Beyzym S.J.
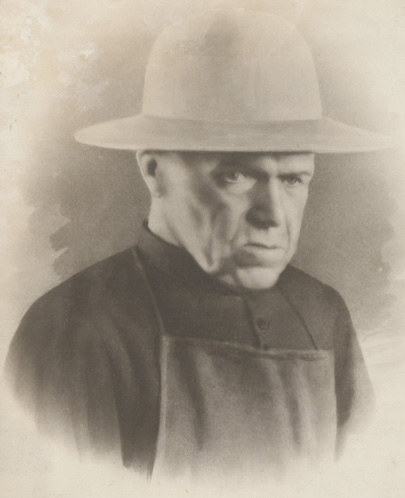

Priest
- Born: 15 May 1850; Stari Beizymy, Shepetivka, Russian Empire
- Died: 2 October 1912 (aged 62); Marana, Fianarantsoa, Madagascar
- Venerated in: Roman Catholic Church
- Beatified: 18 August 2002, Błonie Park, Kraków, Poland by Pope John Paul II
- Feast: 12 October
- Attributes: Priest's cassock
- Patronage: Missionaries; Against leprosy; Teachers

Jan Beyzym (15 May 1850 – 2 October 1912) was a Polish Jesuit priest known for his work with lepers in Madagascar. His beatification process began in 1985. In 1992 he was titled Venerable. On 18 August 2002, Pope John Paul II, while in Poland, beatified Beyzym.

== Life ==
Jan Beyzym was born in Stari Beizymy, Russian Empire (now Ukraine), on 15 May 1850, the eldest of five children of Jan and Olga Beyzym. His father was a freedom fighter and in 1863, for his activities, was sentenced to death in absentia. The son Jan moved with his mother and siblings to Kiev and studied there from 1864 until 1871.

He completed his education in Kiev and, on his father's advice, joined the Jesuits. He was a novitiate from 10 December 1872 to 1874 at Stara Wies. During his novitiate there was a cholera epidemic and he received the permission of his superior to go out into the streets to tend to the sick. Beyzym received his ordination as a priest on 26 July 1881 in Kraków from Bishop Albin Dunajewski.

After his ordination he taught French and Russian until 1898 at Jesuit boarding schools in Tarnopol and Chyrów. In 1898 he left to join the Jesuit missions to lepers near Tananariwa in Madagascar. Beyzym left Poland on October 17, 1898 and arrived on 30 December at Red Island before being posted to Ambahivoraka near Antananarivo. In October 1902 he began to see the construction of a leper hospital at Marana and it was finished and inaugurated on 16 August 1911.

Beyzym died on 2 October 1912 at the age of 62; his health declined and he had arteriosclerosis and sores simultaneously, which confined him to bed. His body was exhumed and relocated back to his native Poland on 8 December 1993.

== Beatification ==
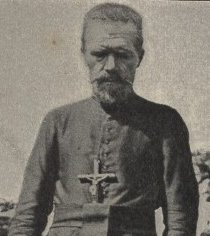
Bezym c. 1904 in Madagascar.

The beatification process opened in Kraków from 1984 until 1986 while a second diocesan process opened and closed in Fianarantsoa in 1987; the Congregation for the Causes of Saints later validated the processes on 27 October 1989. The official start to the process came on 27 September 1985 after the C.C.S. issued the official "nihil obstat" to the cause and titled him as a Servant of God. The C.C.S. later received the Positio in 1990. Theologians approved this on 28 April 1992 as did the C.C.S. on 3 November 1992; Pope John Paul II said his life of heroic virtue was confirmed and titled Bezym as Venerable on 21 December 1992.

John Paul II decreed that a healing credited to the late priest was a miracle on 5 July 2002 and beatified Beyzym two months later on 18 August 2002 while on an apostolic visit to Poland.
