= Brzozów =

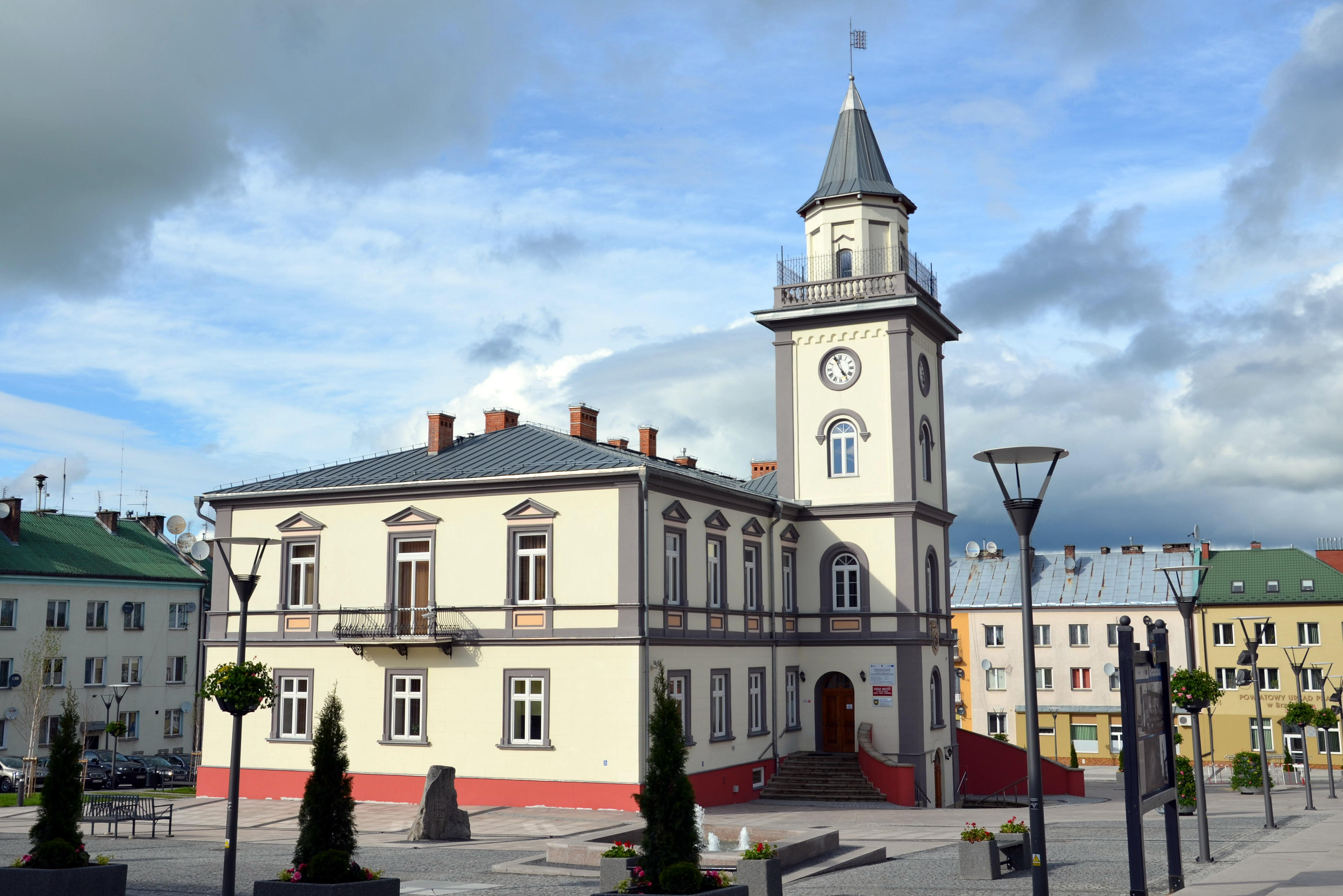
- Town hall in Brzozów

- Flag Coat of arms
- Interactive map of Brzozów
- Location within Poland
- Coordinates: 49°42′N 22°01′E
- Country: Poland
- Voivodeship: Subcarpathian
- County: Brzozów
- Gmina: Brzozów
- Founded: 1359
- Town rights: 1386

Government
  - Mayor: Szymon Stapiński

Area
  - Total: 11.46 km^{2} (4.42 sq mi)

Population (31 December 2021)
  - Total: 7,336
  - Density: 640.1/km^{2} (1,658/sq mi)
- Time zone: UTC+1 (CET)
  - Summer (DST): UTC+2 (CEST)
- Postal code: 36-200
- Vehicle registration: RBR
- Website: www.brzozow.pl

Brzozów [ˈbʐɔzuf] (Yiddish: ברעזשוב Brezhov; lat. Brozovia, or Prozzow) is a town in south-eastern Poland, with 7,336 inhabitants as of December 2021. It is situated in Subcarpathian Voivodeship and is the seat of both Brzozów County and the smaller administrative district of Gmina Brzozów.

== History ==
Brzozów was founded in 1359, Brzozów took on the name of an earlier, adjacent settlement of the 14th century, which gradually over time came to be known as Stara Wieś (Old Village). A large Jesuit Basilica and Monastery, built in 1760, is found in Stara Wieś. Queen Mary donated Brzozów and four other villages to the Bishops of Przemyśl in 1384. From the middle 14th to the early 19th centuries, the Bishops of Przemyśl resided principally at Brzozów.

Tatar attacks took place in 1525, 1623–25, 1629 and with heavy losses in 1674. Afterwards, Brzozów declined commercially until the 19th century.

From the First Partition of Poland in 1772 until 1918, the town was part of the Austrian monarchy (Austria side after the compromise of 1867), head of the district with the same name, one of the 78 Bezirkshauptmannschaften in Austrian Galicia province (Crownland).

In the interwar period, the town was a county seat in the Lwów Voivodeship of Poland. According to the 1921 census, it had a population of 4,160, 72.9% Polish and 26.5% Jewish.

Following the German-Soviet invasion of Poland, which started World War II in September 1939, the town was occupied by Germany until 1944. A large part of the Jewish minority was massacred on 10 August 1942 by the German SS. The remainder were sent to death camps or murdered by the Nazis during the war. Since then, there has been no Jewish presence in the town.

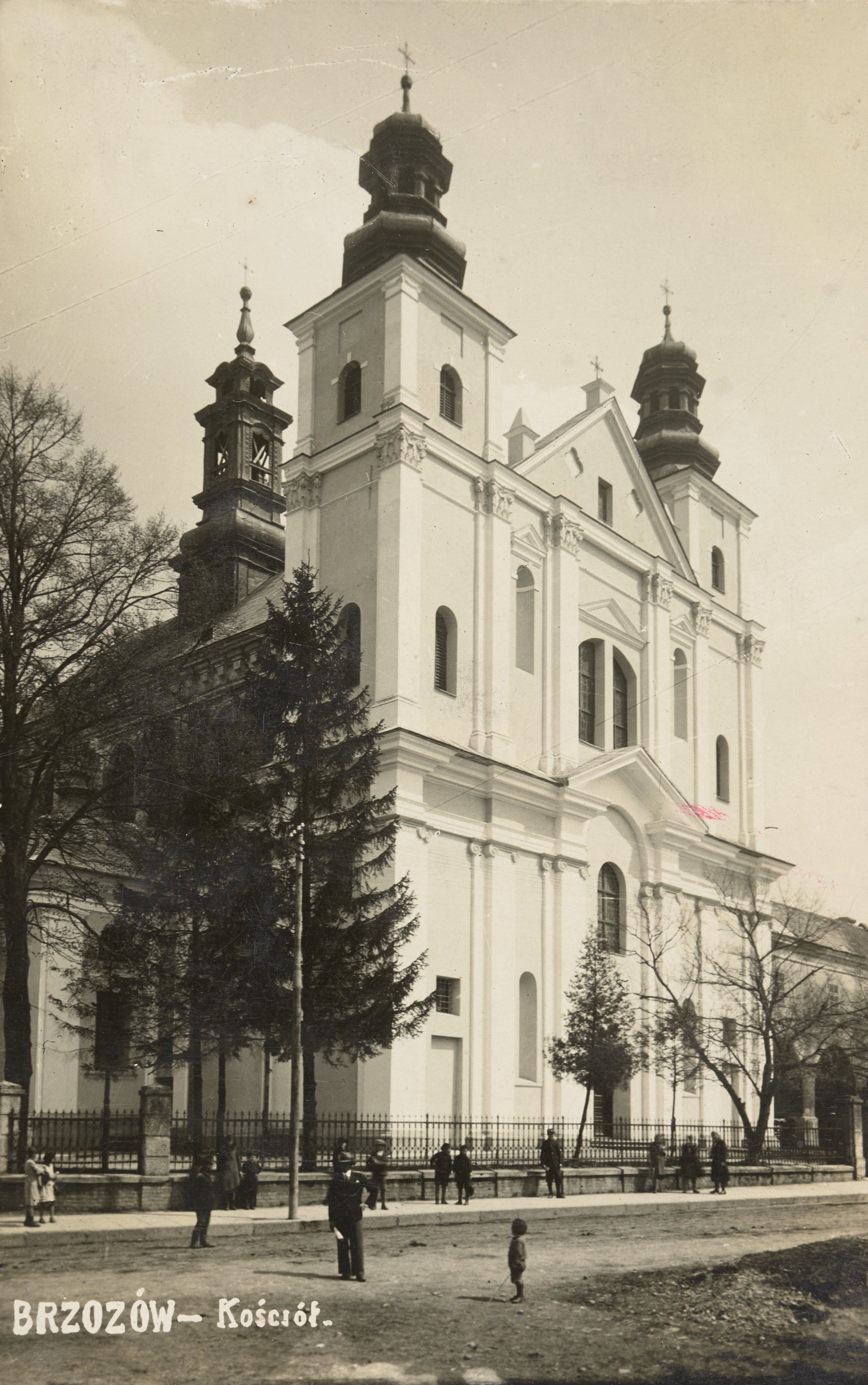
Church of the Transfiguration, before 1939

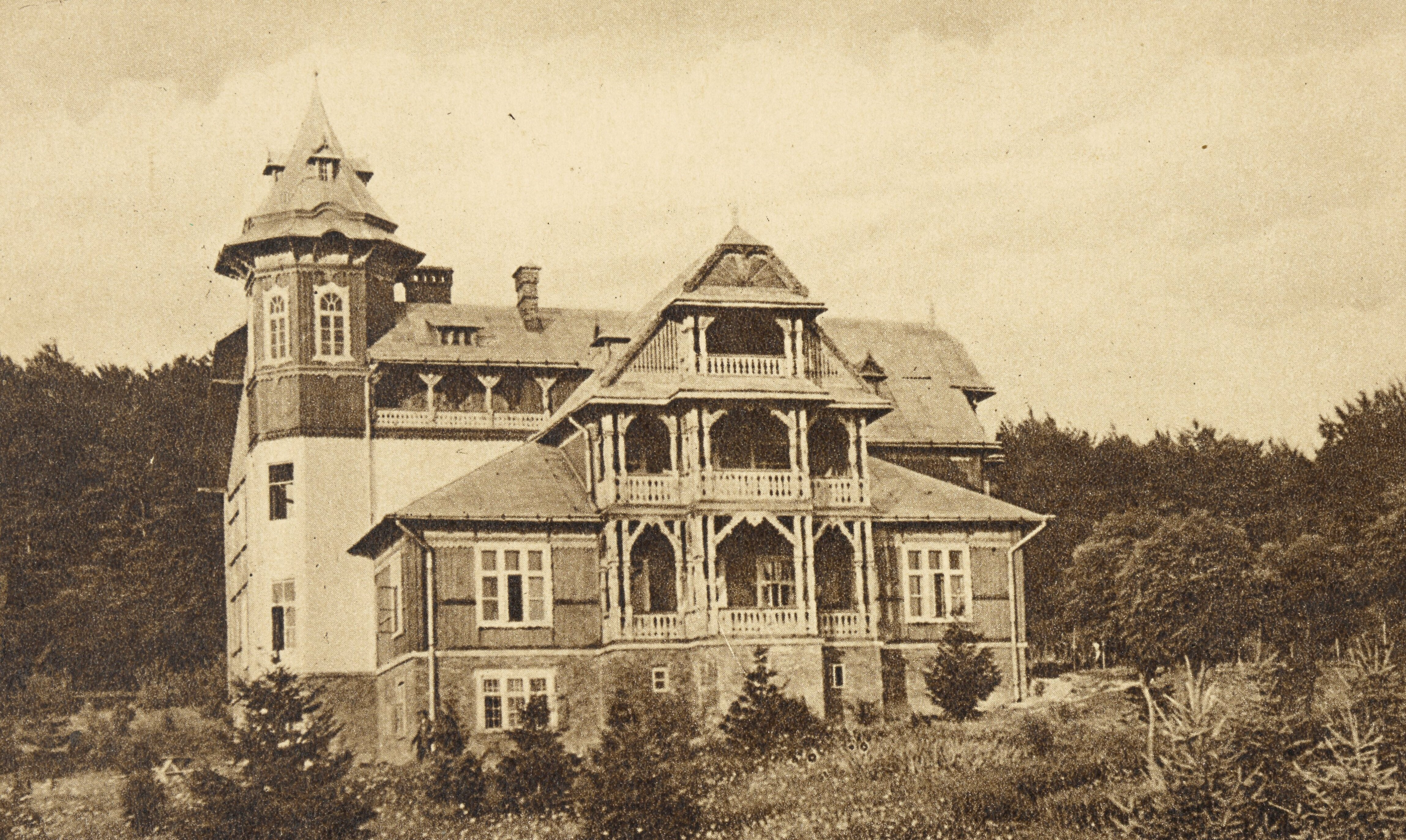
Residence of the Przemyśl bishops, 1933

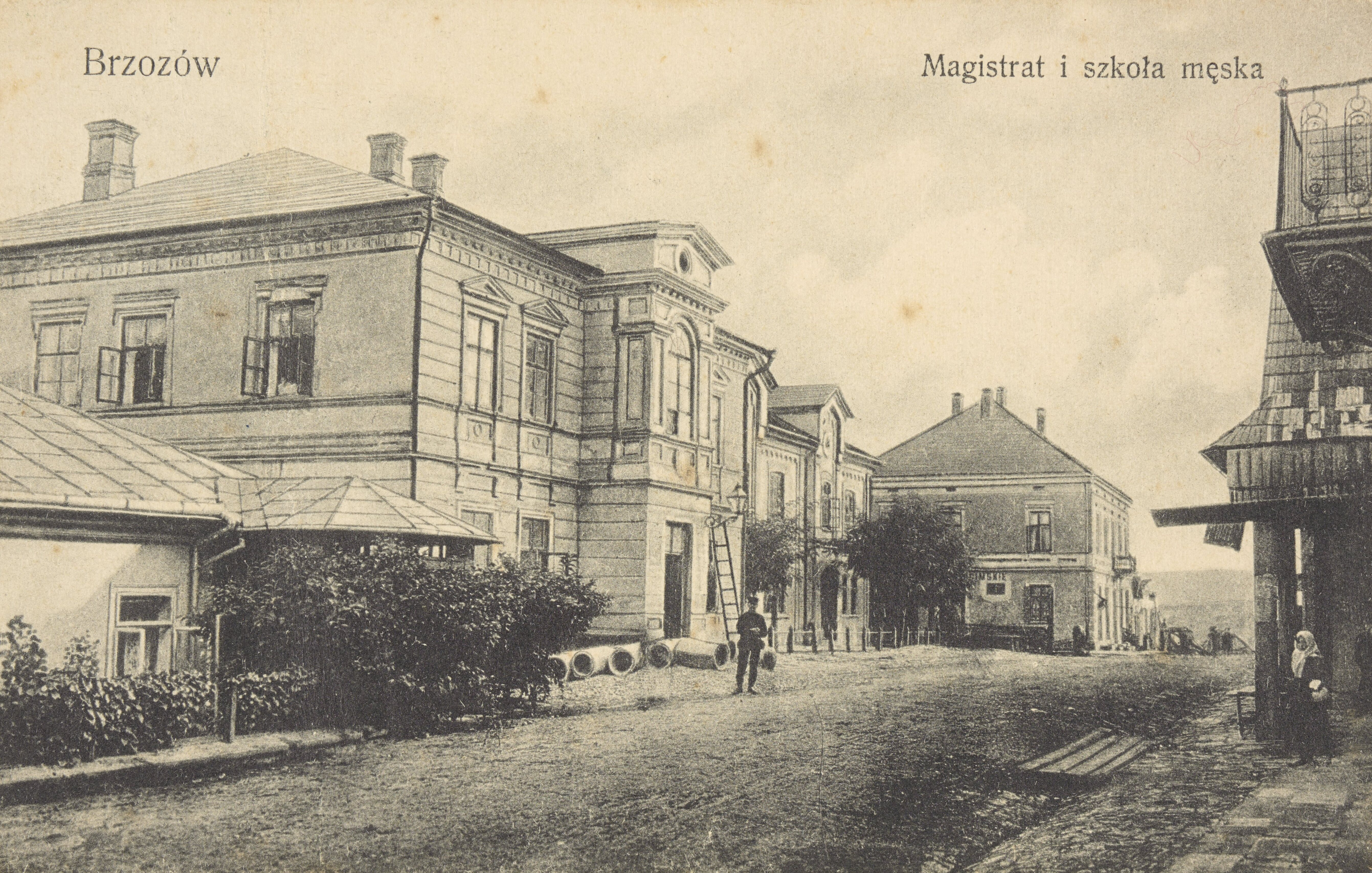
Town hall, before 1920

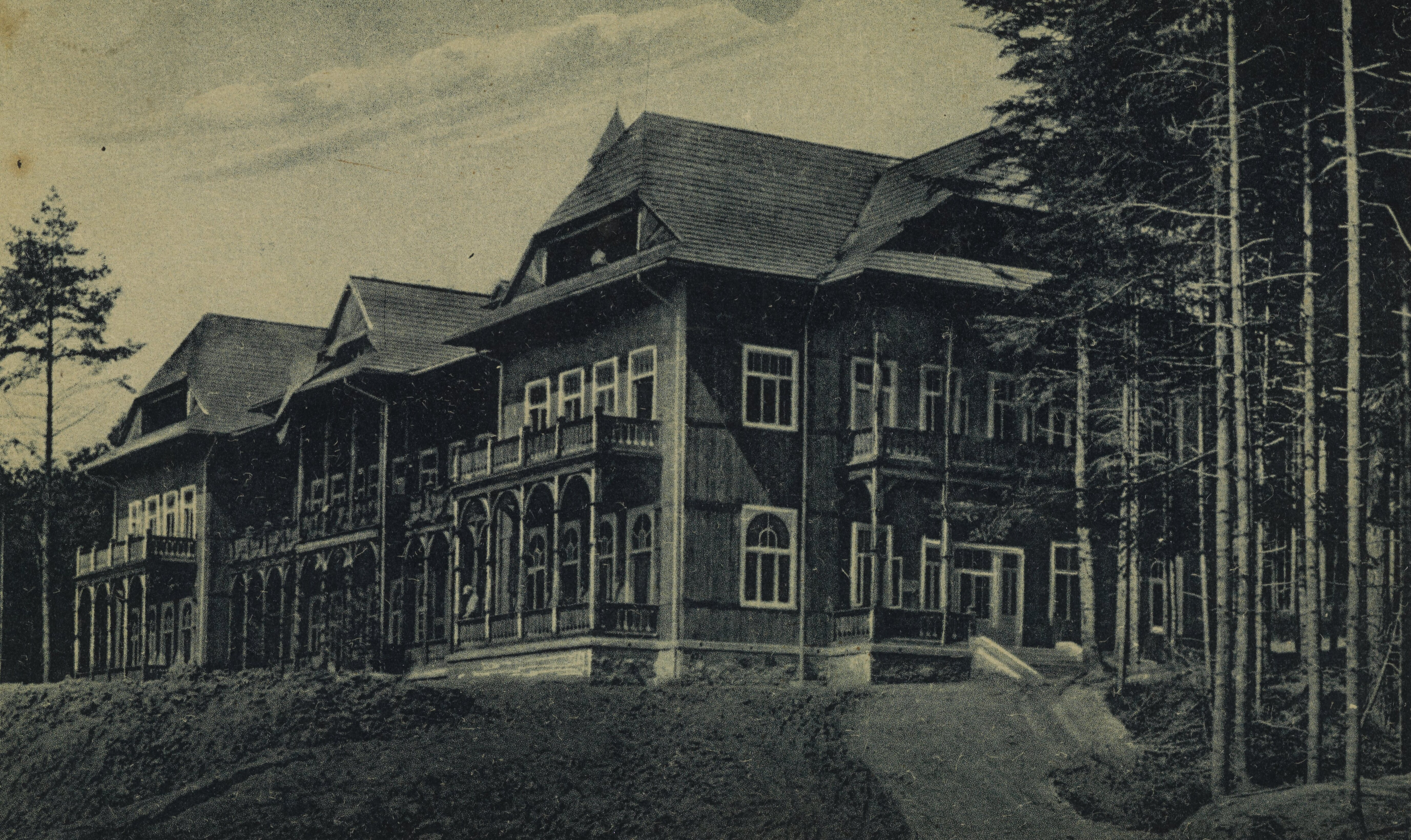
Spa house, 1931

== Economy ==
In 1550–1650, nineteen trades were practiced here including cloth-making, food processing, and leather-making as well as wood, metal, and ceramic trades. The first hospital of record is mentioned in 1518. A parish school was in existence in the early 16th century, and annual elections of mayors and judges, subject to approval of the bishop, commenced in 1410. The town for hundreds of years had been known for the manufacture of combs, but the industry disappeared by the 1960s. Manufacture of oils was another industry in Brzozów; walnut oil was a famous product reportedly supplied to the royal table in Kraków in the 16th century. Oils were also produced from plum core.

A post-office was opened in 1851.

== Gallery ==
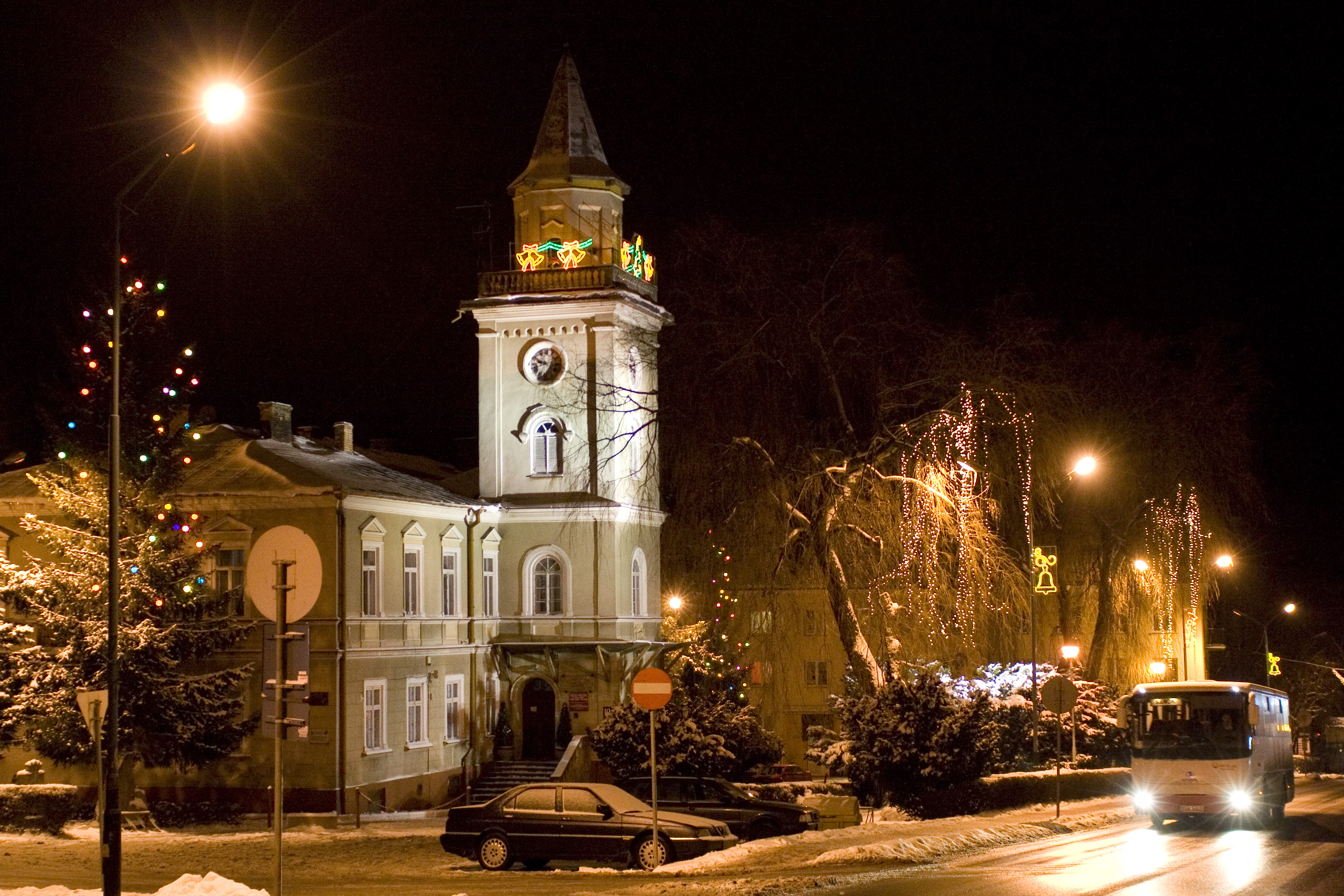
Brzowów town hall

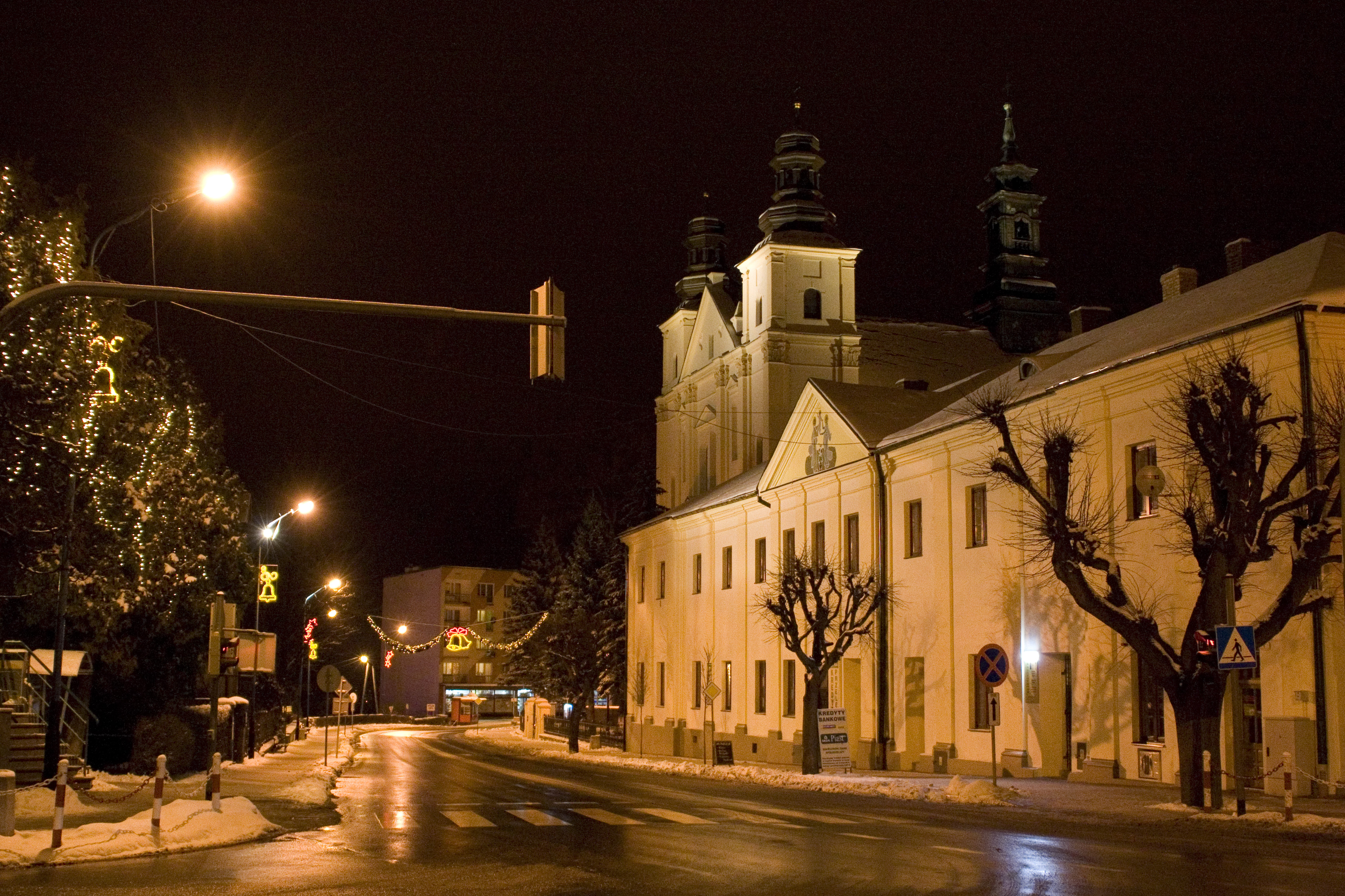
Seminarium

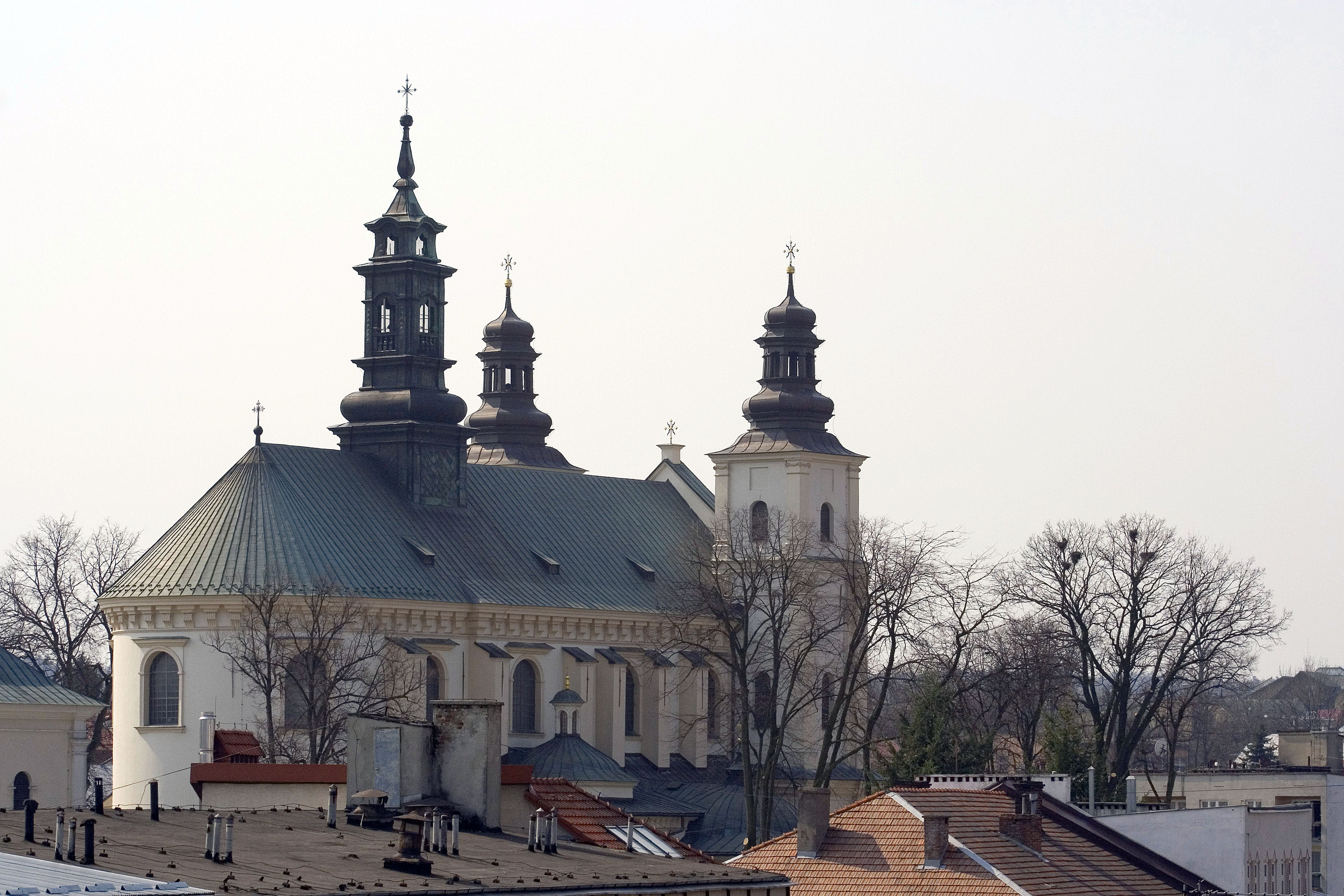
Transfiguration of Jesus Church

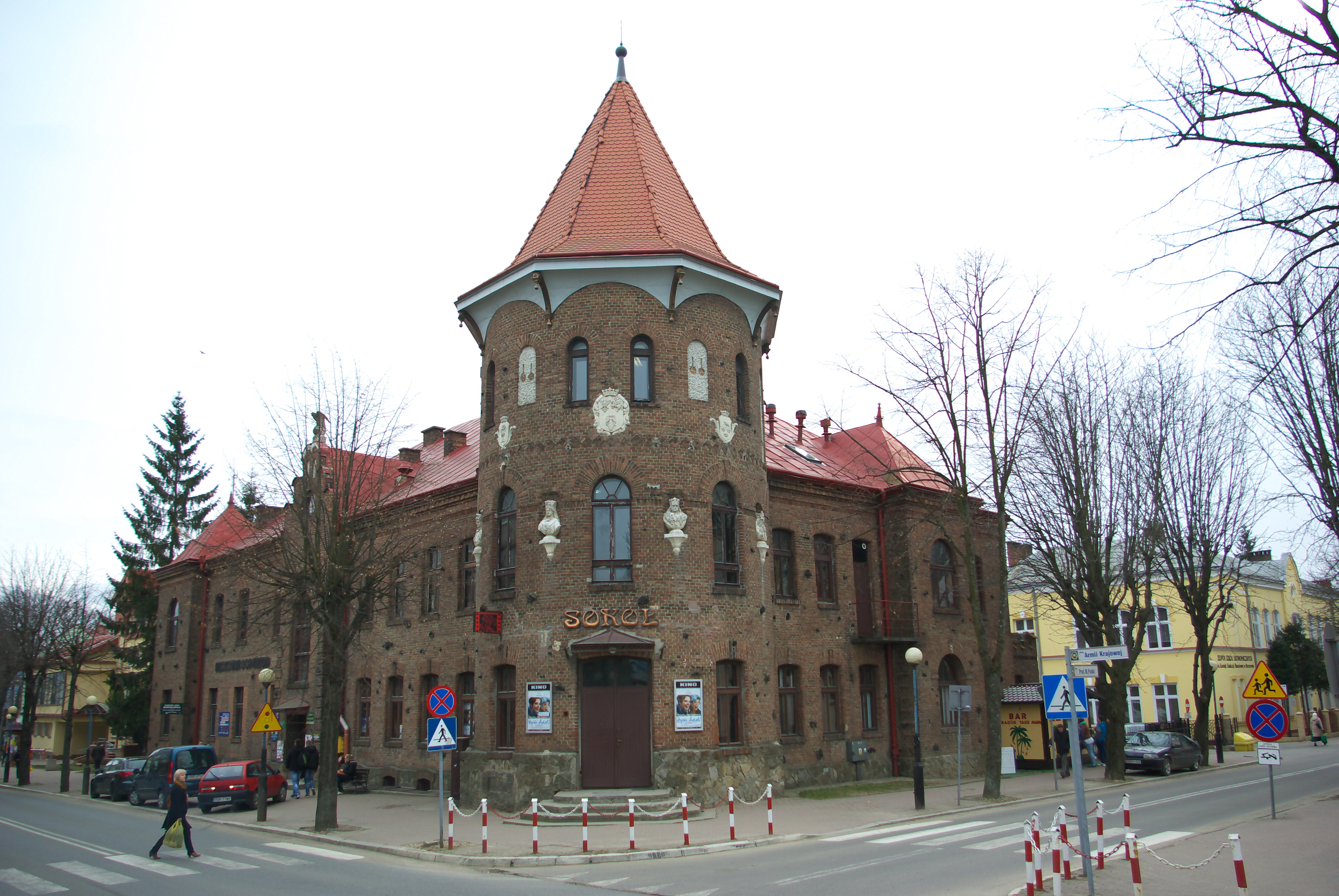
Sokół Gymnastics Society Building

== International relations ==
=== Twin towns – Sister cities ===
Brzozów is twinned with:

- Sambir, Ukraine
- Moldava nad Bodvou, Slovakia

== See also ==
- List of monuments in Brzozów
