= Stara Wieś, Podkarpackie Voivodeship =

Stara Wieś
- Village
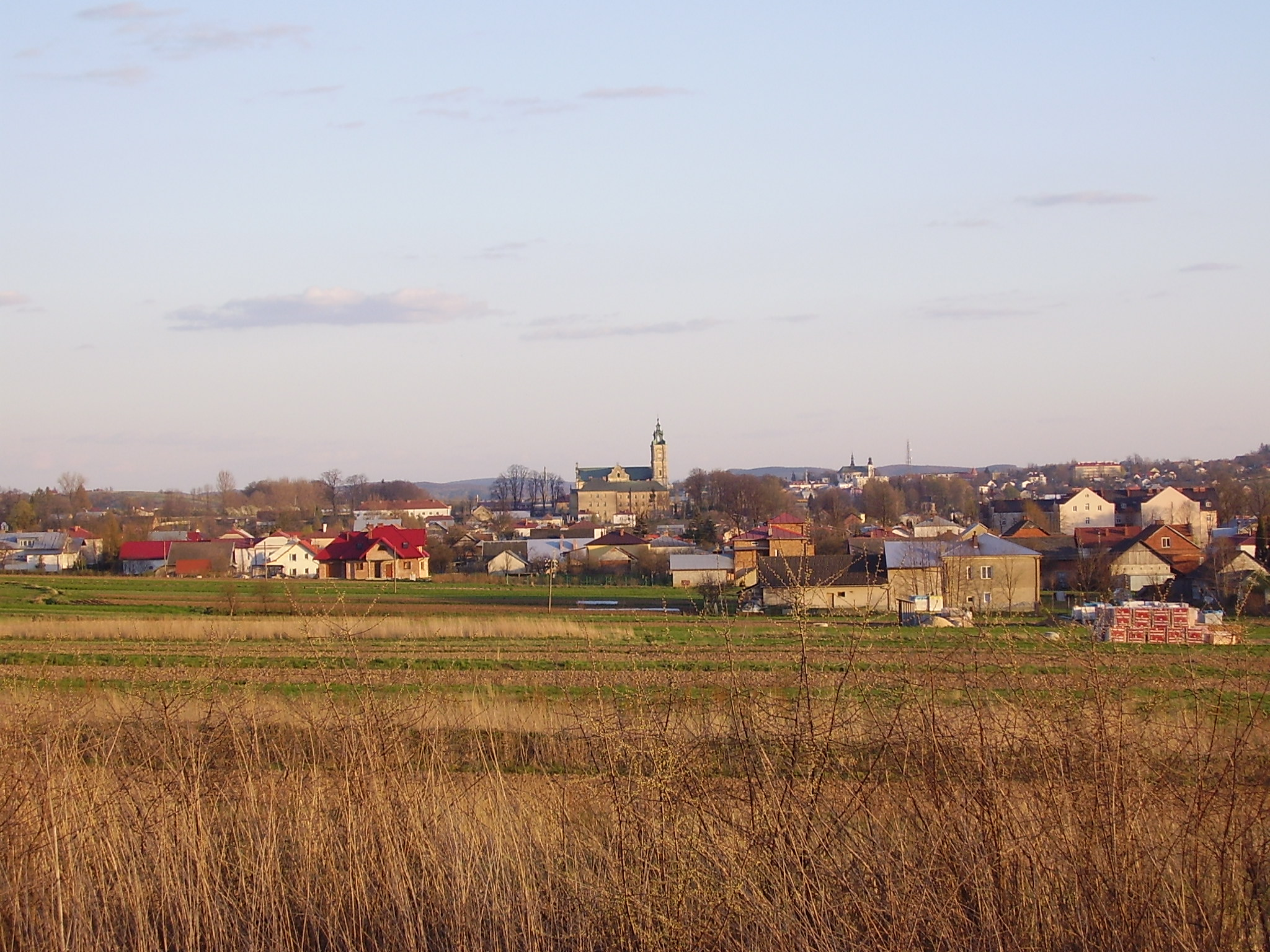
- General view of the village

- Location within Poland
- Coordinates: 49°43′10″N 22°0′51″E
- Country: Poland
- Voivodeship: Subcarpathian
- County: Brzozów
- Gmina: Brzozów

Population
  - Total: 3,500
- Time zone: UTC+1 (CET)
  - Summer (DST): UTC+2 (CEST)
- Vehicle registration: RBR

Stara Wieś [ˈstara ˈvʲɛɕ] is a large village in the administrative district of Gmina Brzozów, within Brzozów County, Subcarpathian Voivodeship, in south-eastern Poland.

== History ==
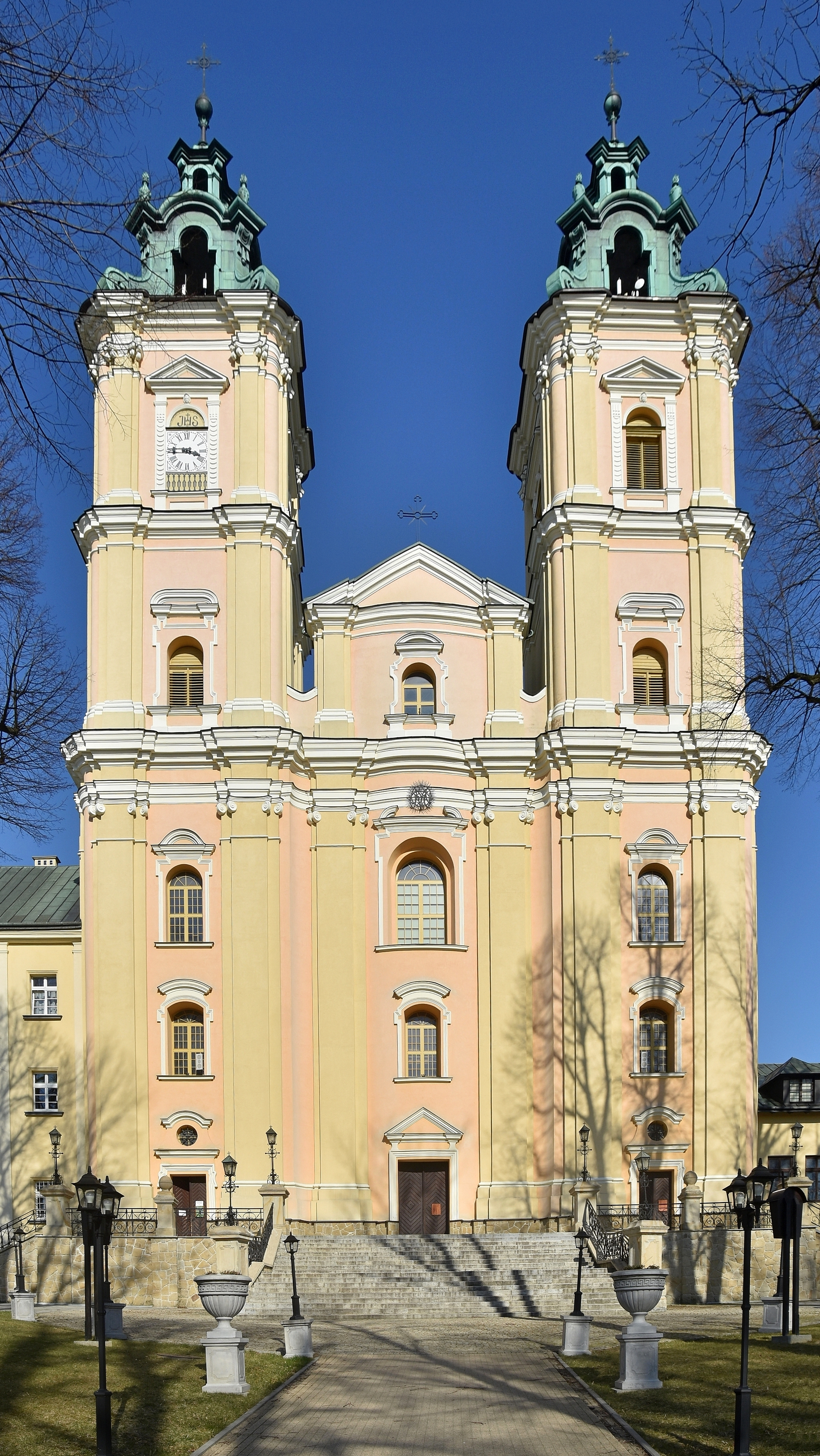
Baroque Basilica in Stara Wieś

The land which Stara Wieś and its immediate neighbour, Brzozów occupy today, in the early 14th century was covered in birch forest, hence the name Brzozów, derived from Brzoza, meaning birch tree. On 2 October 1359, King Casimir III the Great at Kraków granted Stefan Wojosta, a royal knight, the privilege of establishing a village in a forest named Brzozowe. That name was adopted for Wojosta's settlement. Later related names appeared in documents: Bresen (1384), Brzozowo (1403), Brzozowa (1437). In the late 14th century, another settlement was built above the original village to escape the regular river floods and for better defences. In 1460 this second settlement took on the name of Brzozów while the original settlement became known as Stara Wieś meaning the "Old Village".

The King's original grant consisted of 50 franconian łans (about 3000 acres) distributed as follows—3 lans for the village elder, 2 lans for maintenance of the church, two common lans for grazing - and the remaining 43 lans for settlers with one lan each as set out according to the Magdeburg rights. A church building was funded as part of the settlement. The first church, dedicated as Corpus Christi, was built between 1359 and 1375. A second church, dedicated as the Birth of Our Holy Lady, was built in 1698 replacing the three century old wooden structure. It contained three altars. In 1730 with the arrival of the Pauline Fathers construction commenced on the present brick church, the Basilica of the Assumption of the Most Holy Virgin.

After the Partitions of Poland, Stara Wieś fell to the Kingdom of Galicia and Lodomeria in the Habsburg empire. There was a convent of the Sisters Servants of the Immaculate Conception of Mary while the Pauline Fathers ceded their monastery to the Society of Jesus in the second half of the 19th century. The Jesuits founded their college and Novitiate in the monastic buildings until its "suspension" in 2016.

In the interwar period, it was located in the Brzozów County in the Lwów Voivodeship of Poland. According to the 1921 census, it had a population of 2,473, 99.6% Polish.

== People associated with the village ==
- Józef Bielawski, Arabist
- Jan Beyzym SJ
- Adam Kozłowiecki SJ, Cardinal
- Włodzimierz Ledóchowski SJ, General of the Society of Jesus
- Adam Chmielowski, Franciscan friar
- Leonia Nastał
