= History of Toruń =

The following article details the history of Toruń, a city in Kuyavian–Pomeranian Voivodeship, Poland.

== Early history ==
The first settlement in the vicinity of Toruń is dated by archaeologists to 1100 BC (Lusatian culture). During early medieval times, in the 7th through 13th centuries, it was the location of an old Slavonic settlement, at a ford in the Vistula river. In the 10th century it became part of the emerging Polish state ruled by the Piast dynasty.

== Teutonic Order ==
In spring 1231 the Teutonic Knights crossed the river Vistula at the height of Nieszawa and established a fortress. On 28 December 1233, the Teutonic Knights Hermann von Salza and Hermann Balk, signed the foundation charters for Toruń (Thorn) and Chełmno. The original document was lost in 1244. The set of rights in general is known as Kulm law. In 1236, due to frequent flooding, it was relocated to the present site of the Old Town. In 1239 Franciscan friars settled in the city, followed in 1263 by Dominicans. In 1264 the adjacent New Town was founded predominantly to house Toruń's growing population of craftsmen and artisans. In 1280, the city (or as it was then, both cities) joined the mercantile Hanseatic League, and thus became an important medieval trade centre.

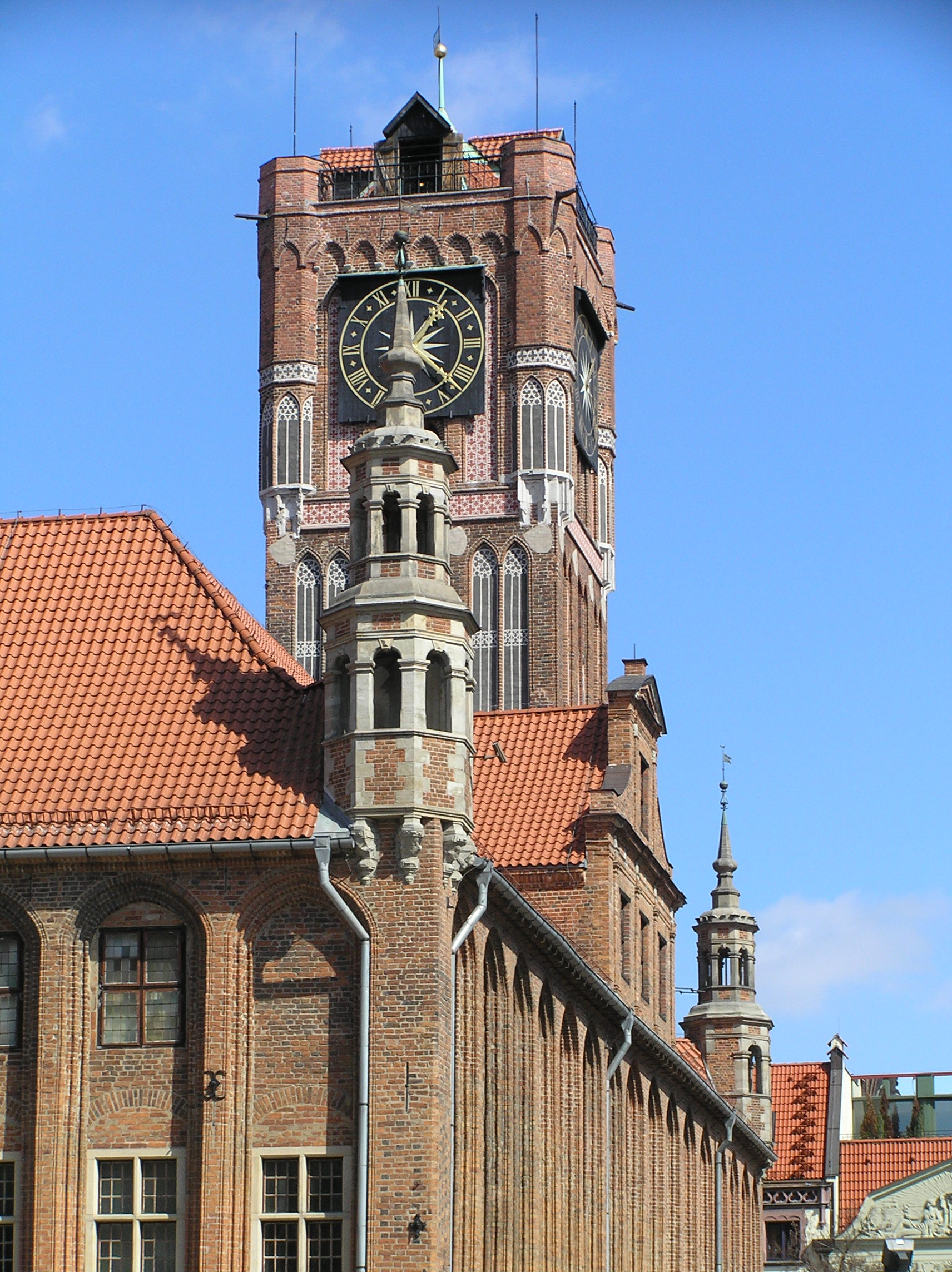
Gothic City Hall (Ratusz) started in the 13th century

During the Polish–Lithuanian–Teutonic War, in 1410, the townspeople expelled the Teutonic Knights from the city, welcomed Polish troops and recognized Polish rule. Polish King Władysław II Jagiełło granted Toruń new privileges. After the First Peace of Thorn was signed in the city in February 1411, the city fell back to the Teutonic Order. In 1411 the city left the Hanseatic League. In the 1420s, King Władysław II Jagiełło built the Dybów Castle, located in present-day left-bank Toruń, which he visited numerous times. During the next big Polish–Teutonic War, the Dybów Castle was occupied by the Teutonic Knights from 1431 to 1435. The city refused to pay taxes to the Teutonic Knights, not wanting to finance their war against Poland.

In 1440, the gentry of Thorn co-founded the anti-Teutonic Prussian Confederation. The local city council together with the city council of Chełmno and the knights of the Chełmno Land were the official representatives of the Confederation. From 1452, talks between the Polish King Casimir IV Jagiellon and the burghers of the Confederation were held in the Dybów Castle. The Confederation rose against the Monastic state of the Teutonic Knights in 1454 and its delegation submitted a petition to Polish King Casimir IV Jagiellon asking him to regain power over the region as the rightful ruler. An act of incorporation was signed in Kraków (6 March 1454), recognizing the region, including Thorn, as part of the Polish Kingdom. Those events led to the Thirteen Years' War. The local mayor pledged allegiance to the Polish King during the incorporation in March 1454 in Kraków, and then on 8 May 1454, an official ceremony was held in Thorn, during which the nobility, knights, landowners, mayors and local officials from Chełmno Land, including Thorn, again solemnly swore allegiance to the Polish King and the Kingdom of Poland. Since 1454, the city was authorized by King Casimir IV to mint Polish coins. After almost 200 years, the New and Old Towns amalgamated in 1454. The Poles systematically destroyed the Teutonic castle because they didn't want the Knights, or anyone else, returning to take over. During the war, Casimir IV often stayed at the Dybów Castle, and Thorn financially supported the Polish Army. The Thirteen Years' War ended in October 1466 with the Second Peace of Thorn, in which the Teutonic Order renounced any claims to the city and recognized it as part of Poland. It was administratively located in the Chełmno Voivodeship of Royal Prussia.

== Autonomous city under the Polish Crown ==
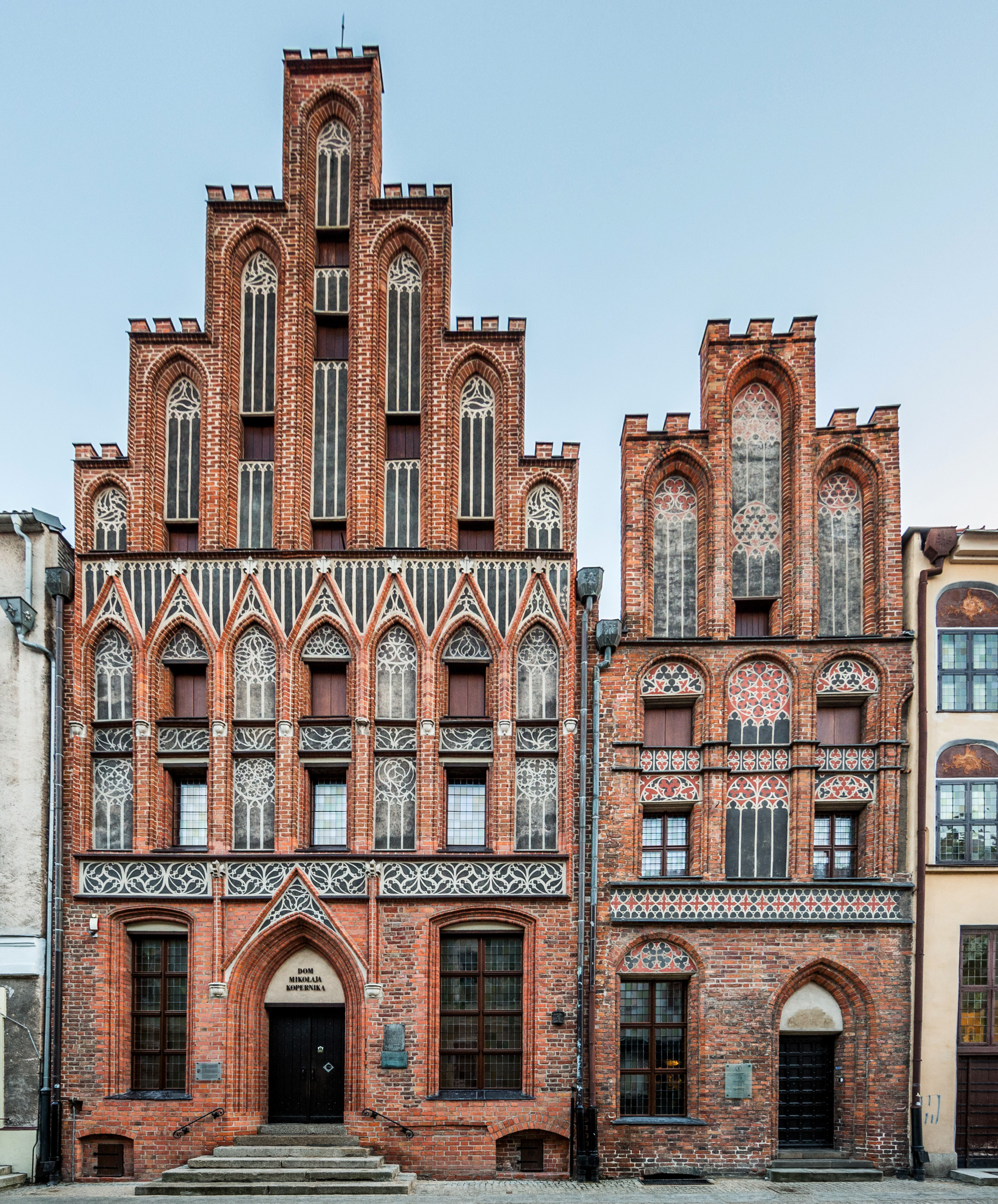
Copernicus House in Toruń, now a museum

The Polish King granted the city great privileges, similar to those of Danzig. In 1473 astronomer Nicolaus Copernicus was born and in 1501 Polish King John I Albert died in Thorn; his heart was buried in Thorn's St. John's Church. In 1506 Toruń became a royal city of Poland. In 1528, the royal mint started operating in Thorn. In 1568 a gymnasium was founded, which after 1594 became one of the leading schools of northern Poland for the centuries to come. A city of great wealth and influence, it enjoyed voting rights during the royal election period. It was also one of four largest cities of Poland. Sejms of the Polish–Lithuanian Commonwealth were held in Toruń in 1576 and 1626.

In 1557, during the Protestant Reformation, the city adopted Protestantism, while most Polish cities remained Roman Catholic. Despite the Union of Lublin of 1569, which reduced Royal Prussia's autonomy, Thorn retained its status as an autonomous city state under the Polish Crown. Under Mayor Henryk Stroband (1586–1609), the city became centralized. Administrative power passed into the hands of the city council. In 1595 Jesuits arrived to promote the Counter-Reformation, taking control of St. John's Church. The Protestant city officials tried to limit the influx of Catholics into the city, as Catholics (Jesuits and Dominican friars) already controlled most of the churches, leaving only St. Mary's to Protestant citizens. In 1645, at a time when religious conflicts occurred in many other European countries and the disastrous Thirty Years' War was fought west of Poland, in Thorn, on the initiative of King Władysław IV Vasa, a three-month congress of European Catholics, Lutherans and Calvinists was held, known as Colloquium Charitativum, an important event in the history of interreligious dialogue.

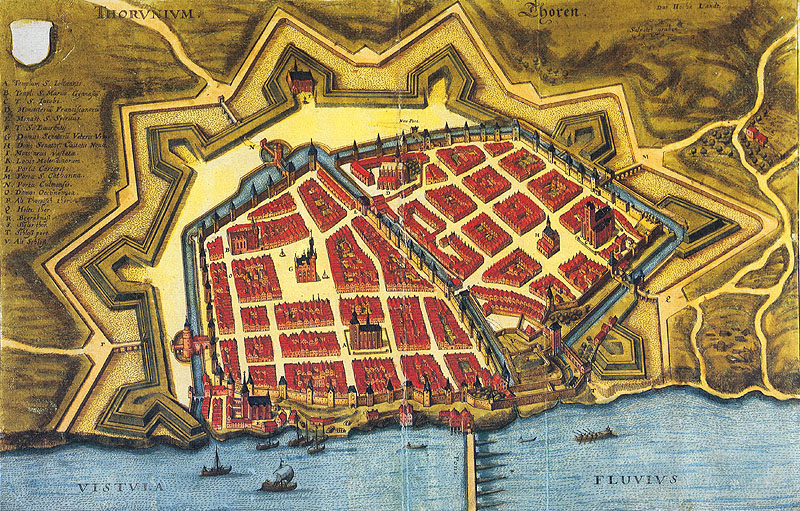
Thorn in the 17th century

In 1677 the Prussian historian and educator Christoph Hartknoch was invited to be director of the Thorn Gymnasium, a post which he held until his death in 1687. Hartknoch wrote histories of Prussia and the cities of the province of Royal Prussia.

During the Great Northern War (1700–21), the city was besieged by Swedish troops. The restoration of Augustus the Strong as King of Poland was prepared in the town in the Treaty of Thorn (1709) by Russian Tsar Peter the Great. In the second half of the 17th century, tensions between Catholics and Protestants grew, similarly to religious wars throughout Europe in the previous century. In the early 18th century about 50 percent of the populace, especially the gentry and middle class, were German-speaking Protestants, while the other 50 percent were Polish speaking Roman Catholics. Protestant influence was subsequently pushed back after the Tumult of Thorn of 1724.

In September 1711, Francis II Rákóczi, Hungarian national hero who found refuge in Poland after the fall of the Rákóczi's War of Independence against Austria, stopped in the city during his travel from Jarosław to Danzig.

== Kingdom of Prussia ==
In 1793 the Kingdom of Prussia annexed the city in the Second Partition of Poland. In 1807 Napoleon conquered part of the territory and made the city part of the newly formed Polish Duchy of Warsaw. Toruń served as the temporary capital of the duchy in April and May 1809. In 1809 Thorn was successfully defended by the Poles against the Austrians. Prussia re-annexed the city after Napoleon's defeat in 1814. Pan Tadeusz, epic poem by Adam Mickiewicz, was first printed in Thorn in 1858. In 1870 French prisoners of war taken during the Franco-Prussian War were directed to build a chain of forts surrounding the town. The following year the city, along with the rest of Prussia, became part of the new German Empire.

Thorn was part of the area subject to Prussian and later German attempts to Germanise the province. Toruń became a centre of resistance to Germanization and Kulturkampf by Poles, who established a Polish-language newspaper, Gazeta Toruńska. In 1875 a Polish Scientific Society was established, and in 1884 a secret organization dedicated to the restoration of Poland. During Prussian and German rule, especially in the second half of the 19th century, the German authorities promoted ethnic German settlement in the city by falsifying census results. To diminish the number of Poles, one method involved counting all bilingual Poles who spoke German as Germans. Additionally, German soldiers stationed in the city were included in census figures as citizens for propaganda purposes. In order to achieve German majority over Polish population in Toruń, German authorities helped settle large numbers of German officials, workers and craftsmen by legal and administrative means. The number of Germans decreased from 27,509 in 1910 to 2,255 in 1926 and further to 2,057 in 1934.

== Interwar Poland ==
In 1918, Poland regained independence, and according to the Treaty of Versailles following World War I in 1919, Toruń was re-assigned to Poland. It became the capital of the Pomeranian Voivodeship.

In 1925, the Baltic Institute was established in the city, and worked on documenting Polish heritage and history in Pomerania. In general, the interwar period was a time of significant urban development in Toruń. Major investments were completed in areas such as transportation (new streets, tramway lines and the Piłsudski Bridge), residential development (many new houses, particularly in Bydgoskie Przedmieście suburb) and public buildings. Following the bridge's construction, in 1938 the nearby town of Podgórz, on the left bank of the Vistula, was incorporated into Toruń.

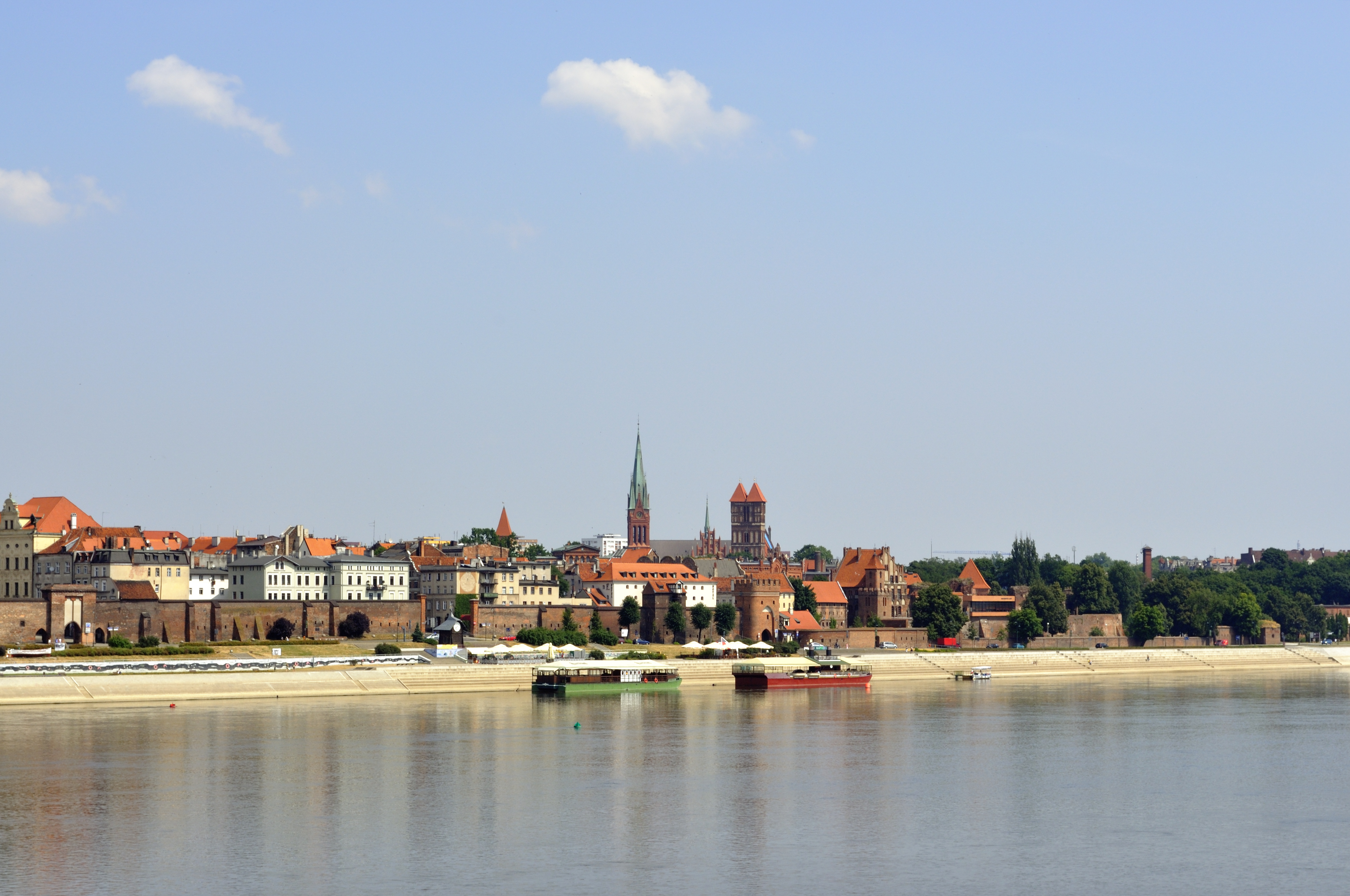
Modern-day Toruń, located on the banks of the Vistula

In 1934 the Polish government abrogated the German-Polish treaty of protection of national minorities which was concluded as part of the Versailles treaties restoring the region and city to Poland.

The Jewish community in Toruń was very active before World War II. Just before the Nazi German invasion of Poland, Jews supported the Polish government fund-raising for Air Defence (Dz.U.R.P.Nr 26, poz. 176) much more generously than average Torunians.

== World War II ==
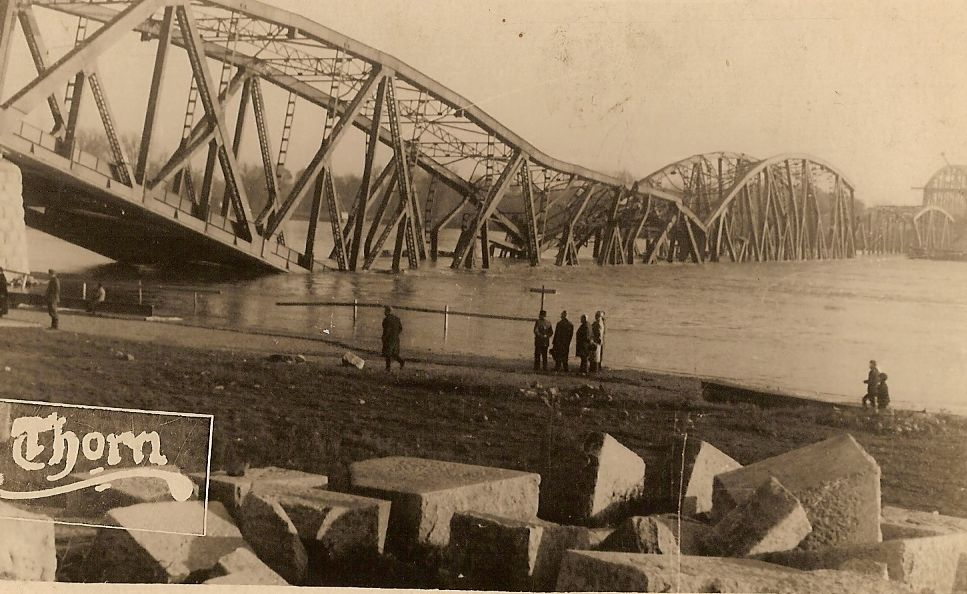
Toruń bridge blown up at the beginning of Second World War

The German army entered the city on 7 September 1939, during the invasion of Poland, which started World War II. Afterwards, the German Einsatzkommando 16 entered the city to commit various crimes against Poles. annexed the city, and administered it as part of Danzig-West Prussia. Poles were classified as Untermenschen by German authorities, with their fate being slave-labor, executions, expulsions and deportations to concentration camps. In October 1939 the new regional gauleiter, Albert Forster, announced in the city that in a few years, not a word of Polish will be spoken here.

A group of Polish railwaymen and policemen from Toruń was murdered by the German gendarmerie and Wehrmacht in Gąbin on 19–21 September 1939. Local Poles, including activists, teachers and priests, arrested in Toruń and the Toruń County from September 1939, were initially held in the pre-war prison, and after its overcrowding, from October 1939, the Germans imprisoned Poles in Fort VII of the Toruń Fortress. Only on 17–19 October 1939, the German police and Selbstschutz arrested 1,200 Poles in Toruń and the county. In early November 1939, the Germans carried out further mass arrests of Polish teachers, farmers and priests in Toruń and the county, who were then imprisoned in Fort VII. Imprisoned Poles were then either deported to concentration camps or murdered on site. Large massacres of over 1,100 Poles from the city and region, including teachers, school principals, local officials, restaurateurs, shop owners, merchants, farmers, railwaymen, policemen, craftsmen, students, priests, workers, doctors, were carried out in the present-day district of Barbarka. Six mass graves were discovered after the war, in five of which the bodies of the victims were burnt, as the Germans tried to cover up the crime. By the end of November 1939 the city was declared Judenfrei, with several hundred Jews who chose to stay, deported to the Łódź Ghetto and other locations in the Warthegau. Local teachers were also among Polish teachers murdered in the Sachsenhausen-Oranienburg, Mauthausen and Dachau concentration camps.

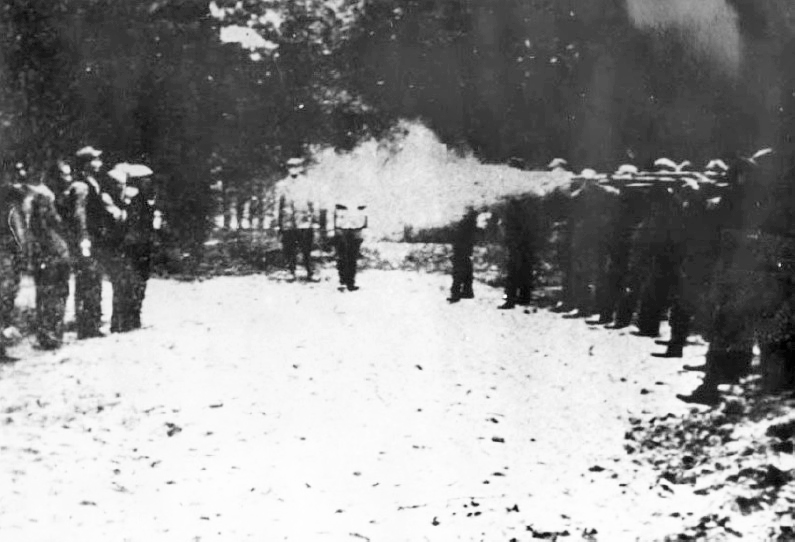
German execution of Poles in Barbarka in 1939

From 1940 to 1943, in the northern part of the city there was a German transit camp (Umsiedlungslager Thorn) for Poles expelled from Toruń and the surrounding area, which became infamous for inhuman sanitary conditions. Over 12,000 Poles passed through the camp, and around 1,000 died there, including about 400 children. After the camp was dissolved, the remaining Polish prisoners were deported to the Potulice concentration camp. From 1941 to 1945, a German forced labour camp was located in the city. In the spring of 1942, the Germans murdered 30 Polish scouts aged 13-16 in Fort VII.

Despite such circumstances, the Polish resistance movement was active in the city, and Toruń was the seat of one of the six main commands of the Union of Armed Struggle in occupied Poland (alongside Warsaw, Kraków, Poznań, Białystok and Lwów). From 1941, underground Polish press smuggled from Nasielsk and Warsaw was distributed in Toruń. One of the main transfer points for underground Polish press smuggled to German-occupied Pomerania was based in Toruń, and from January 1945 the underground Polish newspaper Strażnica Bałtyku was published in the city itself. Polish intelligence infiltrated various branches of the German arms industry.

During World War II, the Germans used the chain of forts surrounding the city as prisoner-of-war camps, known collectively as Stalag XX-A. Polish, British, French, Australian and Soviet POWs were held in the camp and forced labour subcamps in the region. There were disastrous sanitary conditions and prevalent epidemics in the overcrowded camp, as a result of which many prisoners died. The city escaped significant destruction during the war. In 1945 it was taken by the Soviet Red Army. The remaining ethnic German population was expelled in accordance with the Potsdam Agreement, primarily to East Germany, between 1945 and 1947.

== Post-war history ==
After World War II, the population increased more than twofold and industry developed significantly. The founding of the Nicolaus Copernicus University in 1945 was significant. Over the years, it has become one of the best universities in Poland. The university has strongly influenced the intellectual, artistic and cultural life of the city, as well as its perception by non-locals. The university was founded by Polish professors formerly associated with the University of Wilno. After the war, they were forced to leave former eastern Poland, which was annexed by the Soviet Union, and settle in post-1945 Poland.

Year	Population	Remarks
1768	approx. 1,000	
1793	5,570	(cit: Historia Torunia)
1806	8,954	
1815	7,095	
1828	11,265	
1831	8,631	(cit: Preußische Landes 1835)
1864	14,106	without German military: 2,111
1875	18,631	(cit: Deutschen Reichs 1903–15)
1880	20,617	(cit: Deutschen Reichs 1903–15)
1885	23,906	(cit: Deutschen Reichs 1903–15)
1890	27,018	(cit: Deutschen Reichs 1903–15)
1900	29,635	(cit: Deutschen Reichs 1903–15)
1906	43,435	including German military
1910	46,227	(cit: Deutschen Reichs 1903–15)
1931	54,280	(cit: GUS)
1943	78,224	
2009	205,934	(cit: GUS)

Since 1989, when local and regional self-government was gradually reintroduced and the market economy was introduced, Toruń, like other cities in Poland, has undergone deep social and economic transformations. Locals debate whether the changes have been as successful as they had hoped for, but Toruń has recently reclaimed its strong position as a regional leader, together with Bydgoszcz. Bydgoszcz–Toruń rivalry has existed for centuries.

In 1992, by a papal bull of John Paul II, the Roman Catholic Diocese of Toruń was established as a successor to the former Diocese of Chełmno, founded in 1243.

In 1997, the historic city center of Toruń was designated a UNESCO World Heritage Site, and in 2007 it was named one of the Seven Wonders of Poland.

On 7 June 1999 Toruń was visited by Pope John Paul II. The Pope first met at the Nicolaus Copernicus University with some 1,200 academic and cultural figures from 200 various Polish universities and colleges, and afterwards celebrated a mass for some 300,000 people. During the mass, the Pope beatified Stefan Wincenty Frelichowski, a Polish priest from Toruń and prisoner of German concentration camps during World War II, who died in Dachau of typhus contracted while providing aid to sick fellow prisoners.

In 2008, the 12999 Toruń asteroid was named after the city.

== Bibliography ==
- Górski, Karol (1949). Związek Pruski i poddanie się Prus Polsce: zbiór tekstów źródłowych (in Polish). Poznań: Instytut Zachodni.
- Wardzyńska, Maria (2009). Był rok 1939. Operacja niemieckiej policji bezpieczeństwa w Polsce. Intelligenzaktion (in Polish). Warszawa: IPN.
- Chrzanowski, Bogdan (2022). Polskie Państwo Podziemne na Pomorzu w latach 1939–1945 (in Polish). Gdańsk: IPN. ISBN 978-83-8229-411-8.
