= List of World Heritage Sites in Poland =

Location of UNESCO World Heritage Sites in Poland. Blue dots indicate the sites of Wooden Churches of Southern Lesser Poland, green dots the Wooden Tserkvas of Carpathian Region in Poland and Ukraine, and the two grey dots the Churches of Peace.

The United Nations Educational, Scientific and Cultural Organization (UNESCO) World Heritage Sites are places of importance to cultural or natural heritage as described in the UNESCO World Heritage Convention, established in 1972. Cultural heritage consists of monuments (such as architectural works, monumental sculptures, or inscriptions), groups of buildings, and sites (including archaeological sites). Natural heritage consists of natural features (physical and biological formations), geological and physiographical formations (including habitats of threatened species of animals and plants), and natural sites which are important from the point of view of science, conservation, or natural beauty. Poland ratified the convention on 29 June 1976, making its historical sites eligible for inclusion on the list.

As of 2026, there are 18 World Heritages Sites in Poland, 16 of which are cultural, and two are natural sites. The first two sites inscribed on the World Heritage List were Wieliczka Salt Mine and Historic Centre of Kraków, in 1978. The most recent addition is the Gdynia Modernist City Centre, listed in July 2026. Four of the sites are transnational. The Białowieża Forest is shared with Belarus, the Wooden Tserkvas of Carpathian Region with Ukraine, the Muskauer Park / Park Mużakowski with Germany and the Primeval Beech Forests is shared among 18 European countries. In addition, there are six sites on the tentative list.

== World Heritage Sites ==
UNESCO lists sites under ten criteria; each entry must meet at least one of the criteria. Criteria i through vi are cultural, and vii through x are natural.

* Transnational site

World Heritage Sites
Site	Image	Location (voivodeship)	Year listed	UNESCO data	Description
Historic Centre of Kraków	Krakow main square from above	Lesser Poland	1978	29bis; iv (cultural)	The city of Kraków, chartered in 1257, is the old capital of Poland. The historic centre encompasses three urban ensembles, the medieval City of Kraków, the Wawel Hill complex (the royal residence together with the Wawel Cathedral where several kings of Poland are buried), and the town of Kazimierz, including the suburb of Stradom, which was shaped by Catholic and Jewish residents. Kraków was a city of arts and crafts, a meeting place of East and West. The city retains a high level of integrity and includes buildings and features in styles from the early Romanesque to the Modernist periods. A minor boundary modification of the site took place in 2010.
Wieliczka and Bochnia Royal Salt Mines	Underground hall from above, chandeliers and tourists	Lesser Poland	1978	32ter; iv (cultural)	The areas around Wieliczka and Bochnia contain deposits of rock salt, which has been mined since the 13th century. Hundreds of kilometres of tunnels in both mines also contain works of art, such as sculptures carved in salt and underground chapels. The mines illustrate the development of mining technologies in Europe. Wieliczka was first listed individually in 1978. Eleven years later, it was added to the list of World Heritage in Danger due to the threats posed to the sculptures by the humidity. Following a conservation program that saw the installation of efficient dehumidifying equipment in the mine, it was removed from the endangered list in 1998. A minor boundary modification took place in 2008. The Bochnia Mine was added in 2013.
Auschwitz Birkenau, German Nazi Concentration and Extermination Camp (1940–1945)	Entrance gate in red brick and railway tracks	Lesser Poland	1979	31; vi (cultural)	Auschwitz was a network of Nazi concentration and extermination camps built and operated by the Third Reich in Polish areas annexed by Nazi Germany during World War II. It was the largest of the German concentration camps. The World Heritage Site covers Auschwitz I (the base camp), Auschwitz II–Birkenau (the extermination camp), and a mass grave of inmates. The site was originally listed as "Auschwitz Concentration Camp", but upon Poland's request renamed as "Auschwitz Birkenau" with the subtitle of "German Nazi Concentration and Extermination Camp (1940–1945)"
Białowieża Forest*	Three grazing European bison	Podlaskie	1979	33; vii (natural)	Białowieża Forest is a large forest complex, including extensive old-growth forests, on the border between Poland and Belarus. It is an example of the Central European mixed forests terrestrial ecoregion, and a range of associated non-forest habitats, including wet meadows, river valleys, and other wetlands. The area is home to the largest free-roaming population of European bison, as well as wolf, lynx, and otter. The Polish part of the site was first added to the list in 1979. The part in Belarus, Belovezhskaya Pushcha, was added in 1992, while the year 2014 saw a large extension of the protected area.
Historic Centre of Warsaw	Market square, colourful houses in the background, tourists in restaurants in front	Masovia	1980	30; ii, vi (cultural)	Warsaw, the capital of Poland, was deliberately demolished by Nazi troops following the Warsaw Uprising in 1944. More than 85% of the historic centre was destroyed. After the war, a five-year restoration campaign took place, and it resulted in a meticulous restoration of the Old Town. The reconstruction process continued in the 1960s and concluded with the opening of the Royal Castle to visitors in 1984.
Old City of Zamość	A row of colourful houses	Lublin	1992	564; iv (cultural)	Zamość was founded in the 16th century by Jan Zamoyski. Designed by the architect Bernardo Morando of Padua, it is a perfect example of a late-Renaissance town. The original town layout has been preserved, as well as the fortifications and several buildings that blend the architectural influences from Italy with those from Central Europe.
Castle of the Teutonic Order in Malbork	Front view of a castle tower in red brick	Pomerania	1997	847; ii, iii, iv (cultural)	Malbork Castle was built by the Teutonic Knights, a German Roman Catholic religious order of crusaders, after the seat of the Grand Master was moved to Malbork from Venice in 1309. The castle is a classic example of a medieval castle in Brick Gothic style. It was damaged during World War II but later carefully restored.
Medieval Town of Toruń	Red brick gothic town hall, tourists around	Kuyavia-Pomerania	1997	835; ii, iv (cultural)	Toruń was founded by the Teutonic Knights who built a castle there in the mid-13th century, as a base for evangelisation of Prussia. It was later a member of the Hanseatic League and an important trading post between the Baltic area and Eastern Europe. The medieval town has been well preserved, including several important houses in Brick Gothic style, such as the home of the mathematician and astronomer Nicolaus Copernicus.
Kalwaria Zebrzydowska: the Mannerist Architectural and Park Landscape Complex and Pilgrimage Park	Church with white walls, red roof and copper-covered domes	Lesser Poland	1999	905; ii, iv (cultural)	The religious complex (a calvary) was founded by the voivode of Kraków Mikołaj Zebrzydowski in the early 1600s. It consists of a monastery and a number of churches, chapels and shrines that were built in the Mannerist style. It is an outstanding example of calvary shrines in the Counter-Reformation period. Virtually unchanged since the construction, it remains an active pilgrimage site in the 21st century.
Churches of Peace in Jawor and Świdnica	Interior view of a church, richly decorated wooden details	Lower Silesia	2001	1054; ii, iv, vi (cultural)	The Churches of Peace in Jawor and Świdnica in Silesia were named after the Peace of Westphalia of 1648 which permitted the Lutherans in the Roman Catholic parts of Silesia to build three Evangelical churches from wood and clay outside the city walls. The conditions were also that the churches should not feature a tower and that their construction was to be completed within one year. The third church was built in Głogów in 1652, but burned down a century later.
Wooden Churches of Southern Lesser Poland	Wooden church with a small spire, surrounded by trees	Lesser Poland	2003	1053; iii, iv (cultural)	The six churches (Church of the Archangel Michael (Binarowa), Church of All Saints (Blizne), Church of the Archangel Michael (Dębno), Church of the Assumption of the Blessed Virgin Mary and the Archangel Michael (Haczów), Church of St Leonard (Lipnica Murowana), Church of St Philip and St James the Apostles (Sękowa)) represent the best preserved and the oldest wooden churches in the region. They were built in the Gothic style, but are different from the contemporary stone or brick buildings in the cities. These churches were sponsored by noble families and are richly decorated.
Muskauer Park / Park Mużakowski*	Red castle, pond in front	Lubusz	2004	1127; i, iv (cultural)	The park is set along the banks of the Neisse River and is shared by Poland and Germany. It was created by Prince Hermann von Puckler-Muskau from 1815 to 1844, using local plants and natural settings. The park design influenced the development of the landscape architecture profession. Sustaining severe damage during World War II, it has been since restored in both countries.
Centennial Hall in Wrocław	Large concrete dome with an open space in front	Lower Silesia	2006	1165; i, ii, iv (cultural)	The Centennial Hall is an early Modernist building made of reinforced concrete. It was designed by Max Berg as a multifunctional venue to serve as an exhibition ground or an assembly hall and to host sport events, concerts, and theatre performances. Built in 1911–1913, it had the largest reinforced concrete dome in the world at the time of its construction. It served as a reference point for later buildings constructed of this material.
Wooden Tserkvas of the Carpathian Region in Poland and Ukraine*	Wooden church surrounded by trees	Lesser Poland, Subcarpathia	2013	1424; iii, iv (cultural)	This property comprises 16 wooden churches (tserkvas) in the Carpathians, half of which are in Poland and the rest in Ukraine. The churches were built between the 16th and 19th centuries by the communities of Eastern Orthodox and Greek Catholic faiths. The designs are based on the Orthodox ecclesiastical traditions with local influences. They feature wooden bell towers, iconostasis screens, and interior polychrome decorations, as well as churchyards, gatehouses, and graveyards. The St. Michael Archangel's Church in Smolnik is pictured.
Tarnowskie Góry Lead-Silver-Zinc Mine and its Underground Water Management System	Mine shaft with two figures representing miners	Silesia	2017	1539; i, ii, iv (cultural)	This historic lead, silver, and zinc mine is located in the Tarnowskie Góry. Due to its location on a plateau, it had substantial problems with water drainage as opposed to mines that are located in mountainous terrains. In over 300 years of the mine's operation, different techniques have been employed to remove the water from the tunnels, including steam-powered pumps in the 19th century.
Krzemionki Prehistoric Striped Flint Mining Region	Mine shaft, artificial light	Świętokrzyskie	2019	1599; iii, iv (cultural)	Krzemionki is an ensemble of four striped flint mines from the Neolithic and early Bronze Age periods (about 3900 to 1600 BCE). Flint was mostly used to make axes. Over 4000 shafts and pits, as well as flint workshops have been found in one of the most comprehensive prehistoric underground flint extraction and processing systems identified to date.
Ancient and Primeval Beech Forests of the Carpathians and Other Regions of Europe*	Foggy forest	Subcarpathia	2021	1133; ix (natural)	This site comprises forests in 18 European countries. These forests demonstrate the postglacial expansion process of European beech forests and exhibit the most complete and comprehensive ecological patterns and processes of pure and mixed stands of European beech across a variety of environmental conditions. The site was first listed in 2007 and subsequently extended in 2011, 2017, and 2021 to include forests in several other countries. The Bieszczady National Park in Poland has been added to the list in 2021.
Gdynia Modernist City Centre	White building in modernist style in the back, waterfront with sailing boats in front	Pomerania	2026	1715; iv (cultural)	After World War I, the newly independent Poland gained a narrow stretch of Baltic coastline. Lacking a port that matched its economic needs and international ambitions, the government chose the village of Gdynia, just north of the Free City of Danzig, and transformed it into Poland's primary maritime hub. Gdynia's modernist city centre, laid out along two major axes and featuring distinctive architecture inspired by Streamline Moderne and Functionalism, was built mainly in the 1920s and 1930s. During this period, the population grew from 1,200 to 120,000, and the city became a symbol of the modernisation of the Polish state.

== Tentative list ==
In addition to sites inscribed on the World Heritage List, member states can maintain a list of tentative sites that they may consider for nomination. Nominations for the World Heritage List are only accepted if the site was previously listed on the tentative list. Poland lists six properties on its tentative list.

Tentative sites
Site	Image	Location (voivodeship)	Year listed	UNESCO criteria	Description
The Dunajec River Gorge in the Pieniny Mountains	River gorge, surrounded by tree-covered mountains	Lesser Poland	2006	(natural)	The Dunajec River Gorge in the Pieniny National Park is rich in flora and fauna. As the Pieniny Mountains were not glaciated, the site can be used to study the evolution of vegetation since the Last Glacial Maximum.
European Paper Mills (from the era of hand-made paper)*	Red museum building with a dark wooden roof, surrounded by a fence	Lower Silesia	2024	ii, iii, iv (cultural)	This transnational nomination comprises six 16th–18th century paper mills that show the importance of Europe in paper production. The Duszniki-Zdrój Paper Mill is nominated in Poland, which was previously an individual tentative site (2019–2024).
Historical coal-mining complex in Zabrze (eighteenth–twentieth centuries)	Historical black and white photograph of coal mine buildings from outside	Silesia	2025	ii, iii, iv (cultural)	The nomination comprises three sites with former anthracite (or hard coal) mines. Industrial mining started in the late 18th century and concluded in the late 20th century. The Queen Louise Mine (historical photograph pictured) was converted to a museum in 1993. The sites demonstrate the technological development associated with coal mining, as well as associated cultural traditions of miners and other people involved with the mines.
Historic Saltworks Complex in Ciechocinek	Graduation tower	Kuyavian–Pomeranian	2025	ii, iii (cultural)	The nomination comprises a complete ensemble of production facilities where the traditional process of salt boiling is still carried out using historical equipment and technologies that have been in use since the 1830s, and in its current form since the early 20th century. The most distinctive elements of the complex and production process are the three graduation towers and Salt Boiling Facility, in which the final stage of salt production takes place.
The early modern Srebrna Góra Fortress as a perfect example of mountain massifs transformation	Aerial view of the Srebrna Góra Fortress	Lower Silesia	2025	ii, iii, iv (cultural)	The Srebrna Góra Fortress, constructed between 1765 and 1785, is the largest mountain fortress in Europe in terms of the extent of its defensive lines and the transformation of some 60 hectares of mountainous terrain. It represents a key stage in the evolution of early modern mountain fortifications and was built by the Kingdom of Prussia in response to regional geopolitical tensions, serving as part of the defence system of Silesia along the border between Prussia and the Habsburg Empire.
Bóbrka oil field – the heritage of the beginnings of the oil industry in the world	Mid-19th-century dug shaft in the Bóbrka oil field	Subcarpathia	2025	ii, iii, iv (cultural)	The Bóbrka oil field is the birthplace of the world's oil mining industry, where systematic extraction began in 1854 and has continued uninterrupted to the present day. Today, it forms part of the Ignacy Łukasiewicz Oil and Gas Industry Museum, which preserves historic buildings, equipment, and infrastructure within a forested landscape setting. The open-air museum displays equipment dating from the mid-19th century to the 1990s. Exhibits include: (1) original 19th-century buildings, mining shafts, and equipment preserved in situ; (2) reconstructions based on historical engravings, accounts, and textbooks; and (3) 20th-century equipment transferred to the museum during the creation of the exhibition.

== See also ==
- List of Historic Monuments in Poland
- Seven Wonders of Poland
- Tourism in Poland
- UNESCO Memory of the World Register
