= Toruń Castle =

Castle in Poland

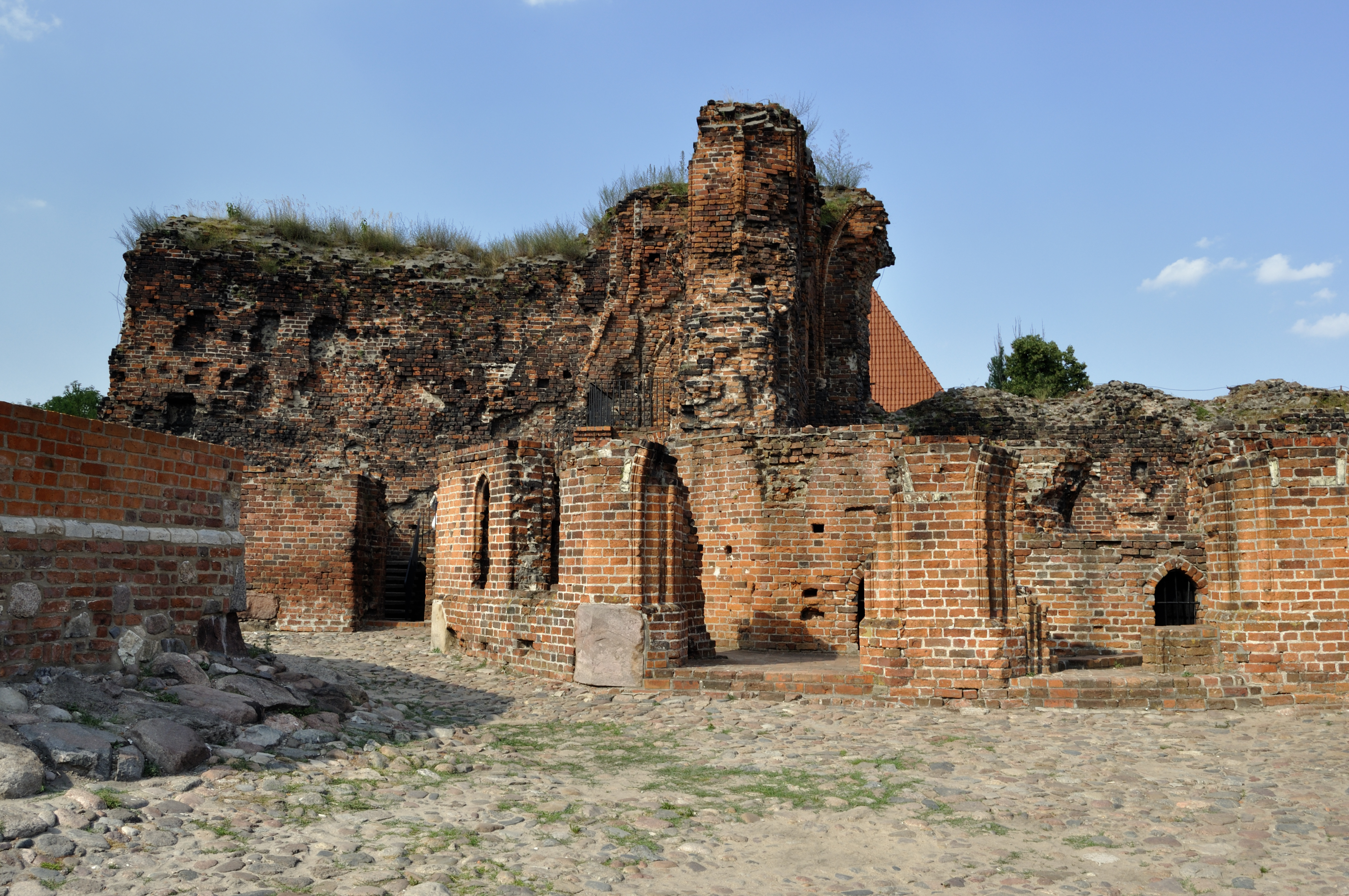
- Ruins of the Toruń Castle today

- Location within Poland
- 53°00′34″N 18°36′39″E
- Location: Toruń, Poland

History
- Built: 13th or 14th century

Site notes
- Architectural style: Gothic

UNESCO World Heritage Site
- Type: Cultural
- Criteria: ii, iv
- Designated: 1997
- Part of: Medieval Town of Toruń
- Reference no.: 835
- UNESCO region: Europe

Historic Monument of Poland
- Designated: 1994-09-08
- Part of: Toruń – Old and New Town
- Reference no.: M.P. z 1994 r. Nr 50, poz. 422

Toruń Castle is a 13th- or 14th-century castle of the Teutonic Order located in Toruń, Poland. The castle is part of the Medieval Town of Toruń, one of the World Heritage Sites in Poland and Historic Monuments of Poland.

== History ==
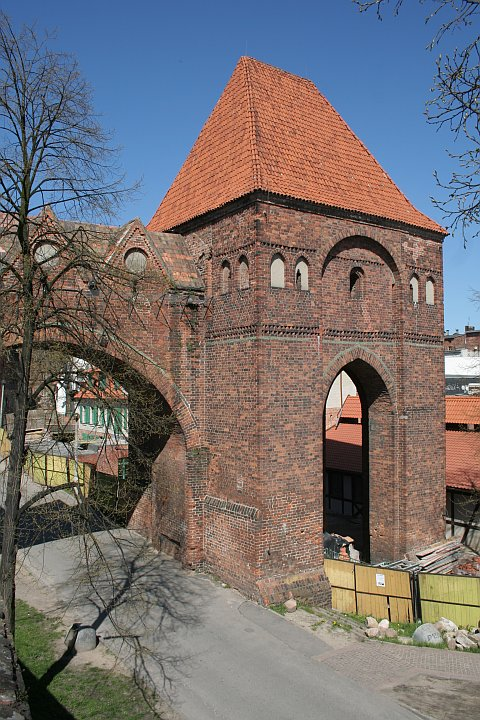
The garderobe tower of the Toruń Castle

Map showing the location of the Toruń Castle in the medieval Toruń neighbourghood

The Toruń Castle was one of the first castles built by the order in the territory enfeoffed to them by Duke Konrad I of Masovia. The construction started in the mid 13th century, and continued for about a hundred years. It was the first Teutonic castle in the Chełmno Land. The new town of Toruń grew together with the Teutonic fortifications protecting it. The palace's historic value comes from the fact that it was the base for the Teutonic Knights when they began their first mission to colonize pagan Old Prussians, and subsequently the formation of the Teutonic state. The castle's first known function was as the residence of a Teutonic commander.

Little of the castle survives to the present day, as it has been demolished in centuries since, with much destruction occurring during a town rebellion in 1454. The city rebelled on 4 February, and a few days later the small Teutonic garrison negotiated a surrender; they were allowed to leave the castle and the city. Shortly afterward, on 8 February, the castle was plundered, and then the Toruń city council decided that it would be demolished to prevent the Teutonic Knights from reoccupying it. This event marked the beginning of the Thirteen Years' War (1454–66).

The castle was partially excavated, rebuilt and turned into an historical monument in 1966 during the time of the People's Republic of Poland for the 500th anniversary of the Second Peace of Thorn.

== Architecture ==
Unlike most later Teutonic castles, it was not a four-winged, rectangular conventional castle; instead it had only two wings, laid out in a pattern similar to that of a horseshoe.

The largest section of the castle to survive to present day is the garderobe tower (dansker). The tower is located over a stream that joins the nearby Vistula river.

The other section of the former castle remaining today are the cellars. Other sections of the former castle now function as permanent exhibits. The permanent exhibits, which are mostly in the palace's vaults, are displayed in settings such as the armoury, kitchen, dormitory, scriptorium, and the mint.

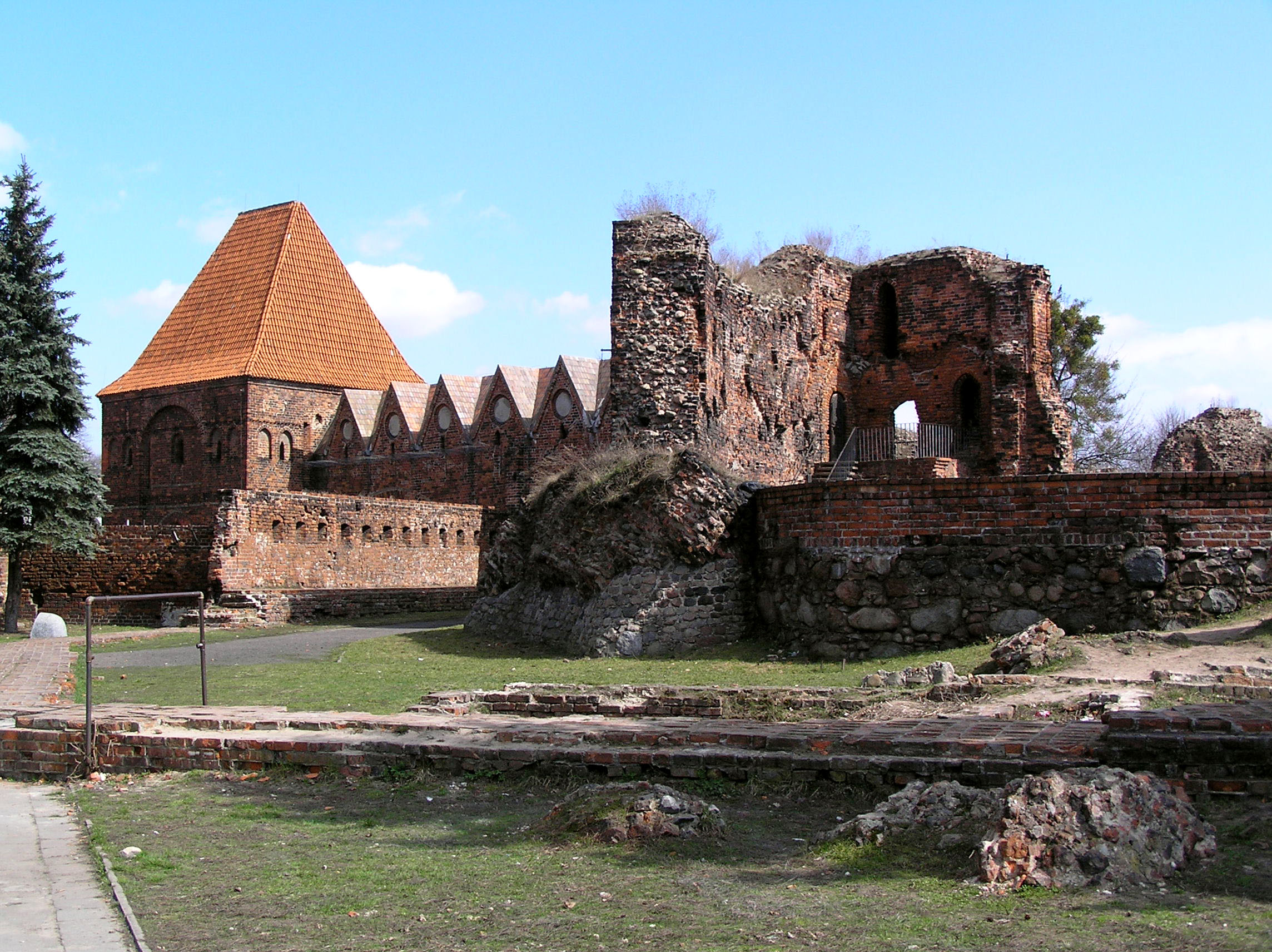
Ruins of the Toruń Castle

== See also ==
- History of Toruń
- Ordensburg
- District Museum in Toruń
