= Crane Tower =

- Baszta Żuraw
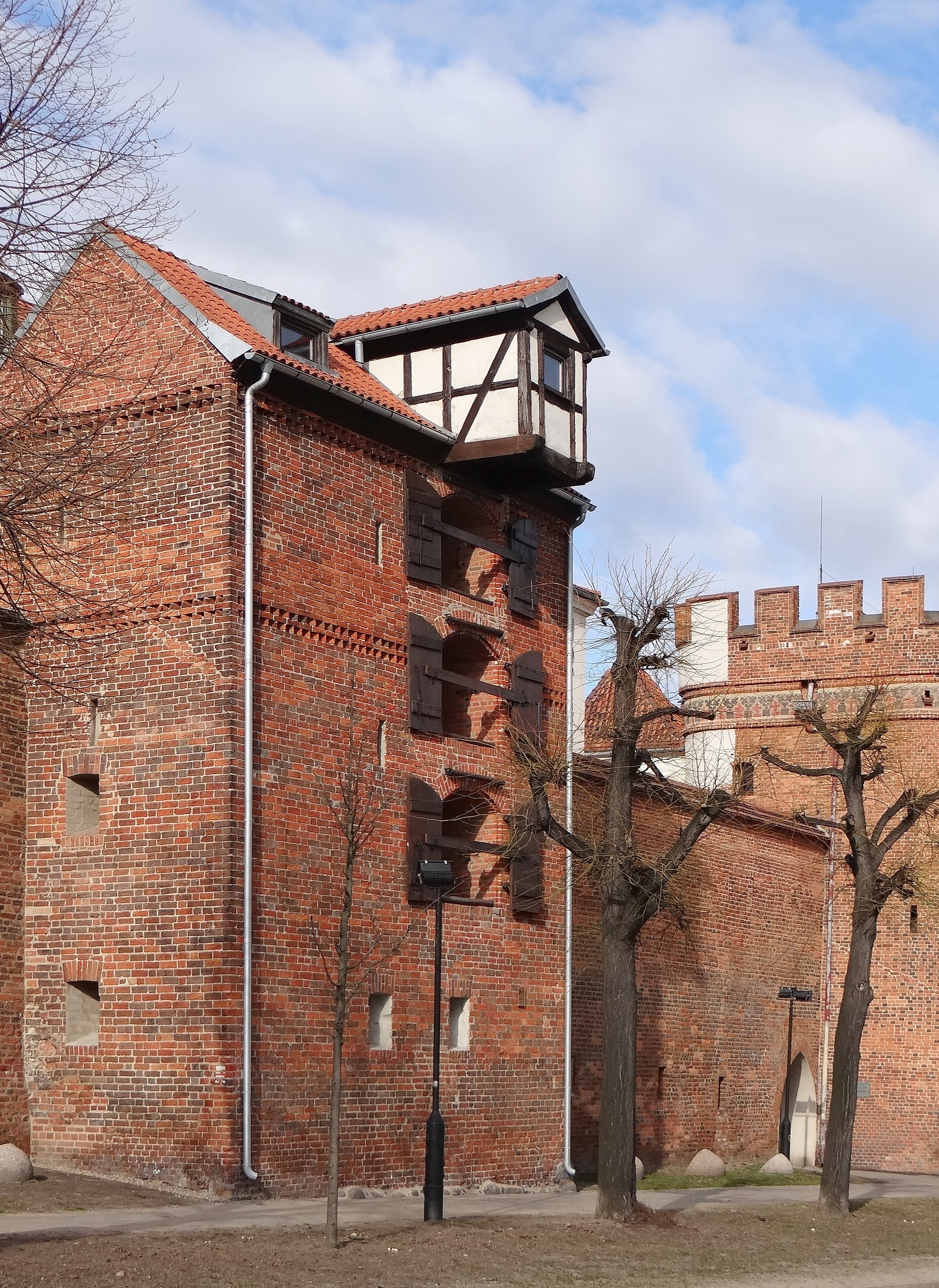
- Crane Tower seen from the southwest

- Location within Poland

General information
- Type: Fortified tower
- Architectural style: Gothic
- Location: Toruń, Poland
- Coordinates: 53.0085°N 18.6085°E
- Completed: 13th century

Height
- Height: c. 14 meters

Technical details
- Material: Brick

UNESCO World Heritage Site
- Type: Cultural
- Criteria: ii, iv
- Designated: 1997
- Part of: Medieval Town of Toruń
- Reference no.: 835
- UNESCO region: Europe

Historic Monument of Poland
- Designated: 8 September 1994
- Part of: Toruń – Old and New Town
- Reference no.: M.P. z 1994 r. Nr 50, poz. 422

Crane Tower (Polish: Baszta Żuraw) is one of the nine remaining defensive towers within the city walls of Toruń, Poland.

== Location ==
The tower is located in the southern part of the Old Town Complex, at 3 Philadelphia Boulevard, to the west of the Bridge Gate (pol. Brama Mostowa).

== History ==
The tower was built around the end of the 13th century. Its name comes from its function. In 1823 it was extended and connected to the Swedish Granary at 1 Mostowa Street, located behind it.

== Architecture ==
The tower was built on a quadrilateral plan, using the Vendian brickwork. Following the 19th century reconstruction, it has four storeys and a usable attic; the original division into storeys was different, demonstrated by Gothic brick friezes laid diagonally. There are 19th century shooting ranges adapted to firearms on the ground floor. The upper floors have large openings closed in sections with wooden shutters. The attic floor houses a wooden crane, with a preserved mechanism. On the northern side, the tower is connected to the building at 1 Mostowa Street (the so-called Swedish Granary, now the Granary Hotel) with a suspended passageway of skeleton structure, with plastered fillings. The tower is currently covered with a gable roof.

== Gallery ==
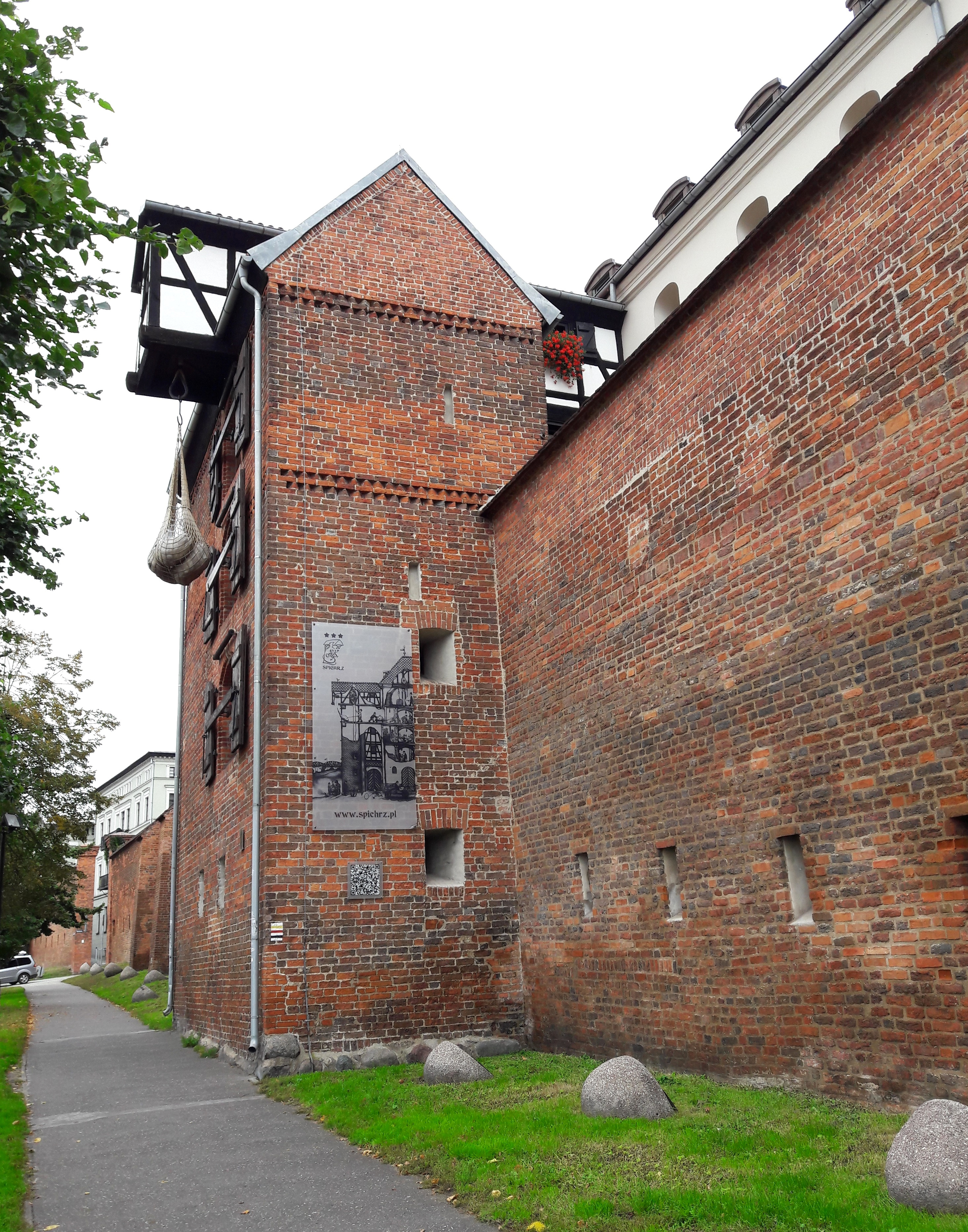
View from the east

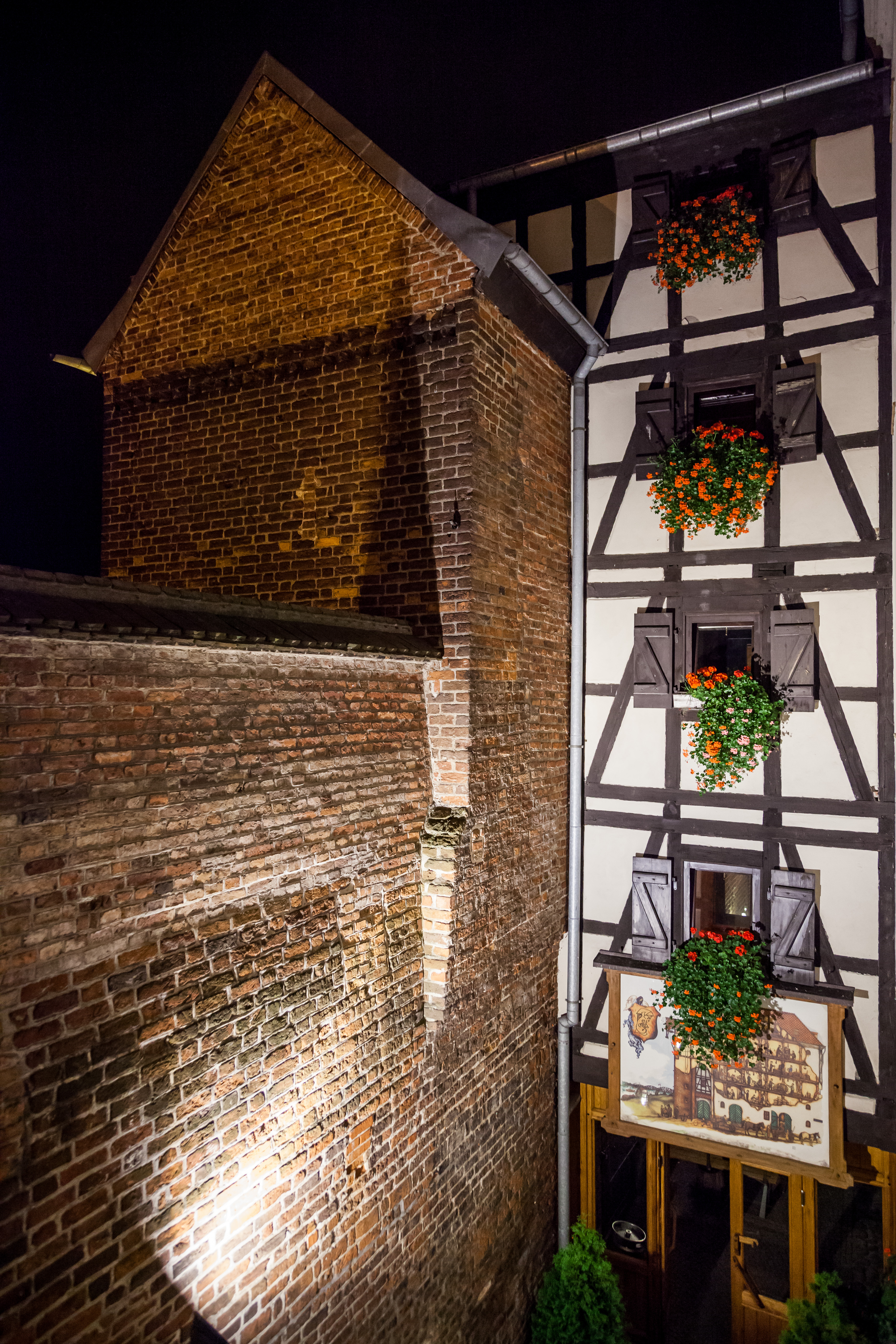
View from the Granary Hotel overlooking the tower and the 19th century passageway

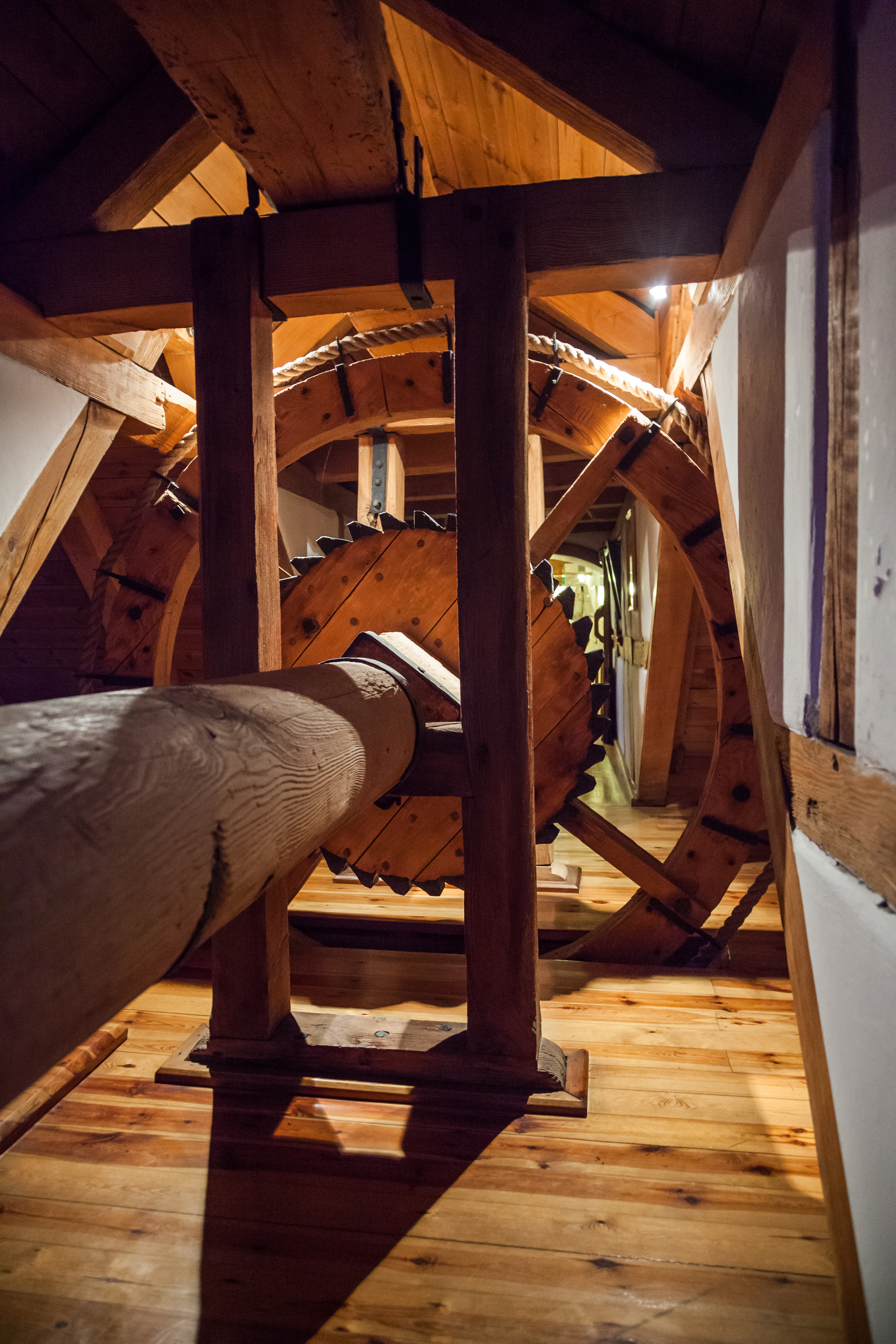
Wooden crane

== Sources ==
- Baszta Żuraw – zabytek.pl (pol.)
- Baszta Żuraw – turystyka.torun.pl (pol.)
