= Copernicus House =

Gothic house in Poland, Copernicus's birthplace

- Dom Kopernika
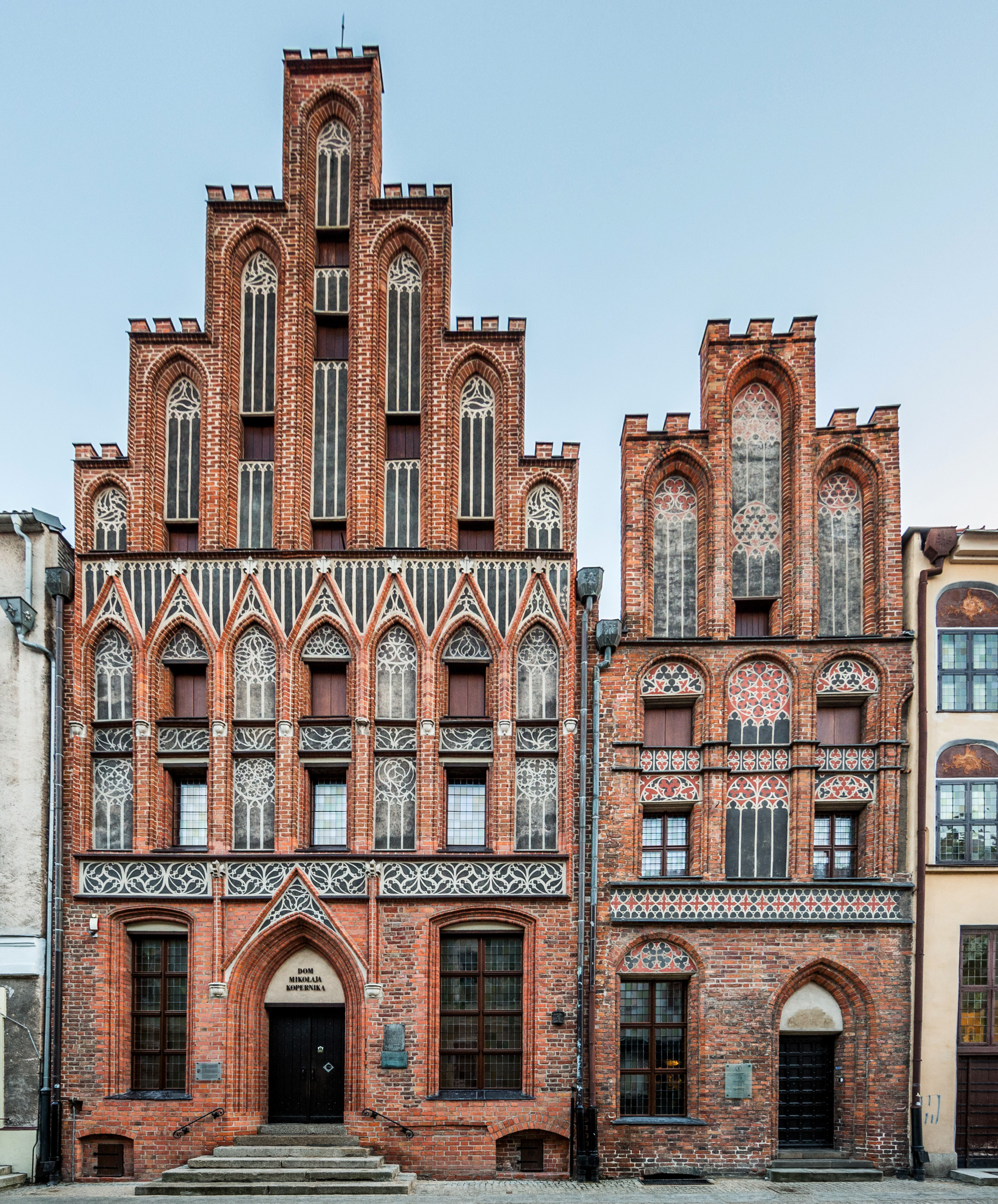
- Tenement house facades

General information
- Architectural style: Gothic
- Location: Toruń, Poland

Technical details
- Material: Brick

UNESCO World Heritage Site
- Type: Cultural
- Criteria: ii, iv
- Designated: 1997
- Part of: Medieval Town of Toruń
- Reference no.: 835

Historic Monument of Poland
- Designated: 8 September 1994
- Part of: Toruń – Old and New Town
- Reference no.: M.P. z 1994 r. Nr 50, poz. 422

The Copernicus House is a historic, Gothic tenement house in Toruń, Poland, which belonged to the Copernicus family in the second half of the 15th century. It is considered by many historians to be the birthplace of Nicolaus Copernicus, and it houses a museum dedicated to the astronomer.

== Location ==
The tenement house is located in the southern part of the Old Town, at 15/17 Kopernika Street.

== History ==
The tenement house dates back to 1370 and is what was called a granary house, which in the Middle Ages performed both residential and storage functions.

At the end of the 14th century, the cloth merchant Herbord Platte became the owner of the house. In 1459, Lucas I Watzenrode, Nicolaus Copernicus' grandfather, took over the house from his nephew, Szymon Falbrecht, and soon gave it to his daughter Barbara Watzenrode and her spouse, Nicolaus Copernicus senior. Many historians point to this building as the place where Nicolaus Copernicus was born in 1473. In 1480 the Copernicus family sold the building to Georg Polnische.

In the nineteenth century, the building was adapted for rental apartments. At that time, its interiors were rebuilt and the facade was plastered.

In 1929 the house was entered in the register of monuments for the first time. It was put on this list again in 1970.

The tenement house was renovated between 1972 and 1973. During the works, its former spatial layout was restored, reconstructing, among others, a tall vestibule with a kitchen corner, a staircase and a wooden suspended room (ground floor). Renovation also included the building's façade decorated with a sharp-edged portal, brick friezes and vertical recesses decorated with traceries.

Since 1973 the building houses the Nicolaus Copernicus Museum.

== Interesting facts ==
- Copernicus Street used to be called St. Anna Street.
- On June 1, 1971, the Polish Post issued a postage stamp depicting the Copernicus House in Toruń with the face value of 40 gr, in the series "Na szlaku Kopernika" (on Copernicus' trail). Offset printing on chalk paper. Andrzej Heidrich was the designer of the stamp. It remained in circulation until December 31, 1994.

== Gallery ==
Interior of the building before renovation:

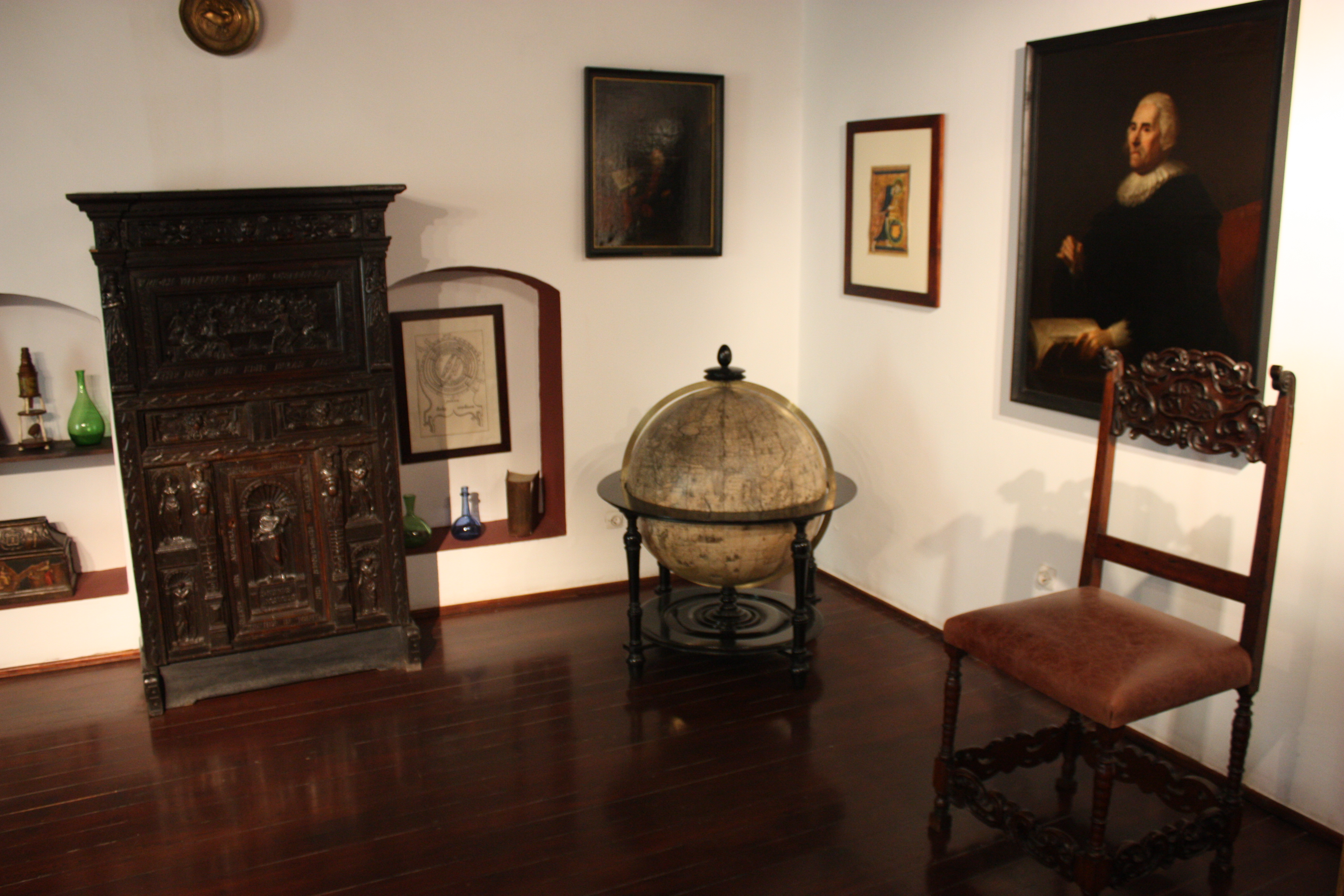

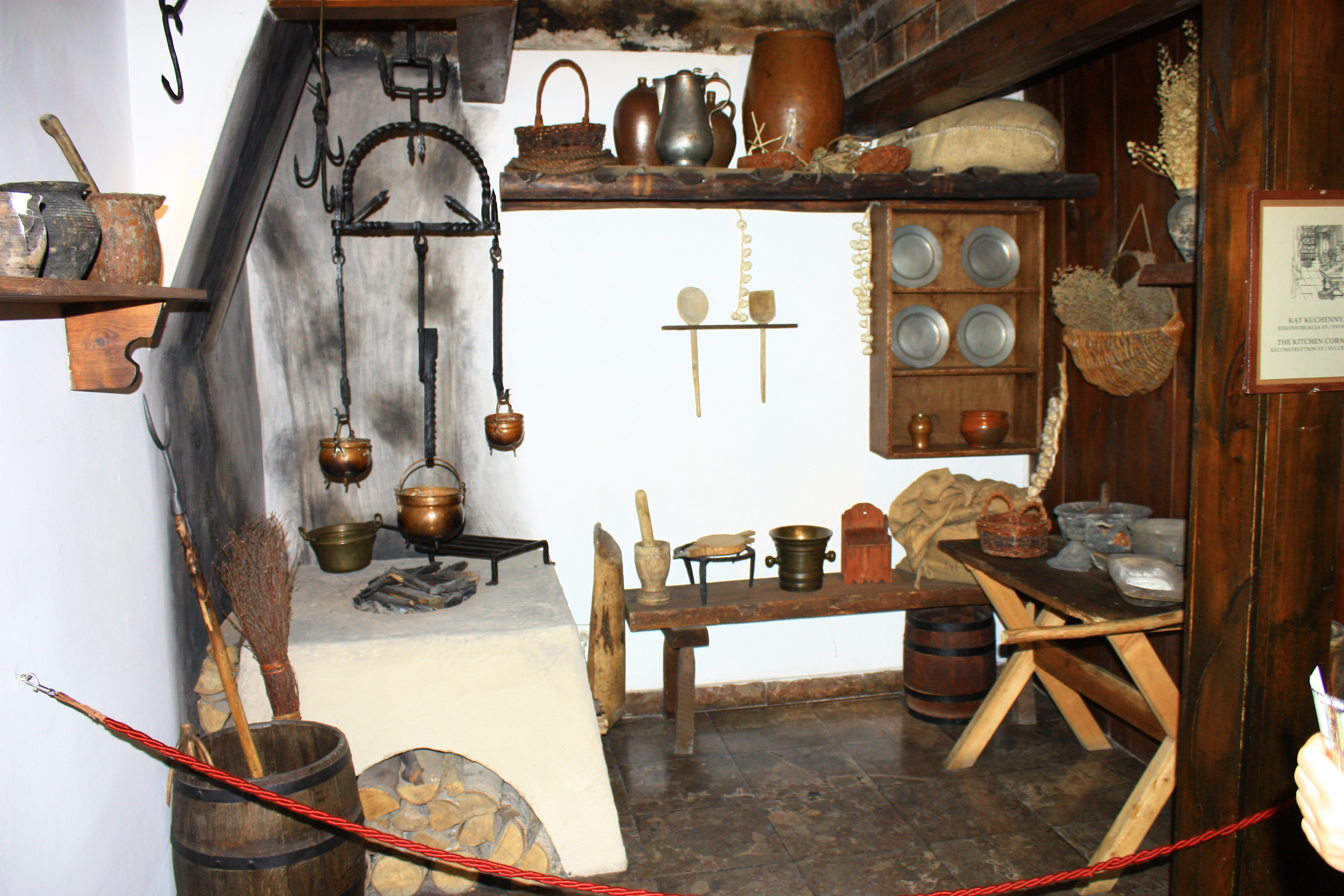

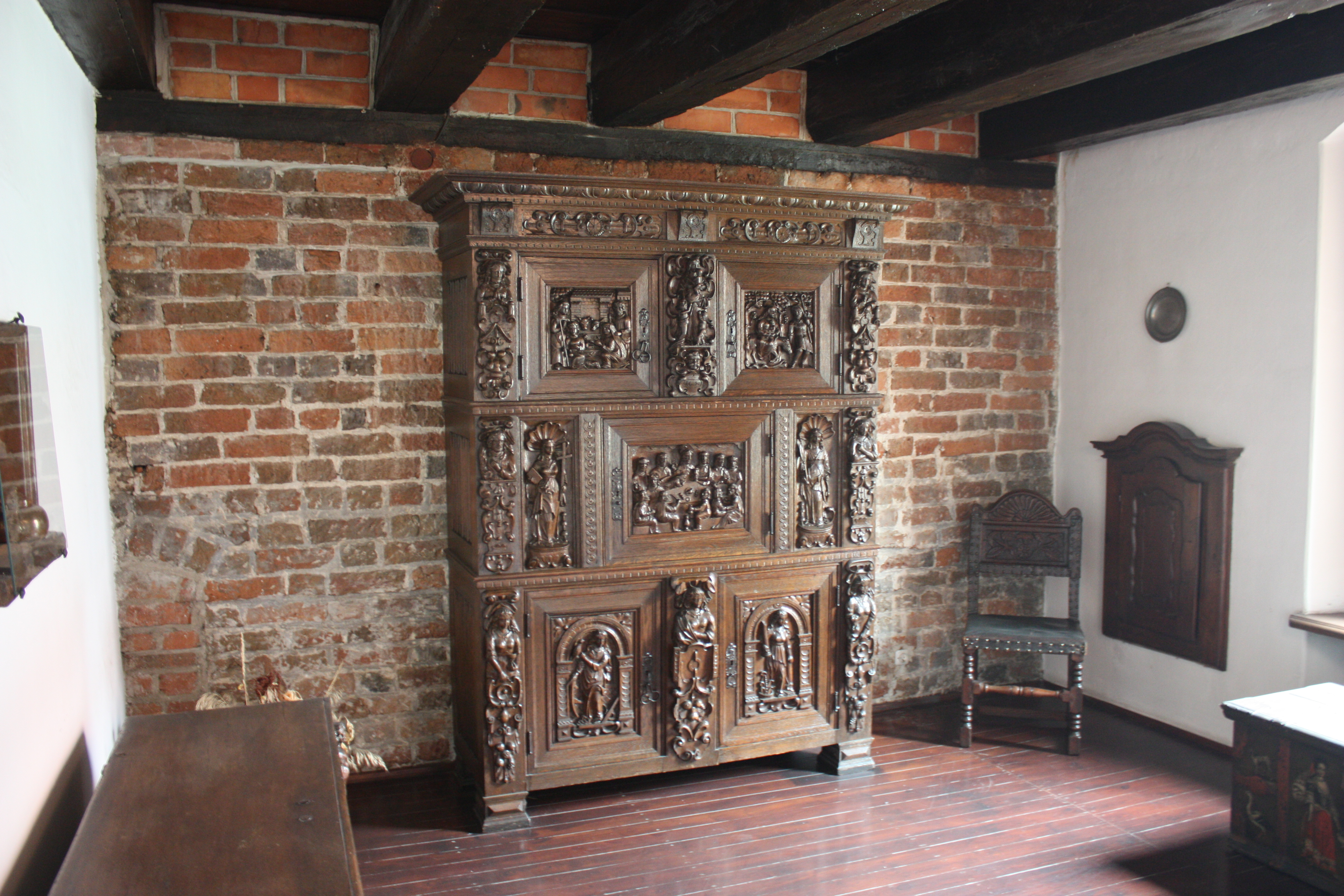

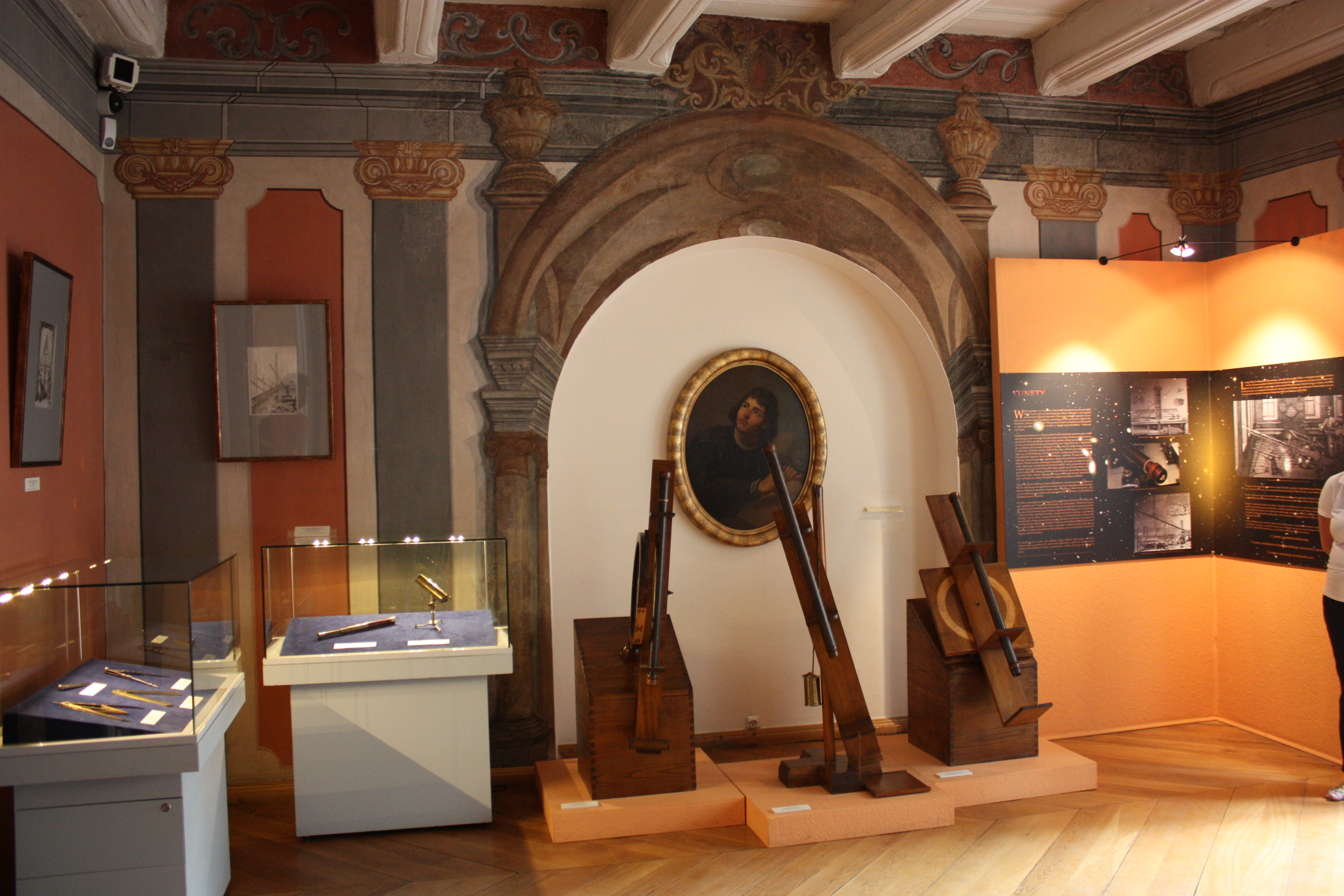
