= St. Michael Archangel's Church, Smolnik =

St. Michael Archangel's Church in Smolnik
- Cerkiew św. Michała Archanioła w Smolniku
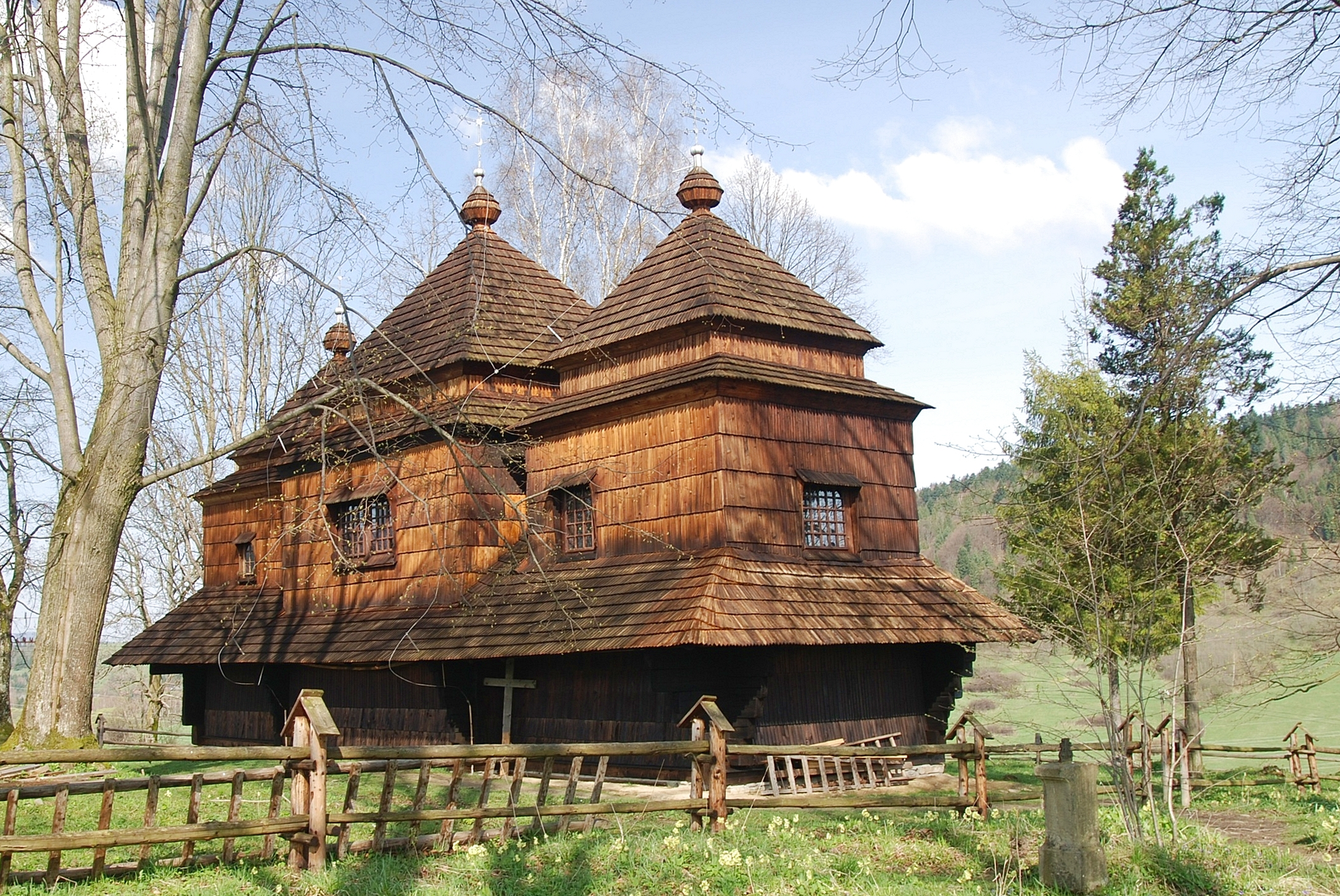
- St. Michael Archangel's Church in Smolnik
- Address: Smolnik, Bieszczady County
- Country: Poland
- Denomination: Roman Catholic Church

History
- Status: active church

Architecture
- Style: Gothic
- Completed: 1791

Administration
- Diocese: Roman Catholic Archdiocese of Przemyśl

UNESCO World Heritage Site
- Part of: Wooden Tserkvas of the Carpathian Region in Poland and Ukraine
- Criteria: Cultural: (iii), (iv)
- Reference: 1424-012
- Inscription: 2013 (37th Session)

St. Michael Archangel's Church in Smolnik - a Gothic, wooden church located in the village of Smolnik from the eighteenth-century, which together with different tserkvas is designated as part of the UNESCO Wooden tserkvas of the Carpathian region in Poland and Ukraine.

== History ==
The first reference to the existence of an Eastern Orthodox Church tserkva in Smolnik comes from a register in 1589 of the Sanok Land. It is presumed that the wooden tserkva was built at the start of the village, in 1530. The tserkva was most likely destroyed by fire or flooding. The second Eastern Orthodox Church tserkva in the village was raised in 1602, with the parish priest being Jan Hryniewiecki. The tserkva burnt down in October 1672, most likely due to Tatar invasions. After 1672, another tserkva was raised in a different location to increase its defence from invasions. Since 1697, the Uniate treaty was enforced into the Smolnik parish. The fourth tserkva to be built in the village was completed on August 1, 1791. The first major of the tserkva was carried out in 1921, largely financed by the parish. The roof wood shingle was replaced with tin and the iconostasis renovated. The tserkva's affiliation was to the Ukrainian Greek Catholic Church until 1951 (when as part of the 1951 Polish–Soviet territorial exchange, Smolnik was returned to Poland and the populace of the area moved to the Soviet Union. Parts of the tserkva's interior was moved to Łańcut. In 1974, the tserkva was transferred to the Roman Catholic parish. The tserkva had undergone a major renovation between 2004 and 2005.
