= Smolnik, Bieszczady County =

Smolnik
- Village
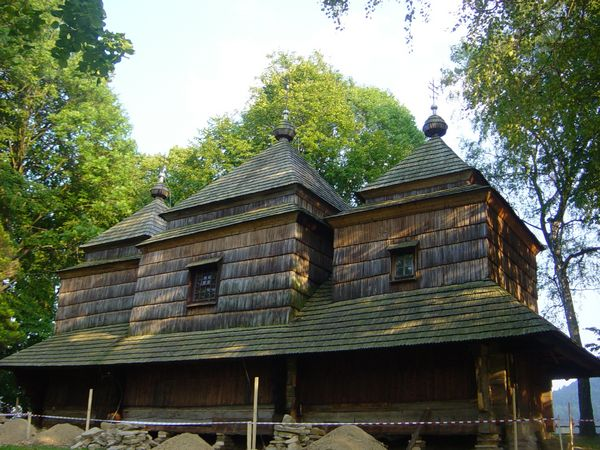
- Greek Catholic church of Saint Archangel Michael

- Location within Poland
- Coordinates: 49°13′42″N 22°41′53″E
- Country: Poland
- Voivodeship: Subcarpathian
- County: Bieszczady
- Gmina: Lutowiska
- Population: 182

Smolnik [ˈsmɔlɲik] is a village in the administrative district of Gmina Lutowiska, within Bieszczady County, Subcarpathian Voivodeship, in south-eastern Poland, close to the border with Ukraine.
