= Medieval Town of Toruń =

UNESCO World Heritage Site
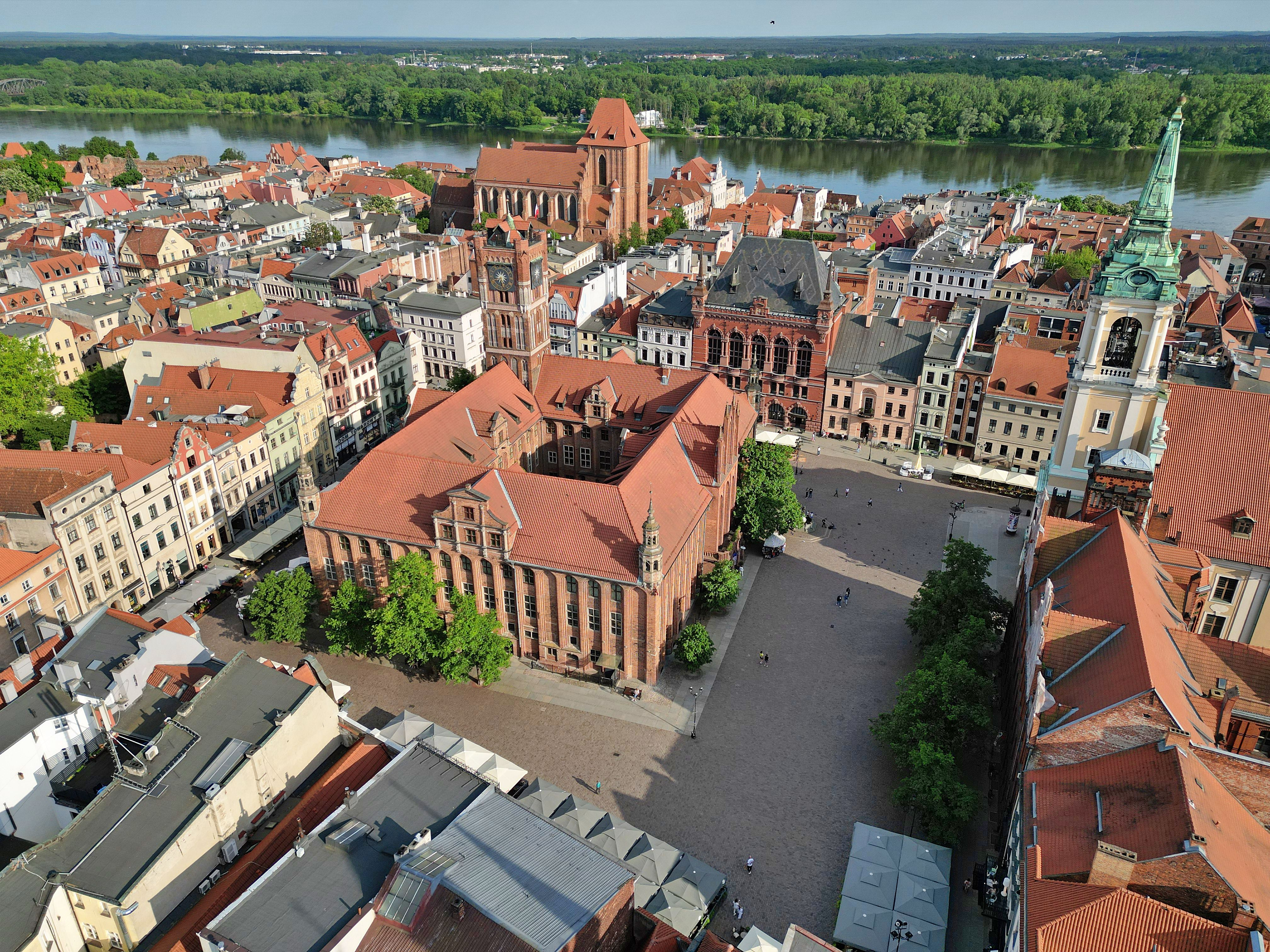
- Aerial view with the Market Square and Old Town Hall

- Location within Kuyavian-Pomeranian Voivodeship Location within Poland
- Location: Toruń, Kuyavian-Pomeranian Voivodeship, Poland
- Criteria: Cultural: (ii), (iv)
- Reference: 835
- Inscription: 1997 (21st Session)
- Area: 48 ha (120 acres)
- Buffer zone: 300 ha (740 acres)
- Coordinates: 53°0′36″N 18°37′10″E

Medieval Town of Toruń (Polish: zespół staromiejski Torunia) is the oldest historic district of the city of Toruń. It is one of Poland's World Heritage Sites (added in 1997) and Seven Wonders of Poland. According to UNESCO, its value lies in its being "a small historic trading city that preserves to a remarkable extent its original street pattern and outstanding early buildings, and which provides an exceptionally complete picture of the medieval way of life". The Medieval Town has an area of 60 ha and a buffer zone of 300 ha. It is composed of the Toruń Old Town, Toruń New Town, and the Toruń Castle.

== History ==
The Medieval Town was established on the site of a former Slavic trading town that had existed for around 500 years and dates to the 13th century, when the city of Toruń (Thorn) was granted a town charter by the Teutonic Knights Hermann von Salza and Hermann Balk in 1233. The town, initially composed primarily of the district now known as the Toruń Old Town and the Toruń Castle, developed as a major commercial center, and was one of the key members of the Hanseatic League. As the town quickly grew, the Toruń New Town developed from 1264 east of the Old Town and north of the castle.

The Medieval Town is one of Poland's official national Historic Monuments (Pomnik historii), as designated September 16, 1994. Its listing is maintained by the National Heritage Board of Poland.

== Geography and monuments ==
Plan of the Toruń historical town center. The Old Town is marked in yellow; New Town in blue; the Castle is between them to the south.

The Medieval Town of Toruń is composed of three parts: the Toruń Old Town in the west, Toruń New Town in the east, and the Toruń Castle in the south-east.

The Old Town is laid out around the Old Town Market Place. Major buildings and monuments there include the Old Town Hall, Cathedral Basilica of St. John the Baptist and St. John the Evangelist, Church of the Assumption of the Blessed Virgin Mary and the remains of the old town wall.

The New Town features Church of St James and Church of St Nicholas.

The Toruń Castle is located between the Old and New Towns at their southern boundary.

== UNESCO's World Heritage Site ==
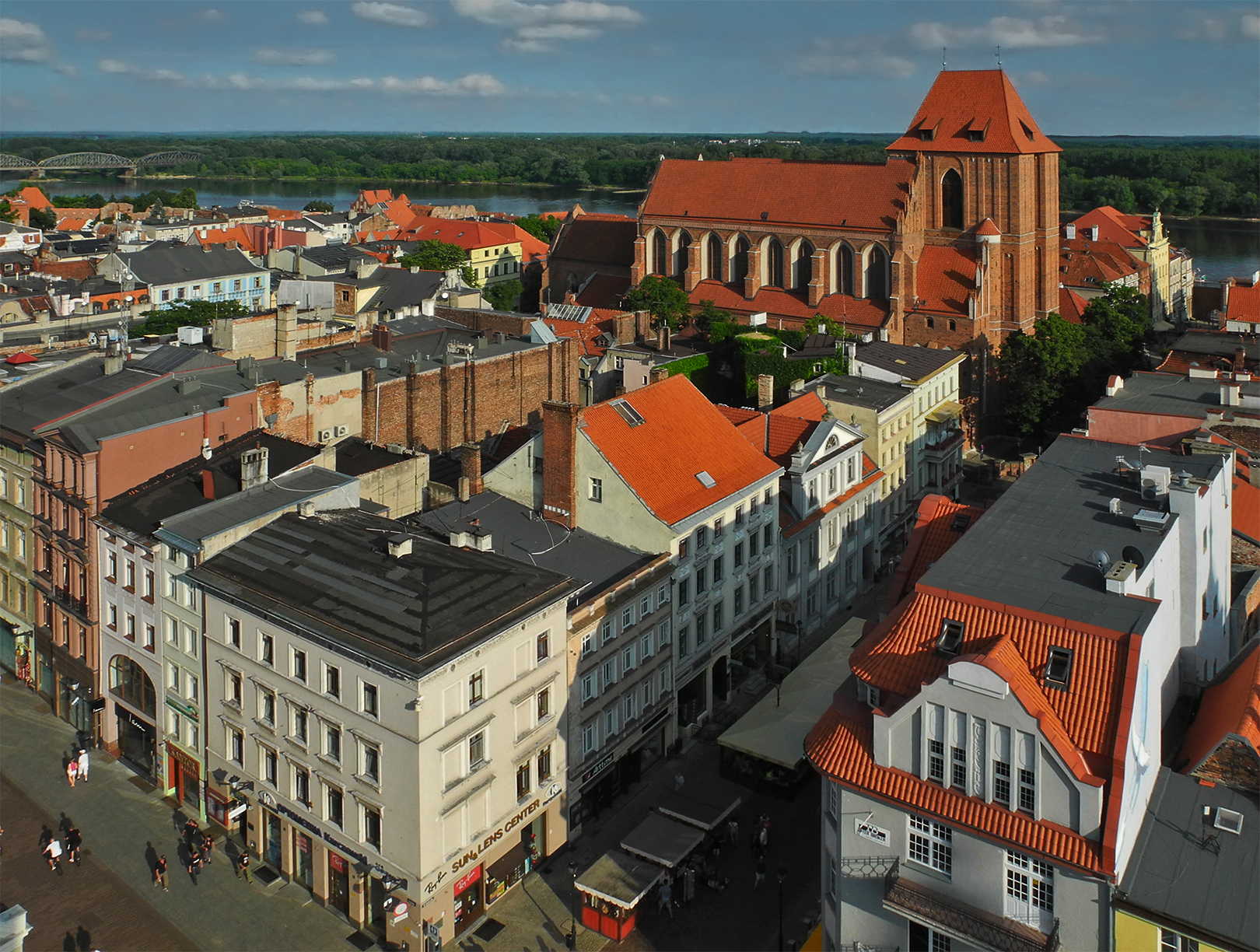
Medieval Town of Toruń, view from the Old Town City Hall

The World Heritage Committee passed it as a World Heritage Site on the basis of criteria (ii – "exhibits an important interchange of human values, over a span of time, or within a cultural area of the world, on developments in architecture or technology, monumental arts, town-planning, or landscape design") and (iv – "is an outstanding example of a type of building, Architectural, or Technological ensemble or landscape which illustrates a significant stage in human history"). It noted that Toruń represents a valuable example of "a small historic trading city that preserves to a remarkable extent its original street pattern and outstanding early buildings, and which provides an exceptionally complete picture of the medieval way of life". The spatial layout of Toruń has remained mostly unchanged since the Middle Ages and thus constitutes a valuable source for the urban history of medieval Europe.
