= Seven Wonders of Poland =

2007 Polish cultural list

The Seven Wonders of Poland (Polish: Siedem cudów Polski) is a short list of cultural wonders located in Poland. The creation of the list was initiated by the leading Polish newspaper Rzeczpospolita in a country-wide plebiscite held in September 2007. The results were published in the following month.

== History ==
Initially over 400 national monuments were selected as candidates by the magazine online-readers, however in the second round of selections a board of experts reduced the number to 27. The third and last round of public on-line voting started on 31 August 2007, to choose the top seven wonders. Results of the popular vote were announced on 21 September 2007.

Among the nominated buildings not included on the final list were Palace of Culture and Science and Palace on the Isle in Warsaw, St. Mary's Church, the Town Hall and the Artus Court in Gdańsk, Wrocław Town Hall, the Romanesque Gniezno Doors and the Gniezno Cathedral, and the Kalwaria Zebrzydowska Monastery.

== The list ==
#	Name	Location	Image
1	Wieliczka Salt Mine; Kopalnia soli Wieliczka; UNESCO World Heritage Site	Wieliczka, Lesser Poland	
2	Toruń Old Town; UNESCO World Heritage Site	Toruń, Kuyavian-Pomeranian Voivodeship	
3	Malbork Castle; Zamek w Malborku; UNESCO World Heritage Site	Malbork, Pomerania	
4	Wawel Castle and Cathedral; Zamek Królewski na Wawelu	Kraków, Lesser Poland	
5	Elbląg Canal; Kanał Elbląski	Warmian-Masurian Voivodeship	
6	Zamość Old Town; UNESCO World Heritage Site	Zamość, Lublin Voivodeship	
7	Kraków Market Square and Old Town; UNESCO World Heritage Site	Kraków, Lesser Poland	

== See also ==
- List of Historic Monuments (Poland)
- Wonders of the World (disambiguation)
- Wonders of the World
