= Lopushnia =

Rural locality in Ivano-Frankivsk Oblast, Ukraine

Coordinates: 49°22′50″N 24°46′22″E

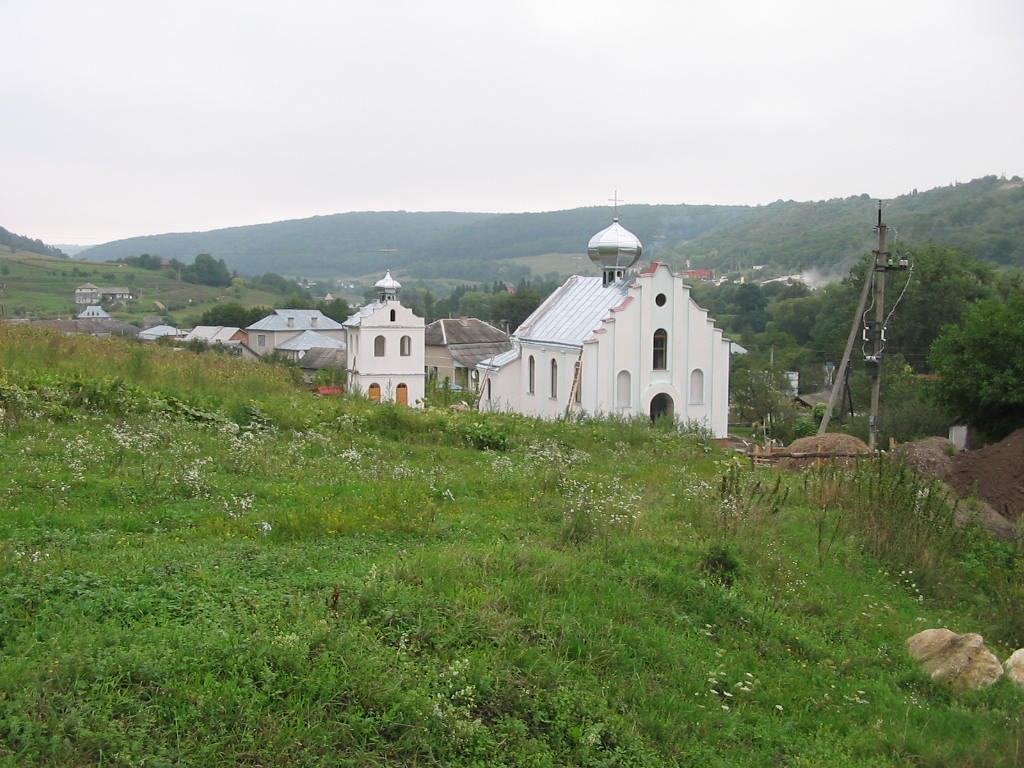
Newly built Ukrainian Orthodox Church (of Kyiv Patriarchate) in Lopushnia

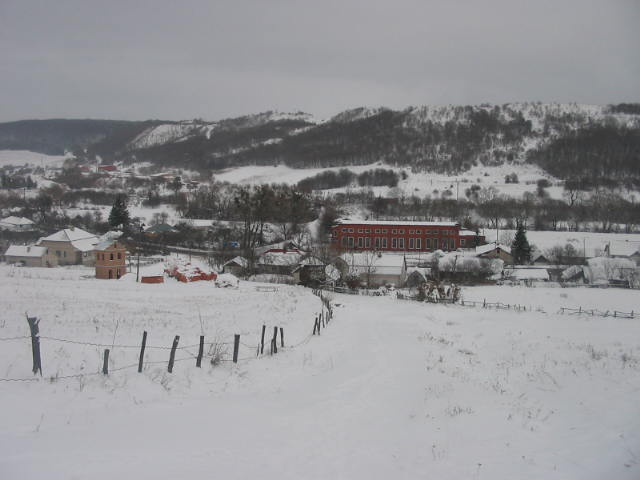
View over Lopushnia at winter time

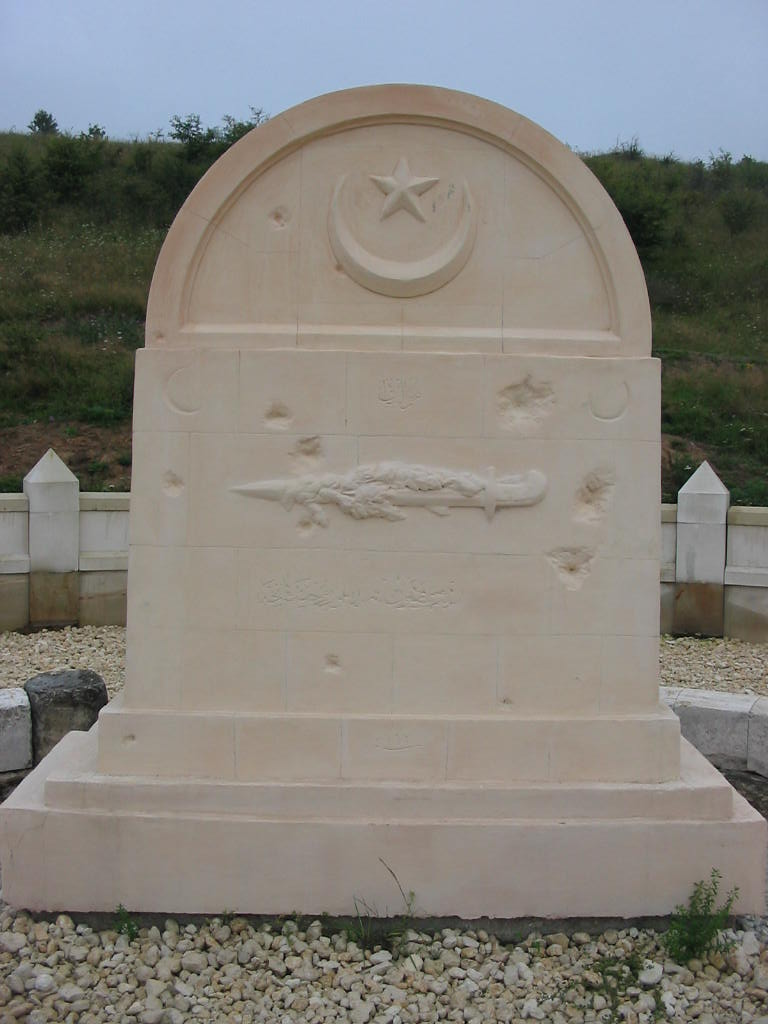
Memorial at the Turkish Military Cemetery (from First World War) in Lopushnia

Lopushnia, Lopushnya, sometimes Lopushna (Ukrainian: Лопушня, Polish: Lopuszna, Lopusznia) is a village of 282 people in Ivano-Frankivsk Raion of Ivano-Frankivsk Oblast in the western part of Ukraine. It is the first village on the highway when entering Ivano-Frankivsk Oblast from the side of Berezhany and Ternopil Oblast. Lopushnia belongs to Rohatyn urban hromada, one of the hromadas of Ukraine. The river Narayivka flows through Lopushnia.

In terms of administration the village is subordinated to the village council in Verkhnia Lypytsia, a much larger neighbouring village 2 km away.

There are daily bus connections between Lopushnia and Rohatyn, and between Lopushnia and Berezhany. The village is easily accessible by road and public transport.

There are vast deposits of limestone in the hills. Limestone is being mined and slaked here.

The closest railway station is in Pidvysoke, less than 1 km away.

== History ==
An idol of ancient Slavic deity of Swietowit was found at Lopushnia.

In 1772–1918, Lopushnia was part of the Austrian empire. In 1918–1919, of West Ukrainian People's Republic, and from 1920 to 1939, of Poland.

During the First World War, there was a front line in Lopushnia and the surrounding areas. As a result, there are numerous trenches and bomb holes in the local forests. There is also a First World War Turkish Military Cemetery and Memorial to the fallen Turkish soldiers here. There is also Austrian Military Cemetery, in desolate condition.

There is a significant community of deported Ukrainians from south-east Poland (Lemkovyna and Nadsannia / Upper San valley) residing in Lopushnia. They have been forcefully resettled here during "Action Vistula" in the late-1940s. A monument commemorating this event (with the names of deportees and their original villages) has been erected next to the new church in Lopushnia.

Until 18 July 2020, Lopushnia belonged to Rohatyn Raion. The raion was abolished in July 2020 as part of the administrative reform of Ukraine, which reduced the number of raions of Ivano-Frankivsk Oblast to six. The area of Rohatyn Raion was merged into Ivano-Frankivsk Raion.

== Village data ==
- Population 282
- Size 2,239 km^{2}
- Population density 125,95 persons/km^{2}
- Postal code is 77044
- Telephone code is +380 03435

== Neighbouring localities ==
- Pidvysoke
- Verkhnia Lypytsia
- Nyzhnia Lypytsia
- Kuriany
- Rohatyn
- Chesnyky
- Berezhany
- Pukiv
- Honorativka
- Korchunok
- Stratyn

== Gallery ==
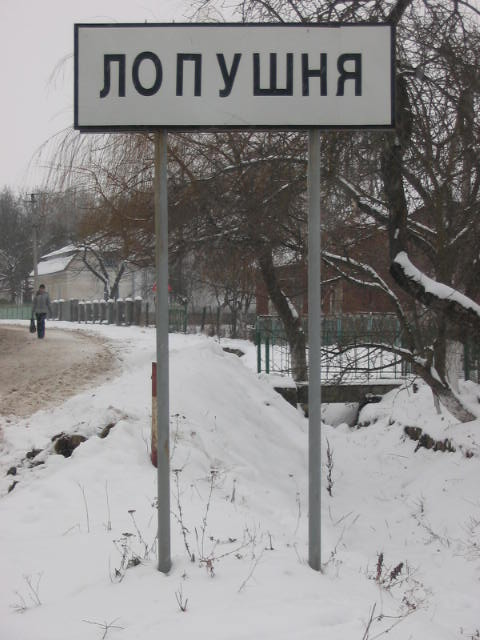

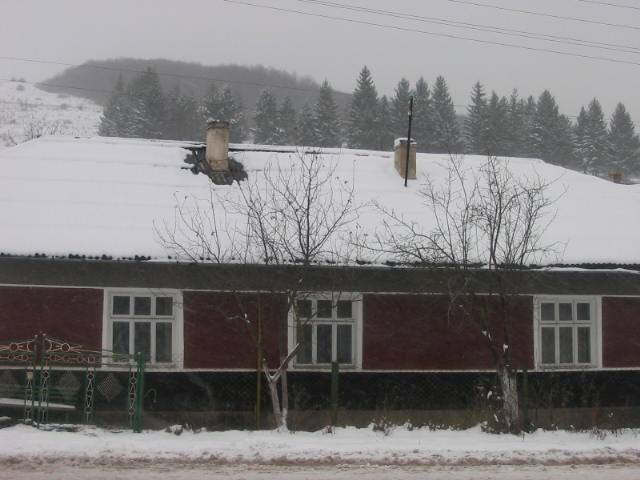

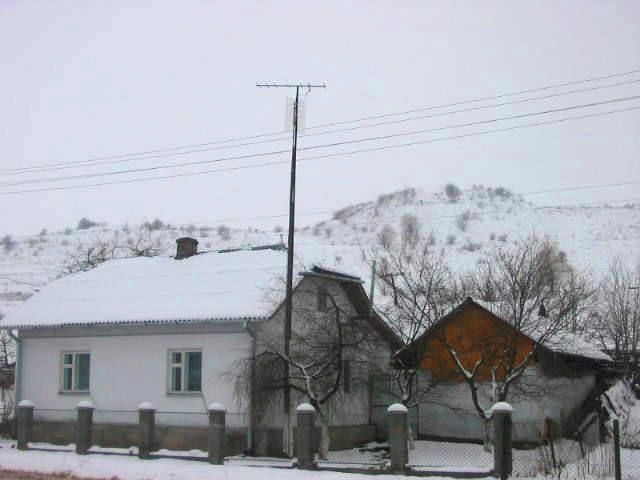

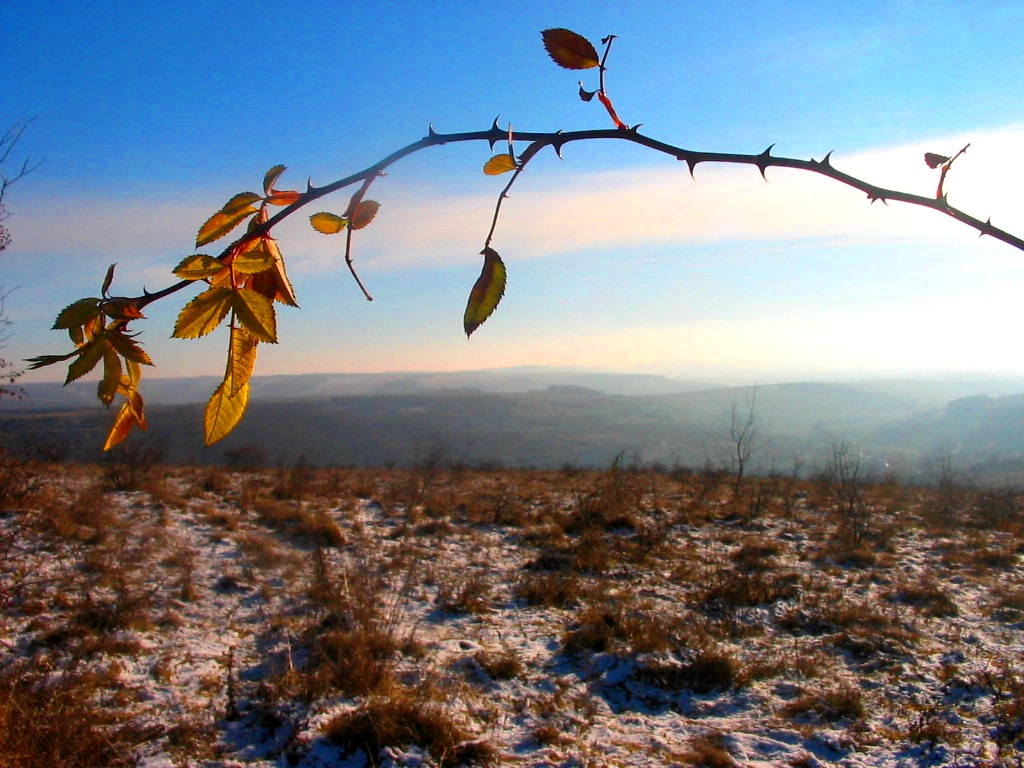

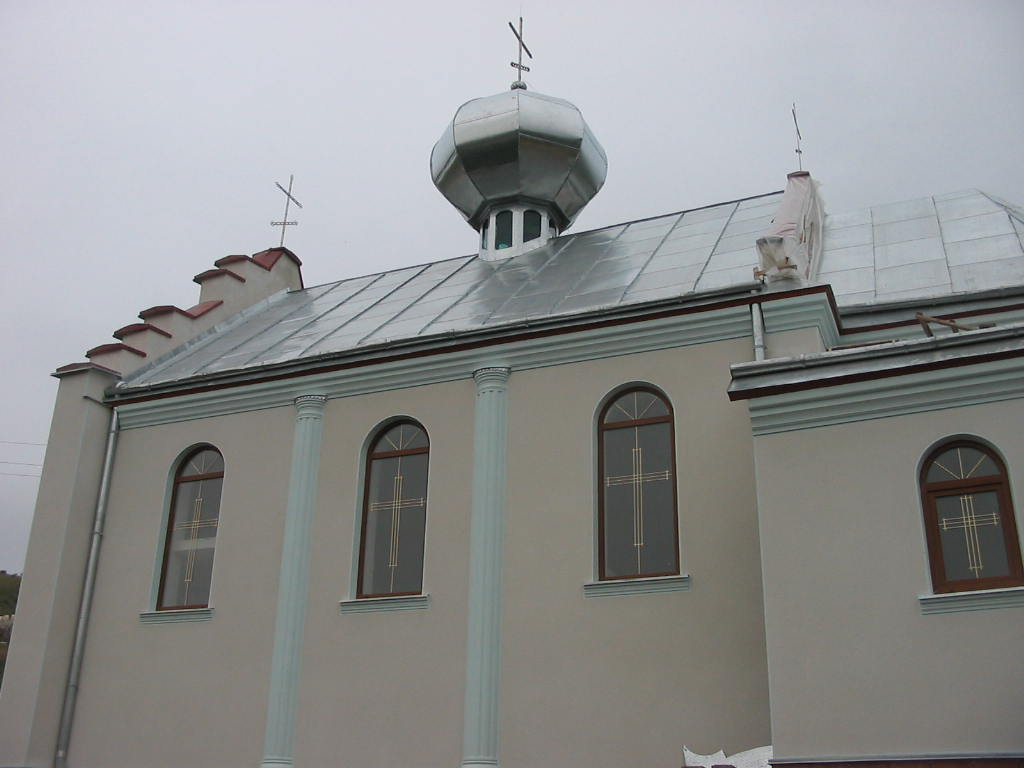

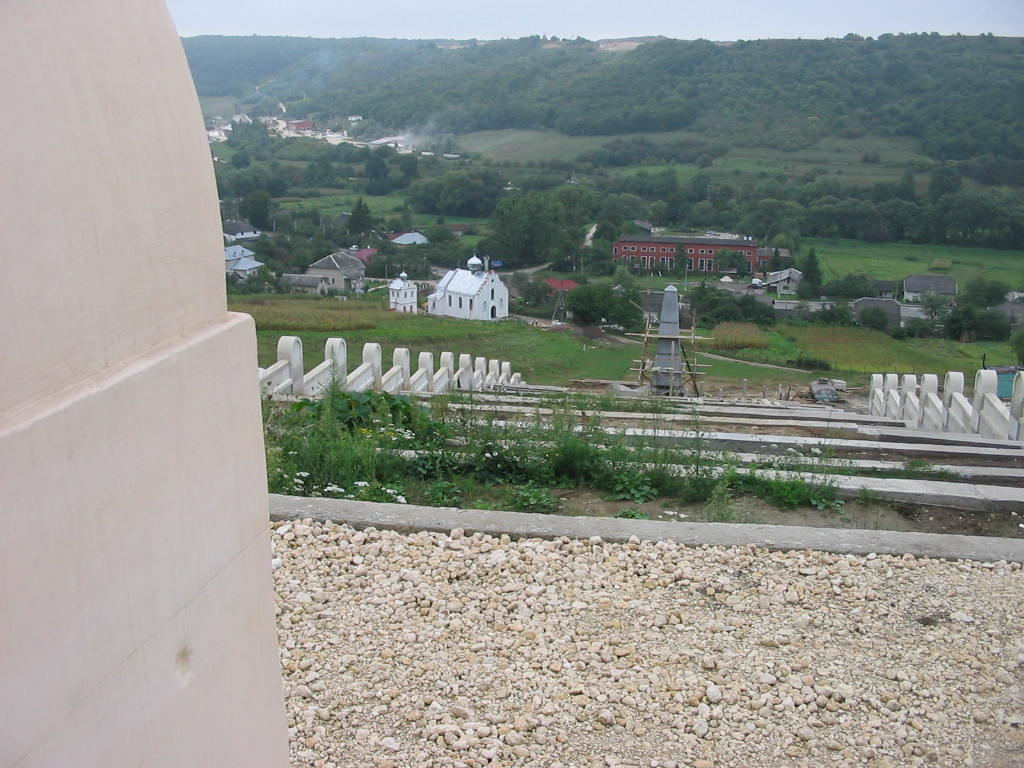

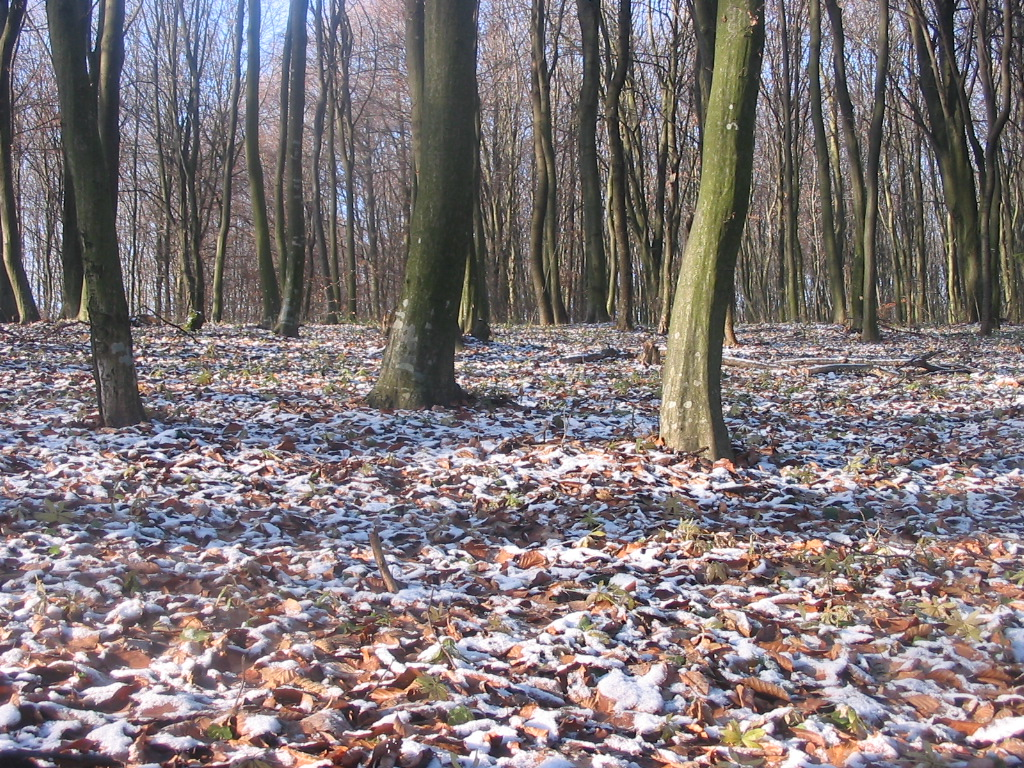

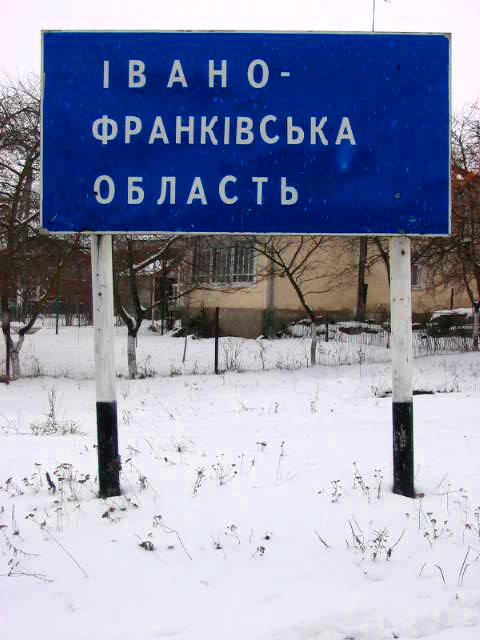

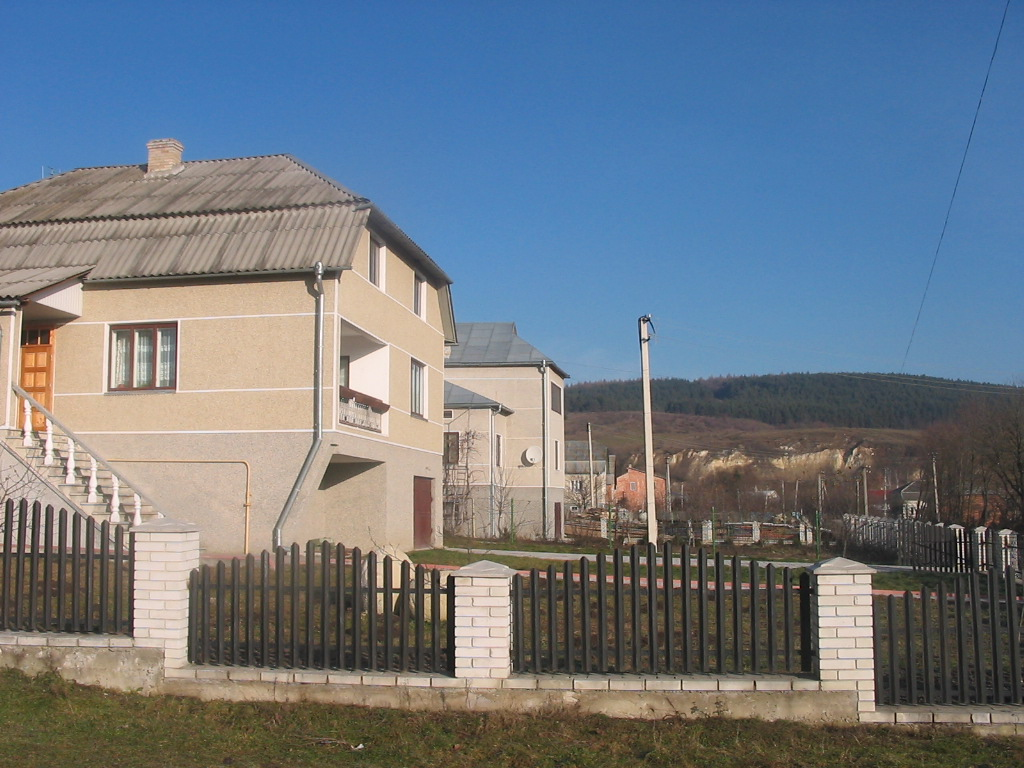

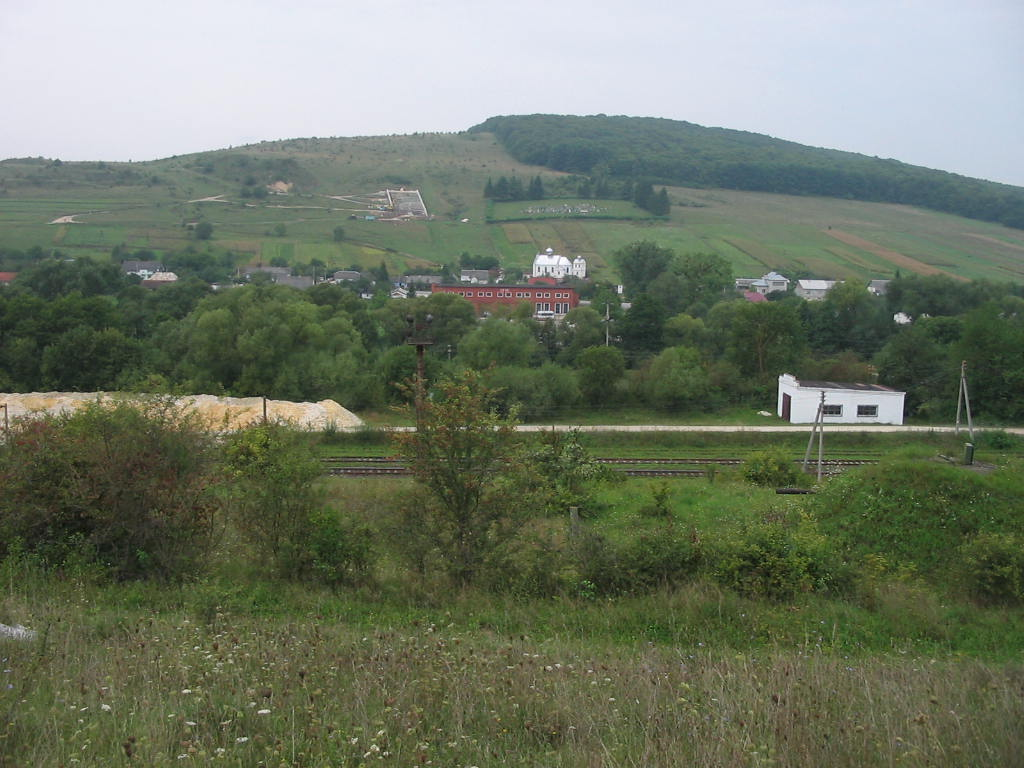

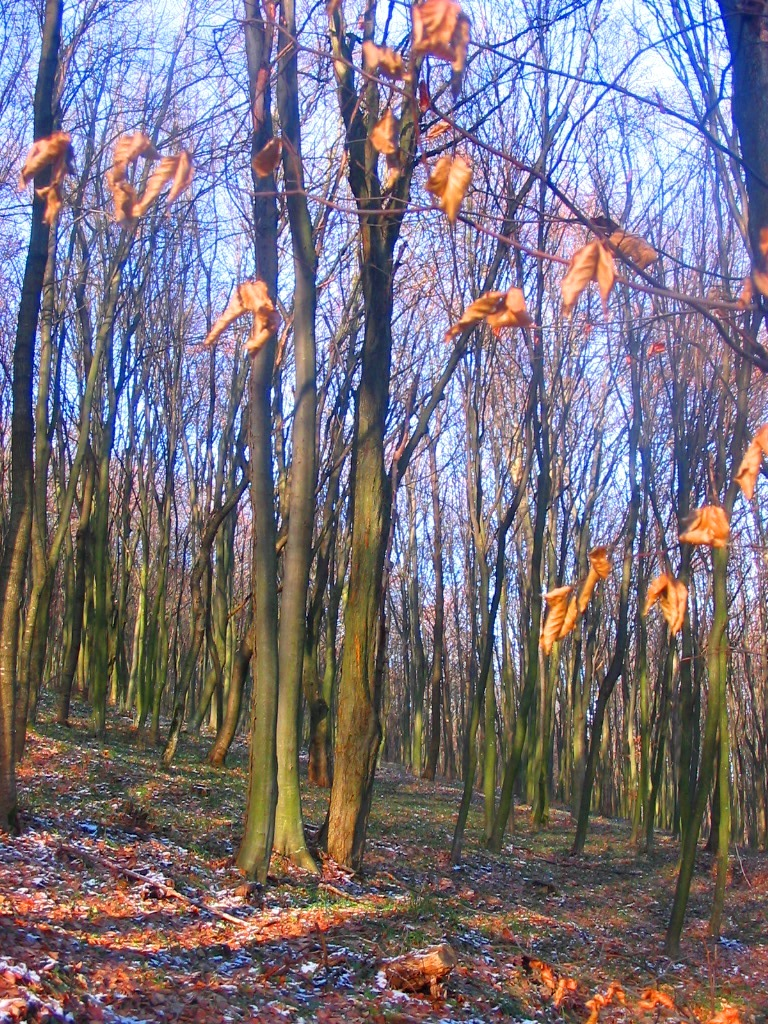

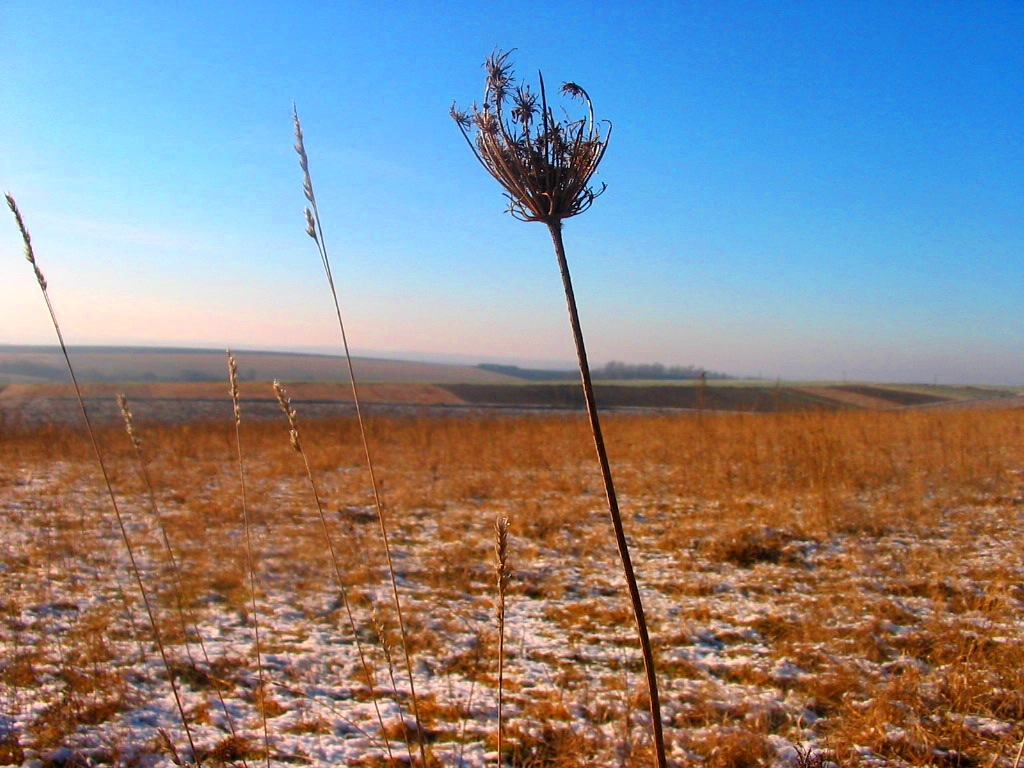
