= Stratyn =

Rural locality in Ivano-Frankivsk Oblast, Ukraine

Coordinates: 49°28′N 24°42′E

Old coat of arms of Stratyn, during prewar period.

Stratyn (Ukrainian: Стратин, Yiddish: סטרעטין Stretin) is a village and rural municipality in western Ukraine. It lies in Ivano-Frankivsk Raion of Ivano-Frankivsk Oblast of Ukraine, in the centre of the historic area of Halychyna (Galicia / Galizien / Galicja / Galizia), formerly in Austrian empire (1772–1918), Poland (1365–1772, 1918–1939) and USSR (1939–1941, 1944–1991). The current population is 561 inhabitants. The old name of the village was Striatyn. Stratyn belongs to Rohatyn urban hromada, one of the hromadas of Ukraine.

== Geography ==
Stratyn used to be a town, and it had two parts which were usually referred as Startyn selo / Stratyn the village (Stratyn-wies in Polish) and Stratyn misto / Stratyn the city (Stratyn-miasto). There was a rathaus (city council) in Stratyn during Austrian times. Stratin is Russian name of the village, which is found on some maps from the Soviet period (1939–1941, 1944–1991), while Stratyn is the Ukrainian and Polish name of this village. In Yiddish its name was Strettin / Staretin (hence the Yiddish adjective forms Strettiner, Stretiner, Stratiner, Stratyner). The village is situated in the valley of a small river or brook, surrounded by forests and fields. In 1932, when Stratyn was part of Poland (during 1918–1932), the town status of Stratyn was canceled by the order of the Minister of Internal Affairs of Poland (September 9, 1932). Prior to this order, Stratyn had just 373 inhabitants (1921) and at the time was the smallest town in the entire Ivano-Frankivsk (Stanislawow) province.

Nowadays, Stratyn is a large village, about 12 km from the district center of Rohatyn.

== Nearby locations ==
- Rohatyn, district center
- Berezhany, city
- Pukiv, village
- Lopushnia, village
- Pidvysoke, village
- Cherche, village and spa resort
- Lviv, the largest city in western Ukraine

== History ==
In this village, around 1600, there was opened one of the first printing houses in Ukraine. The printers who used to work here included Hedeon Balaban and Pamvo Berynda (one of the first printers on Ukrainian lands). It was namely in 1599 that the third printshop in Ukraine was founded in the village of Stratyn, and another was established in the village of Krylos, near Halych. There is monument to the Ukrainian writer Taras Shevchenko in Startyn. The last was erected quite recently, after the collapse of Soviet system.

Until 18 July 2020, Stratyn belonged to Rohatyn Raion. The raion was abolished in July 2020 as part of the administrative reform of Ukraine, which reduced the number of raions of Ivano-Frankivsk Oblast to six. The area of Rohatyn Raion was merged into Ivano-Frankivsk Raion.

== Jewish community ==
Stratyn had a Jewish community that gave name to the local Stretiner Hasidic dynasty. The Jewish cemetery of Stratyn contains graves of various Stretiner Hasidim and tzadikim. A chapel was erected there quite recently, with efforts being led by Rabbi Aharon Yaakov Brandwein, the previous Stretiner Rebbe of Boro Park, with much help from the Lviv Jewish Community. Prayer books in Hebrew (printed in Israel) are available in the chapel.

Well-known Stretin Hasidic rabbis were Avraham Brandwein (the previous Admor of the dynasty), his father Yehudah Tzvi Brandwein, and Moshe of Stretin.
