= Voskresyntsi =

Rural locality in Ivano-Frankivsk Oblast, Ukraine

Voskresyntsi Воскресинці
- Location in Ivano-Frankivsk Oblast Voskresyntsi (Ukraine)
- Coordinates: 49°21′35″N 24°25′32″E
- Country: Ukraine
- Oblast: Ivano-Frankivsk Oblast
- Raion: Ivano-Frankivsk Raion
- Hromada: Rohatyn urban hromada

Population
  - Total: 698
- Time zone: UTC+2 (EET)
  - Summer (DST): UTC+3 (EEST)
- Postal code: 77034

Voskresyntsi (Ukrainian: Воскресинці) is a village in the Rohatyn urban hromada of the Ivano-Frankivsk Raion of Ivano-Frankivsk Oblast in Ukraine.

== History ==
Gradually, the small hamlet grew into a village, which in ancient times was called Bilyi Kamin. Voskresyntsi is mentioned on 22 June 1439, in the records of the Galician court.

On 19 July 2020, as a result of the administrative-territorial reform and liquidation of the Rohatyn Raion, the village became part of the Ivano-Frankivsk Raion.

== Notable residents ==
- Artur Dron (born 2000), Ukrainian writer, poet, soldier

== Bibliography ==
- "Oskrzesińce (1)". Geographical Dictionary of the Kingdom of Poland (in Polish). 7. Warszawa: Kasa im. Józefa Mianowskiego. 1886. p. 641.
