= Pacification of Ukrainians in Eastern Galicia =

Police action in interwar Poland

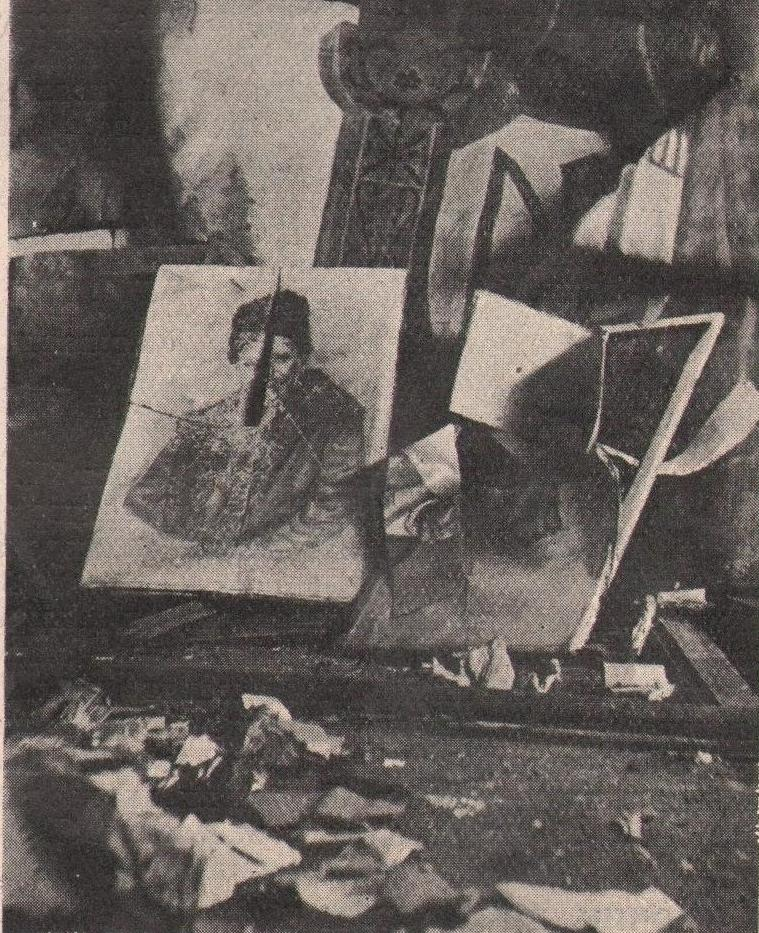
- Prosvita society reading room demolished during Pacification in September–October of 1930. Knyahynychi, today Rohatyn Raion
- Location: Eastern Galicia
- Date: 16 September − 30 November 1930
- Attack type: Mass searches, arrests, destruction of property, food
- Perpetrator: Polish Sanation regime
- Motive: Crackdown on Ukrainian nationalists

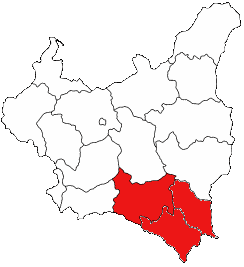
Eastern Lesser Poland / Eastern Galicia: Lwów (Lviv), Tarnopol (Ternopil) and Stanisławów (Stanyslaviv, now Ivano-Frankivsk) Voivodeships - territories inhabited by the Ukrainian minority in the Second Polish Republic and affected by the pacification in 1930

The Pacification of Ukrainians in Eastern Galicia was a punitive action against Ukrainians in Galicia, carried out by police and military of the Second Polish Republic from September until November 1930 in reaction to a wave of sabotage and acts of terror perpetrated by Ukrainian nationalists. (Note: Snyder writes: "In July 1930, Ukrainian nationalists began sabotage actions in Galicia, destroying Polish properties and homes throughout the region in hundreds of terrorist actions. In September, Piłsudski ordered the pacification of Galicia, sending a thousand policemen to search 450 villages for nationalist agitators... "In 1930, as the OUN terrorized the Galician countryside...Volhynia remained comparatively peaceful...")

It took place in 16 Polish counties of three southeastern voivodeships. During the Interbellum this area was part of the so-called Eastern Lesser Poland province. Therefore, in Ukrainian and Polish literature this event is called "Pacification of/in Eastern Galicia" (Ukrainian: Пацифікація у Східній Галичині) (Polish: Pacyfikacja Galicji Wschodniej) and "Pacification of Eastern Lesser Poland" (Polish: Pacyfikacja Małopolski Wschodniej).

== Background ==
=== Annexation of Galicia by Poland ===
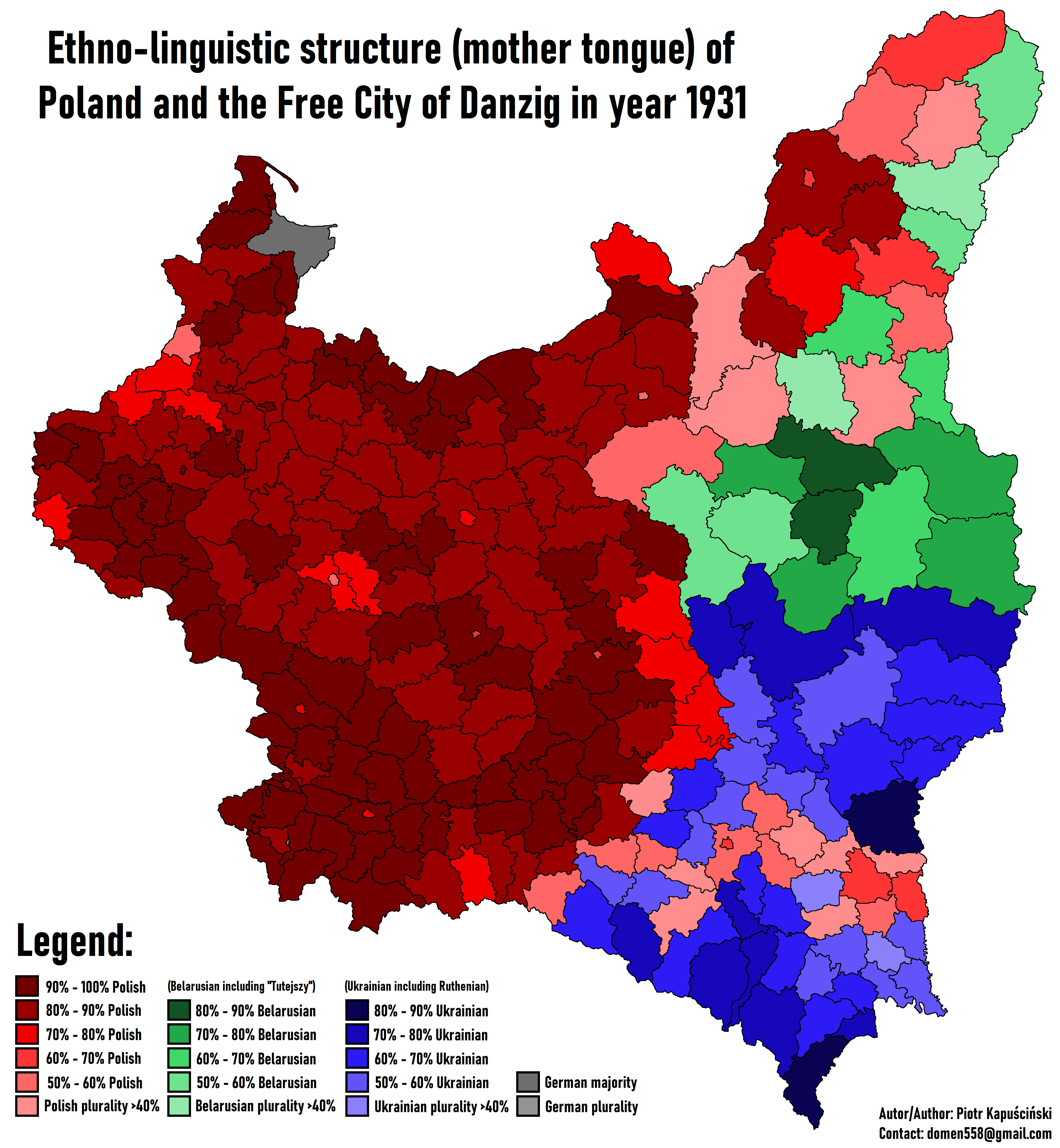
Linguistic map of Poland according to the 1931 Polish census.

The ethnic composition of Eastern Galicia in 1931: in Lwów Voivodeship Poles made up 57,7% of population, Ukrainians and Ruthenians 34,1%, and 7,5% of inhabitants were Jews, who identified mostly as Polish Jews or just Jewish; in Tarnopol Voivodeship 49,3% was Polish, 45,5% Ukrainian and Ruthenian, 4,9% Jewish; Stanisławów Voivodeship was 68,8% Ukrainian and Ruthenian, 22,4% Polish and 7,4% Jewish. Territories east of the Curzon line were incorporated into the Second Polish Republic after Austria-Hungary's collapse and the defeat of the short-lived West Ukrainian People's Republic (ZUNR).

During the Polish-Ukrainian war of 1918–1919 up to 30–35 thousand of Ukrainians, including prisoners of war and hostages, were held in Polish POW and internment camps, collection stations and prisons. Of this number, about 1.5–2 thousand people successfully escaped, and a further 1.5 thousand prisoners, internees, and hostages died due to epidemic diseases, starvation, or natural causes. After the war, in 1920–1921, approximately 100,000 Ukrainians, most of them from UNR, but also some from ZUNR were held in internment camps by the Polish government, where they were often denied food and medicine; some of them died from starvation, disease or suicide. The victims included not only soldiers and officers but also priests, lawyers and doctors who had supported the Ukrainian cause. The death toll from diseased at these camps was estimated at 20,000 people. During the war the West Ukrainian government had also interned Poles in camps which contributed to ethnic tensions in the interwar period. (Note: The interment was described by Jan Zamorski in his Sejm Speech as such: "Seeing conspiracies everywhere, Poles were immediately deported. The main internment camps we have so far visited were in Żółkiew, Lwów, Złoczów, Tarnopol, Mikulińce, Strusów, Jazłowiec, Kołomyja at Kosacz, and others. The internees were driven in winter into unheated barracks. At first they were given nothing to eat for several days, and afterwards in the morning some kind of coffee; sometimes once a week or once every two weeks a piece of black bread; sometimes a piece of horsemeat; sometimes instead of dinner, boiled pumpkins. I have here a photograph of internees who suffered severe frostbite to their legs in the camps after which their legs were amputated. They froze, and then they fell ill. The main disease that spread there was typhus. In Mikulińce alone, more than 600 deaths from typhus were recorded. Similar deaths occurred likewise in Jazłowiec, Strusów, Kołomyja, Tarnopol. The sick were always housed together with the healthy. For example, in Mikulińce, Dr. Shpor would come, declare from a distance that everything was in order, even though he was told that there was typhus present, even though the Polish nurses, that is, the ladies from the committee, said that it was typhus, he insisted it was only influenza. And under such conditions, thousands of people perished. The arrangement of these internment camps was of such a kind that one must conclude that there was deliberate intent to exterminate as many Poles as possible. The sick were always kept together with the healthy, so that disease spread artificially. Such cases are recorded in Tarnopol in two prisons, in Półkowińkówka, in three schools, in the prison in Strusów, Mikulińce, Kołomyja and so on. Interment was carried out in such a way that people were usually seized at night, not allowed to take anything with them, and naturally looting began. In this way the internees sat either naked, often in rags, half-military clothing, in filth and hunger. In Tarnopol, a committee of Polish ladies was formed, made up of several dozen women. They divided themselves into groups of fifteen. The first fifteen went to care for the sick and brought them food begged from the villages, which Polish peasants carried in, until one by one all the women themselves succumbed to typhus. Then the second fifteen went, then the third. Many of those people died. A priest also died; all the other priests went about giving the sacraments to the sick and the dying, despite suffering from typhus two or three times. Internees were driven to forced labor. For example, in Tarnopol, more than 200 people were driven out, either barefoot or with feet wrapped in straw, in the frost to work supposedly on the railway, and every day several died from the cold while others fell ill.")

After the establishment of Polish rule, the name of Ukrainians in official documents was replaced with the historic term "Ruthenians", Galicia's autonomy was abolished and its territory was divided into three voivodeships, known collectively as "East Lesser Poland". In order to prevent the consolidation of ethnic minorities, the Polish government manipulated census data, as a result of which the number of people identifying themselves as tutejszy ("locals") grew from 38,000 in 1921 to 707,000 ten years later, the vast majority of the "Tutejszy" people were located in Polesia, a part of the region that is now in modern-day Belarus and was not part of Eastern Galicia. The Ukrainian language was banned in government agencies in 1924 and support was steadily withdrawn from Ukrainian schools.

At the same time, government attitudes in respect to Ukrainians differed between Galicia and Volhynia: in the former, Lwów University professor Stanisław Grabski promoted total assimilation of Ukrainian ethnicity, meanwhile Volhynian governor Henryk Józewski supported recognition of local Ukrainians as fellow Polish citizens. Józewski fostered Ukrainian and Polish-Ukrainian organizations. In education, he supported the teaching of the Ukrainian language and argued for the introduction of Ukrainian as the local official language, as Piłsudski, Józewski espoused a multicultural and multinational view, he opposed Soviet influences over Poland's Ukrainians and criticized certain Ukrainian organizations that he viewed as too Soviet-dependent or too extremist (e.g. Prosvita).

However, due to the economic state of Poland during the Great Depression, local leaders were not replaced, so Ukrainian organizations were taken over by the state, but mostly run at a local level by the same people. During the 1920s, the so-called "Sokal border" was established by Polish authorities between the two regions in order to stop the spread of Ukrainian press and prevent the establishment of Ukrainian cooperatives and Prosvita societies in Volhynia. Józewski's efforts were greatly feared by Stalin, who was fearful that Wołyń would end up as a Piedmont to Ukrainian nationalism and engulf Soviet Ukraine.

=== Formation of Ukrainian resistance ===
The transfer of Galicia under Polish control by the Entente in 1919 was officially justified by the need to defend the area from Bolshevik troops, who during that time had reached the Zbruch river on its eastern borders. Nevertheless, the local Ukrainian population tended to recognize the government of West Ukrainian People's Republic headed by Yevhen Petrushevych as their legitimate authority. Despite this, in 1923 Entente countries formally recognized Galicia as part of Poland in exchange for Polish promises to grant the region local autonomy and establish a Ukrainian university. None of the latter measures were implemented by Warsaw.

The policies of the interwar Polish government led to a radicalization of Ukrainian society in Galicia. In order to oppose Polish control over their land, in 1920 Ukrainian veterans of World War I and following conflicts established the Ukrainian Military Organization (UVO), which engaged in underground activities against the government and organized political murders of Ukrainians viewed as Polish collaborationists, for example Sydir Tverdokhlib. In 1921 Ukrainian Stepan Fedak attempted to assassinate Polish leader Józef Piłsudski during the latter's visit to Lviv. As part of their activities, Ukrainians in Galicia organized a boycott of the 1922 Polish parliamentary election and established a Secret Ukrainian University, which provided education to over 1200 students. In 1924 another assassination attempt was organized against Polish president Stanisław Wojciechowski.

Ukrainian resistance organizations established close contacts with the Weimar Republic and, later, Nazi Germany, while others kept in contact with the new Soviet government to the east. Polish-Ukrainian relations further deteriorated during the Great Depression, leading to much economic disruption, with the rural areas being hit particularly hard. In this atmosphere, radical Ukrainian nationalists propagating active resistance to Polish domination found a ready response from Ukrainian youth. In 1929 a congress of Ukrainian activists in Vienna established the Organization of Ukrainian Nationalists (OUN). In its activities, the organization employed methods of anti-government terror and "expropriations", similar to those once employed by Piłsudski's Polish Socialist Party. (Note: The Polish left-wing independence movement operating against the Russian Empire primarily targeted governmental structures, like seizing Polish tax revenues and government funds being transported by train from Warsaw to Russia, the targeting of civilians was rare and, when it occurred, was most often an unintended consequence of operations directed against the government. In contrast, the OUN's actions primarily affected Polish and Jewish civilians, as well as Ukrainian moderates and liberals who opposed the actions and the ideology of Ukrainian nationalists.)

=== OUN sabotage campaign ===
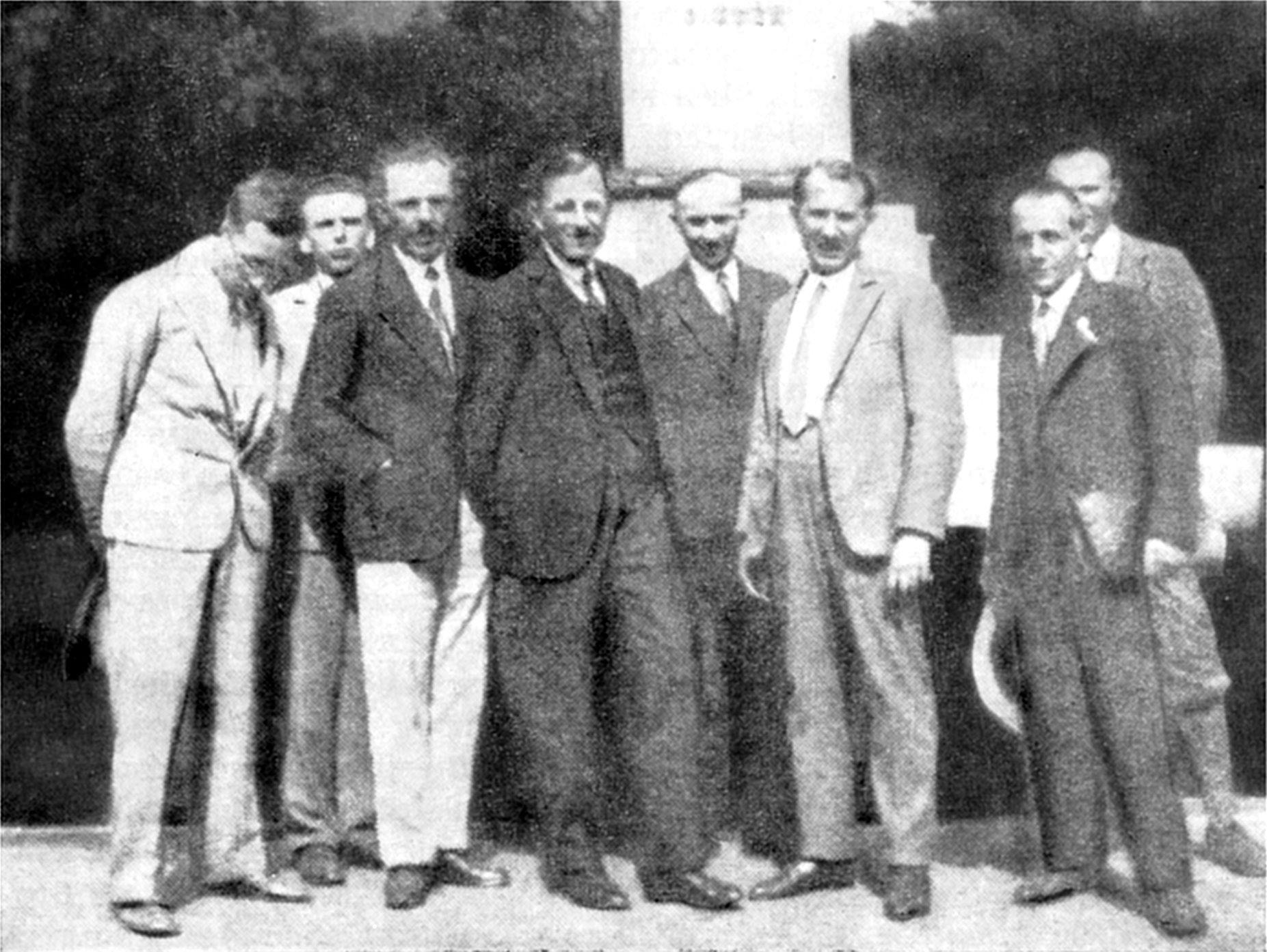
Konovalets with fellow OUN members in Prague, June 1930

In July 1930, activists of the extremist OUN began sabotage actions, during which warehouses and cereal fields owned by Poles were burned, Polish and Jewish homes were destroyed, bridges were blown up, state institutions, rail lines and telephone connections were damaged. The organizer of the action was Yevhen Konovalets. In the 1930s OUN received funds from Lithuania, Italy, Japan and the Ukrainian diaspora in the US.

The main reason behind the sabotage campaign was the mainstream Ukrainian parties' decision to participate in the Polish elections, coupled with Józef Piłsudski's policy of tolerance, which threatened the OUN's position in Ukrainian society. The organization reacted by adopting a tactic designed to radicalize Ukrainian public opinion and block any form of compromise with Polish authorities. The OUN used terrorism and sabotage in order to force the Polish government into reprisals so fierce that they would cause the more moderate Ukrainian groups ready to negotiate with the Polish state to lose support. OUN directed its violence not only against the Poles but also against all Ukrainians wishing for a peaceful settlement of the Polish-Ukrainian conflict.

Over time, local Ukrainians, many of whom saw the Poles as occupiers of their land, joined the action. Offices of the Polish paramilitary Riflemen's Association were burned, as were the stands of the popular trade fairs in Lwów (Lviv). Government offices and mail trucks were attacked. This situation lasted until September, with some sporadic incidents happening as late as November. Between July and November 1930, there were 197 cases of terrorist and sabotage activities. The vast majority, 172 incidents, were directed against private civilian property, mostly belonging to Polish and Jewish civilians, only 25 cases involved state-owned property, this shows that the violent acts were mostly aimed at terrorizing civilian population, while attacks on state infrastructure accounted for only a small portion of the total. The terror action was limited to Galicia, and did not take place in Volhynia.

=== Government response ===
In response, Polish authorities decided to pacify the turbulent province. The decision to carry out the action was made by Marshal Józef Piłsudski in his capacity as Prime Minister of the Second Polish Republic. According to historian Roman Wysocki, the acts of sabotage merely served as a pretext for the pacifications with them being chiefly aimed at distracting the government's critics in the run up to elections. Recognizing that terrorist actions carried out by the OUN did not amount to an insurrection, Piłsudski ordered a police action, rather than a military one, and deputized the Minister of Interior, Felicjan Sławoj Składkowski with its organization. Sławoj Składkowski in turn ordered regional police commanders to prepare for it in the Lwów Voivodeship, Stanisławów Voivodeship and Tarnopol Voivodeship. The commander of the planned action was Lwów Voivodeship's chief of police, Czesław Grabowski.

Before the action commenced, around 130 Ukrainian activists, including a few dozen former Sejm (Polish parliament) deputies were arrested. Among those detained were not only Ukrainians, but also Polish politicians opposed to Piłsudski's government, including former prime minister Wincenty Witos. The action itself began on 14 September 1930, in several villages of Lwów Voivodeship, where the 14th Jazlowiec Uhlan Regiment was directed, even though the detailed plan for the action was not established until 18 September.

== Forces involved ==
From 20 to 29 September, 17 companies of police (60 policemen each) were used. Of these, 9 came from the police academy in Mosty Wielkie (Velyki Mosty), 3 from Lwów Voivodeship, 2.5 from Stanisławów Voivodeship, 2.5 from Tarnopol Voivodeship (a total of 1,041 policemen and officers). The main operations with the participation of military units took place in the first half of October.

Overall, the action affected:

- Lwów Voivodeship: police action - 206 places in 9 different counties, military action - 78 places in 8 different counties.
- Stanisławów Voivodeship: police action - 56 places in 2 counties, military action - 33 places in one county
- Tarnopol Voivodeship - police action - 63 places in 4 counties, military action - 57 places in 5 counties.

Or in total 494 villages. Timothy Snyder and other sources give the figure of 1000 policemen used in the operation, affecting 450 villages.

== Nature of the action ==
The operation was carried out in three stages. First, a basic edict was issued authorizing a particular action. Second, police units were brought in. Third units of the regular army carried out "operational maneuvers".

The pacification involved the search of private homes as well as buildings in which Ukrainian organizations (including the Ukrainian Greek Catholic Church) were based. During the search, the buildings, belongings, and property of Ukrainians were destroyed and the inhabitants were often beaten and arrested. Several Ukrainian schools (in Rohat, Drohobycz, Lwów, Tarnopol and Stanisławów) were closed and the Ukrainian Youth Scout organization Plast was outlawed. On 10 September, five deputies of Ukrainian National Democratic Alliance were arrested.

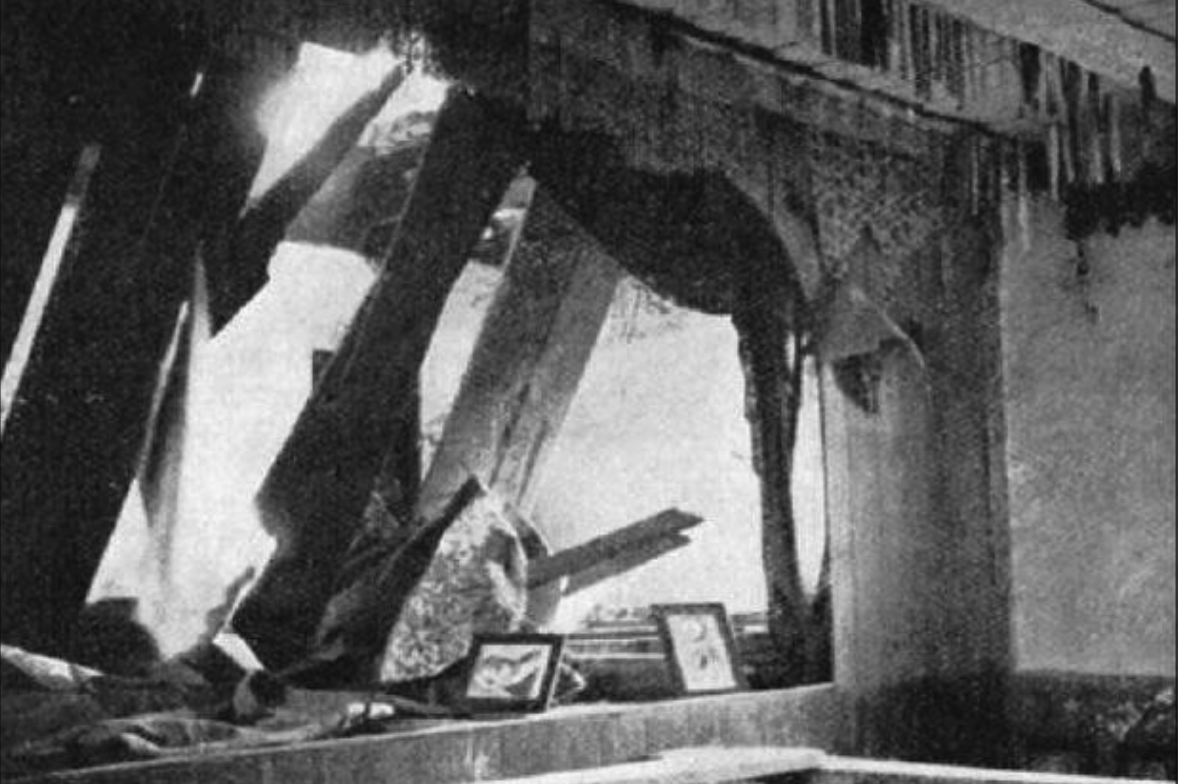
A destroyed reading hall of Prosvita in Lviv district, October 1930

The pacification was carried out by first surrounding a village with police units, then calling out the village elder or an administrator of the village. He in turn was informed about the purpose of the operation and was ordered to give up any weapons or explosives hidden in the village. All villagers were to remain in their houses. Subsequently, the houses of those suspected of cooperation with Organization of Ukrainian Nationalists were searched, which included the tearing up of floors and ceilings. During the course of the search, the furniture and property inside the houses were often destroyed. Policemen found about 100 kilograms of explosives and weapons (1287 rifles, 566 revolvers, 31 grenades). Also, during the searches, physical force was used and many people were beaten. According to Polish historian Władysław Pobóg-Malinowski, there were no fatalities, while, according to Ukrainian historian and an OUN member, Petro Mirchuk, 35 Ukrainian civilians died during the pacification. Stephan Horak estimates the number of victims at 7. Additional punishments included levying special "contributions" on the villages and stationing regiments of cavalry in the village, which had to be fed and quartered by the villages.

In course of the pacification property of many Ukrainian businesses such as trade cooperatives was damaged by Polish authorities. During a "revision" in Buchach, gendarmes destroyed large amounts of sugar, groat, tea, spices, textiles and other goods by mixing them with oil, and devastated the chancellery of the local cooperative, producing a damage of 22,000 złotys. This exacerbated the already dire financial state of the Ukrainian population following the Great Depression.

Ukrainian nationalists lodged an official complaint regarding the "pacification" action to a committee of the League of Nations, which in its response disapproved the methods used by the Polish authorities, but also put blame on the Ukrainian extremist elements for consciously provoking this reaction from the Polish government. The committee concluded that the pacification did not constitute the governmental policy of persecution of the Ukrainian minority.

== Effects of the action ==
The operation resulted in a reduction of Ukrainian terrorist actions carried out by the OUN for a short while, but, just as the OUN had planned, contributed to the growth of antagonism between Ukrainians and Poles. On the other hand, however, some Ukrainian activists criticized the methods used by the OUN (e.g., Petliurites, some members of the UNDO). The OUN also gained increased funding from the Weimar Republic and the Nazi Germany. Tensions in Polish–Ukrainian relations were escalated by Ukrainian nationalist periodicals. The Ukrainian nationalist newspaper Rozbudova Natsii appealed to the Ukrainian nation in the following words:

“A new war is coming, and we must prepare for it. When that day arrives, we will be merciless; we will see the rising of Zalizniaks and Gontas, and no one will find mercy, and the poet will be able to sing ‘a father murdered his own son.’ We will not investigate who is without guilt—like the Bolsheviks, we will first shoot, and only afterwards try and carry out investigations."

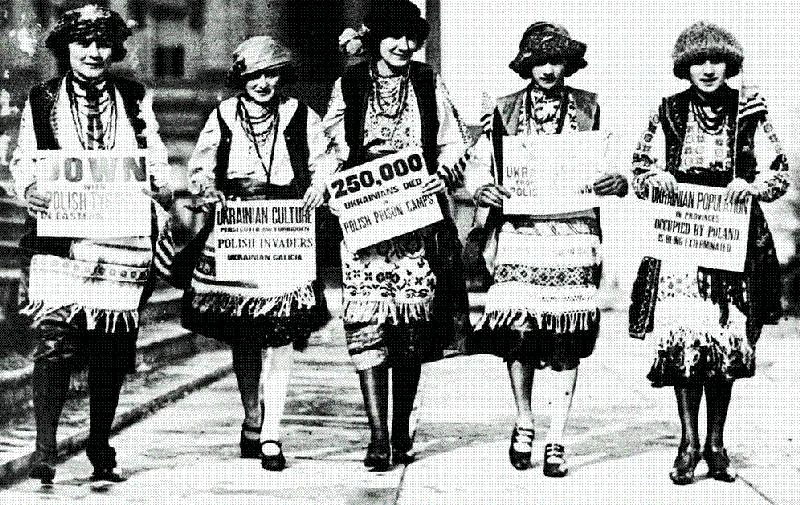
Members of Ukrainian diaspora protesting against the Pacification in 1930

The OUN continued its terroristic activities and engaged in numerous assassinations. Some of those murdered by the OUN after the Pacification included Tadeusz Hołówko, a Polish politician who promoted support for the Ukrainian minority's culture and education, advocating legal protections and policies to preserve their identity and foster peaceful coexistence, Emilian Czechowski, Lwów's Polish police commissioner, Alexei Mailov, a Soviet consular official killed in retaliation for the Holodomor, and most notably Bronisław Pieracki, the Polish interior minister. The OUN also killed moderate Ukrainian figures such as the respected teacher (and former officer of the Ukrainian Galician Army of the West Ukrainian People's Republic) Ivan Babij.

According to Ukrainian-Canadian historian, Orest Subtelny, "collective punishment" meted out on thousands of "mostly innocent peasants" resulted in the exacerbation of animosity between the Polish state and the Ukrainian minority.

== In culture ==
A woodcut depicting a scene from the Pacification in a Ukrainian village was created by Polish-born Ukrainian artist Sofiya Nalepinska-Boychuk in 1930.

== Bibliography ==
- Wysocki, Roman (2003). Organizacja ukraińskich nacjonalistów w Polsce w latach 1929-1939: geneza, struktura, program, ideologia [The Organisation of Ukrainian Nationalists in Poland in 1929-1939: Genesis, Structure, Programme, Ideology] (in Polish). Lublin: UMCS Publishing House.
