= Lipitsa culture =

Dacian archaeological culture

Map of Roman Dacia showing Costoboci, Carpi and Free Dacians

Lipitsa culture (Ukrainian: Липицька Lypytska; Romanian: Lipița; Polish: Lipica; German: Lipitza) is the archaeological material culture supposedly representative of a Dacian tribe. (Note: The enhtholihgiustic associaltion of both the culture and the supposedly connected tribe of Costoboci is uncertain, but the majority opinion favors the Dacian hypothesis.) It took its name from the Ukrainian village of Verkhnya Lypytsya, Ivano-Frankivsk Raion, Ivano-Frankivsk Oblast.

== Geography ==
It is located on the Upper Dniester and Middle Dniester, Upper Prut, in the Carpathians and Subcarpathians of today’s Bukovina, Pokuttya, Galicia, Transcarpathia and Maramureș. It lasted from the middle of the 1st century BC to the beginning of the 3rd century AD.

== Lipitsa type site ==
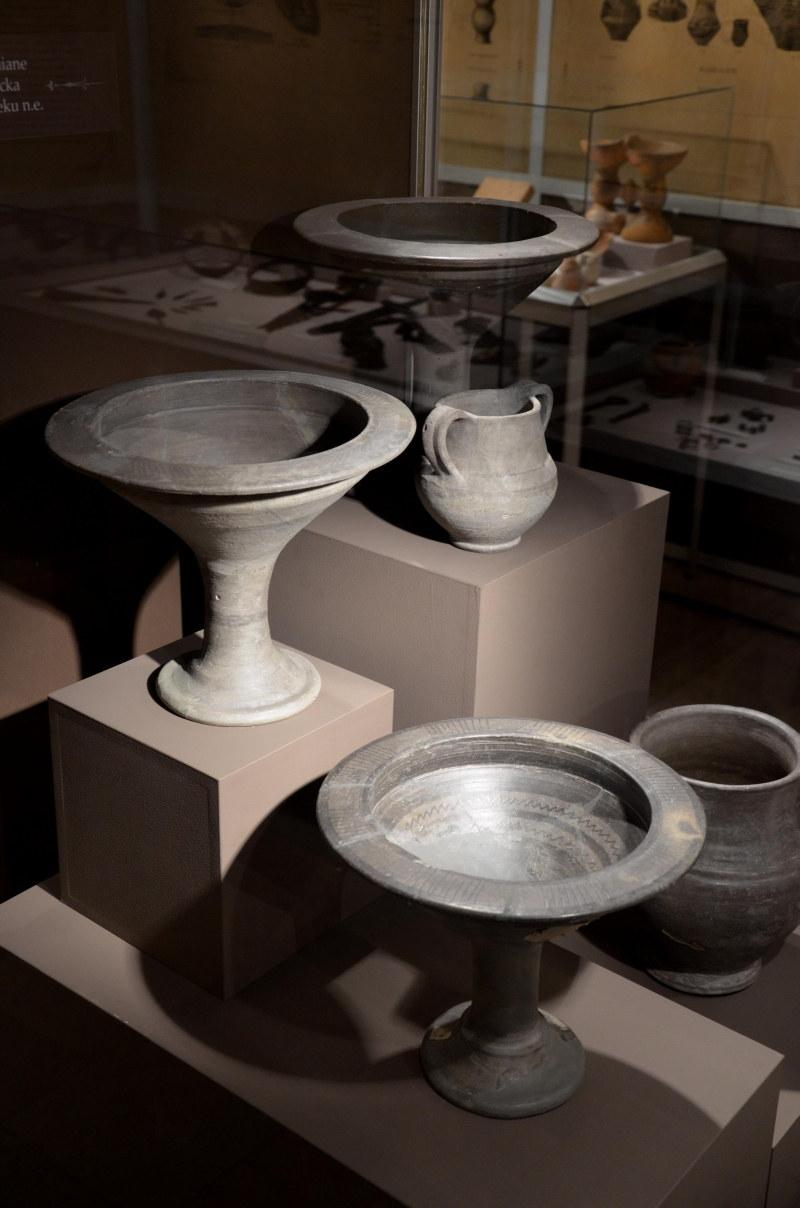
2nd century pottery of the Lipitsa culture in display at the Archaeological Museum of Kraków.

Smiszko (1932), Kostrzewski (1949), Sulimirski (1972), Cigilik (1975), Kozak (1989 and 2006), Shchukin (1989 and 2006) explicitly assign to it a Dacian / North Thracian origin. Still in the early Roman period, this Thracian population was dominated by strong Celtic influences or had simply absorbed Celtic ethnic components One of the most recent settlements on Dniester that is associated with Lipitsa culture is in Remezivtsi that existed before the early third century.

"Flat" cremation cemeteries are typical of this culture. And, along these a few graves have been discovered which differ markedly i.e. richly furnished inhumation burials in ancient mounds with equipment consisting of imported Roman vases and other goods, with a few articles typical of the Celtic culture. The pottery from these burials was a typical Lipitsa ware. Buried in the graves were evidently members of the ruling class of the Lipitsa culture, presumably of Celtic origin.

Like other pagan Dacians and Thracians, the Lipitsa people cremated their deceased. The remains were buried in a plane or tumular tomb. Only children were inhumed; as they hadn't passed a come of age passage ritual, due to their age, they couldn't be incinerated. These burial customs lasted from the late La Tène and were best preserved in the Upper Tisza basin, a region with a major Dacian cultural perpetuation throughout the ages.

The presence in Kolokolin (Ukraine, Ivano-Frankivsk Oblast) and Chizhikovo (Ukraine, (Chyzhykove)) of Dacian pottery made some scholars to include also these memorials of those sites in the Lipitsa culture of the upper Dniester, which was as linked to it by the Dacian tribe of the Costoboci. Benadik and Kolnik sensing the similarity of these burials to the Zemplin burial ground, included the latter in the Lipitsa culture. However, these burials date from a slightly earlier period, and possess typological difference which makes their inclusion into the Lipitsa culture unlikely.

== Culture and trade ==
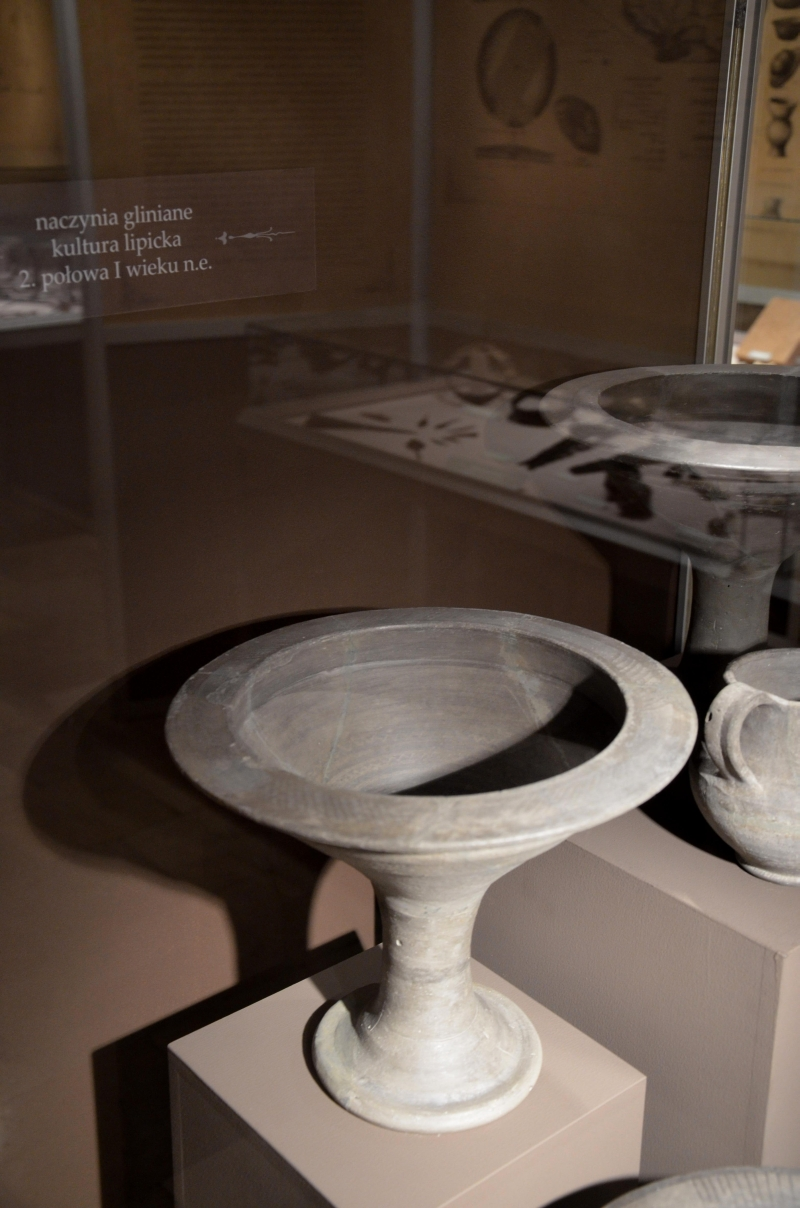
2nd century pottery of the Lipitsa culture in display at the Archaeological Museum of Kraków.

Lipitsa culture is considered by the majority of scholars as representing the Dacian tribe of Costoboci.

Roman influences are also visible in the material culture. Likewise, Germanic people from the Przeworsk culture, but also Celts and Sarmatians, came in contact with the Lipitsa people. It seems that no Early Slavs made contact with this area yet, as the first Slavic artifacts in today's Moldavia and Bukovina are not dated earlier than the 5th and 6th centuries AD.

In the first decades of the 3rd century, Lipitsa culture of the Costoboci restricted its territory and gave birth to a new archaeological culture, that of the Carpathian Tumuli culture. A part of the Costoboci inhabiting the Subcarpathian hills withdrew southwards into the mountains, while a small part migrated in Moldavia, joining the Carpi, another Dacian tribe. In any case, some did remain in the northern area of the Lipitsa culture, despite the pressure of the newly arrived East Germanic tribes.

The largest part of the territory of Lipitsa and Carpathian Tumuli archaeological cultures is now inhabited by the Hutsuls, both in Ukraine and in Romania.
