= Shchuka =

Shchuka (literally means 'pike' in Russian) may refer to:

- Akula-class submarine
- Shchuka-class submarine
- Victor-class submarine

== See also ==
- Shuka, Hindu rishi; main narrator of the Bhagavata Purana
- Szczuka, a village in Kuyavian-Pomeranian Voivodeship, Poland
- Szczuka (surname)
- Shchukin
