= Kniahynychi =

Kniahynychi Княгиничі
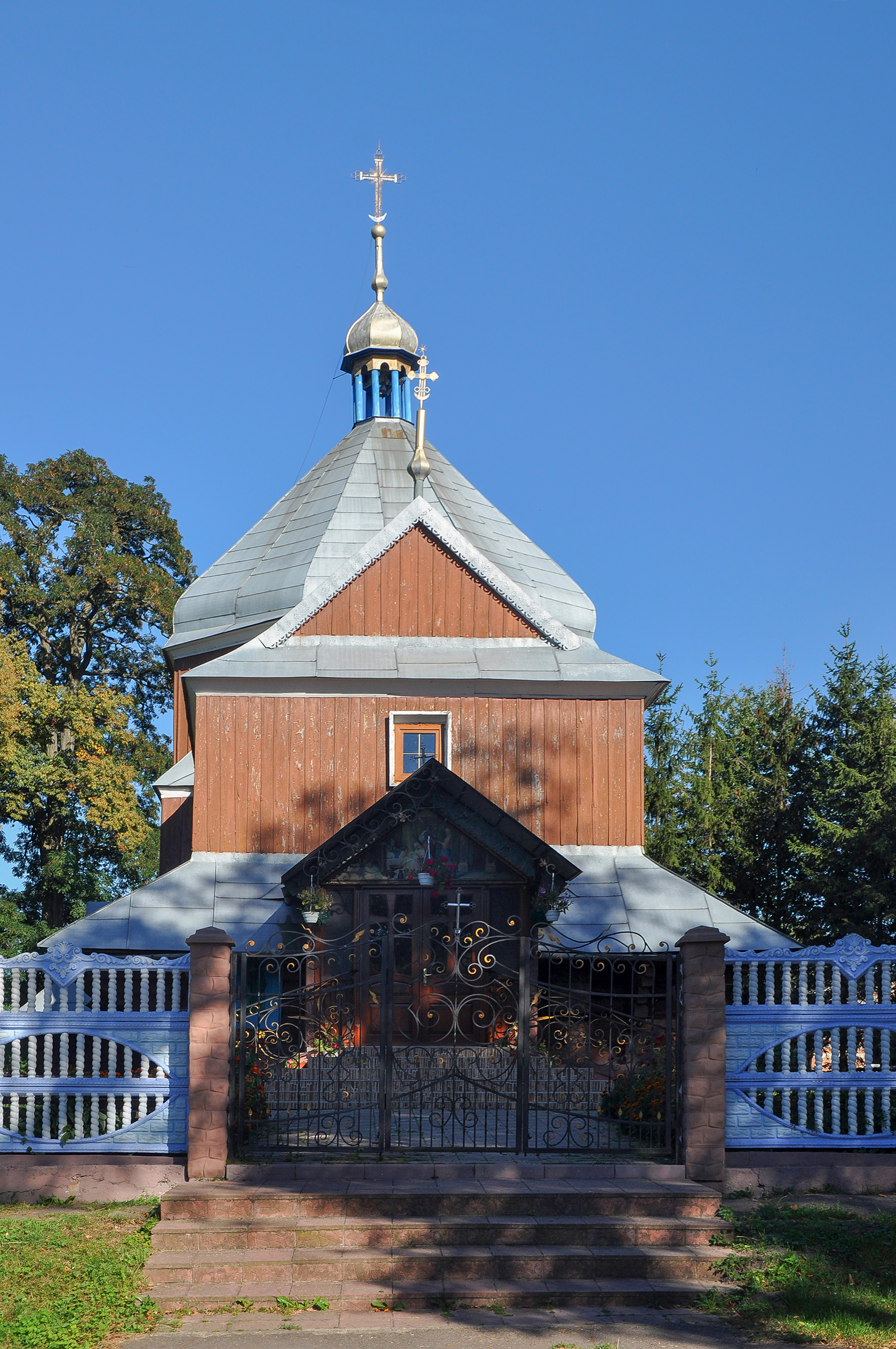
- Wooden church in Kniahynychi

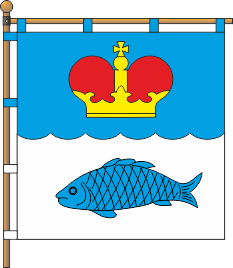
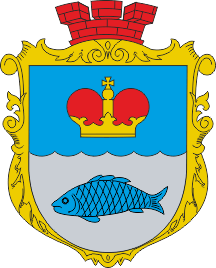
- Flag Coat of arms

- Location within Ivano-Frankivsk Oblast Location within Ukraine
- Country: Ukraine
- Oblast: Ivano-Frankivsk Oblast
- Raion: Ivano-Frankivsk Raion
- Hromada: Rohatyn urban hromada
- Established: 1430

Area
  - Total: 8.86 km^{2} (3.42 sq mi)
- Elevation: 274 m (899 ft)

Population
  - Total: 718
  - Density: 81.0/km^{2} (210/sq mi)
- Time zone: UTC+2 (EET)
  - Summer (DST): UTC+3 (EEST)
- Postal code: 77030
- Area code: +380 3435

Kniahynychi (Knyahynychi; Ukrainian: Княгиничі; Polish: Knihynicze) is a village in Ivano-Frankivsk Raion, Ivano-Frankivsk Oblast near Rohatyn. It belongs to Rohatyn urban hromada, one of the hromadas of Ukraine. Its population in 2001 was 718 people.

== History ==
The village had an important Jewish population before World War II.

Until 18 July 2020, Kniahynychi belonged to Rohatyn Raion. The raion was abolished in July 2020 as part of the administrative reform of Ukraine, which reduced the number of raions of Ivano-Frankivsk Oblast to six. The area of Rohatyn Raion was merged into Ivano-Frankivsk Raion.

=== Jewish population until the Holocaust ===
According to the single document of Kniahynychi's Jewish history, during World War I the annals of the Jewish community were destroyed, but some stories were preserved, indicating that the community was over 300 years old.

In 1915, during World War I, as the Imperial Russian Army retreated, all male Jews were deported, including the Rabbi (Berel Weiss). In 1918 the men returned but were continuously harassed and many families left for Argentina, the US, or Palestine. The remaining hundreds of Jewish families did not survive WWII, killed by the Ukrainian militia and the German forces.
