= Szczuka (surname) =

Szczuka ("pike" in Old Polish) is a Polish surname. Notable people with this surname include:

- Kazimiera Szczuka (born 1966), Polish writer and television personality
- Mieczysław Szczuka (1898–1927), Polish artist and mountaineer
- Stanisław Antoni Szczuka (1654–1710), Polish politician and writer

== See also ==
- Shchuka
