= Avraham Brandwein =

Israeli rabbi

Rabbi Avraham Brandwein (Hebrew: אברהם ברנדווין; died February 20, 2013), Admor of Stretin, was an Israeli Kabbalah scholar.

== Family and early life ==
Brandwein's family includes many chassidic masters, including the Maggid of Mezritsch, Elimelech of Lizhensk and Levy Yitschak of Berditshev, and he was directly descended from the first Admor of Stretin. Brandwein was born in Israel, the seventh generation in his family to live there. His family originally settled in Tsfat, the city of Kabbalists.

His father, Rav Yehudah Tzvi, was the previous Admor and a scholar of Kabbalah.

Brandwein served in the Israel Defense Forces in artillery and was among the soldiers that crossed the Suez Canal into Egypt during the Yom Kippur War.

== Ordination ==
Brandwein was ordained as a Rabbi by Gedolim representing the entire Orthodox community in Israel, and also holds an M.A. He integrated Charedi life with active participation in the life of the modern state. Brandwein served as a rabbi in the Absorption and Immigration Department of the Jewish Agency, providing spiritual assistance to recent immigrants.

== Teaching and writing ==
From 1985, Brandwein taught Torah and Chassidut throughout Israel. He edited more than 20 volumes of classical Kabbalistic texts. He established a yeshiva in the Jewish Quarter of the Old City of Jerusalem where he taught Kabbalah. He wrote the book "The Essence of Religion and its Purpose" Commentary by "Or Hadash" Hebrew for New Light (Book Title in Hebrew "Mehut HaDat UMatrata") based on Rav Ashlag's article of the same name.

== Death ==
Brandwein died on February 20, 2013 (Hebrew Date Lunar Calendar is 10th of Adar), aged 67, in the Hadassah Medical Center in Ein Kerem in Jerusalem, after several months' illness. He was buried in the Mount of Olives Jewish Cemetery, next to his wife, Tzipora, who had died four years earlier.
