= Carpathian Tumuli culture =

Archaeological culture in the Carpathian Mountains

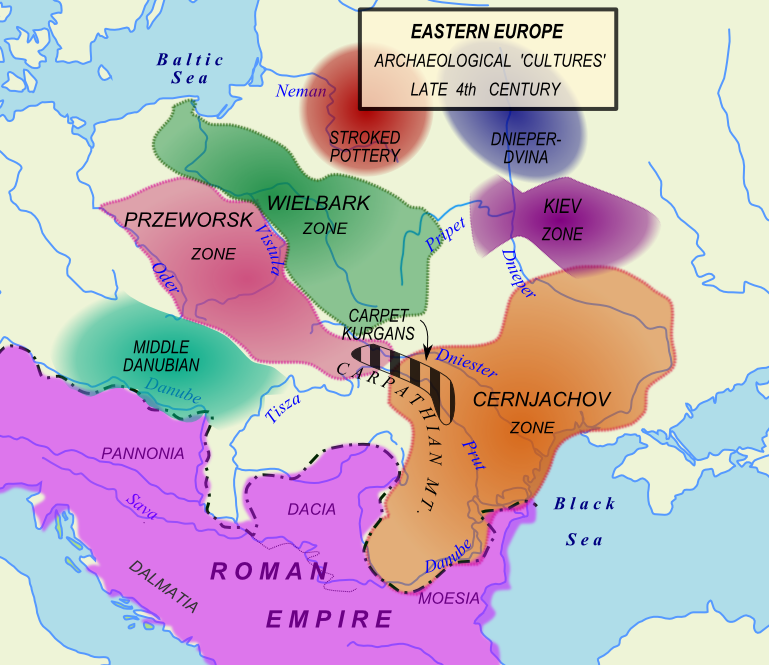
Carpathian Tumuli culture

The Carpathian Tumuli culture (or "Carpathian Kurgan culture") is the name given to an archaeological culture which evolved in the parts of the Carpathian Mountains between the end of the 2nd and end of the 4th century AD. It was less vast than the area occupied by the Lipiţa culture, encompassing today's Pokuttya, Maramureş, Bucovina and to a lesser extent, Northwest Moldova.

The arrival of East Germanic tribes in the Upper Dniester region forced the Costoboci to withdraw or crowd into the Carpathians at the end of the 2nd century AD and the beginning of the 3rd, where a part of them were already living. Other groups migrated to the area of the Carpi people (Moldova) or remained to live together with the newly arrived peoples of the Przeworsk culture.

Most of the material evidence of the culture suggests it was Dacian. Tumuli tomb building disappeared from Roman Dacia with the coming of Imperial administration, but it continued to exist in the unconquered north of Dacia, a sign that the local population kept its ancestral traditions. The demarcation line is fairly clear, since the neighbour Przeworsk peoples did not have tumular tombs. As in the Lipiţa culture, the dead were cremated and their ashes were put in urns which were buried in the tumuli. The difference with the Carpathian Tumuli culture is that plane tombs are no longer found, but only (or almost only) tumular tombs.

After Roman emperor Theodosius I defeated the neighbouring Carpi people in 381 AD, the people of the Carpathian Tumuli culture lost an important ally and this archaeological culture dissipates soon after, its place being taken by another one, the Sântana de Mureș–Chernyakhov culture, which also replaces the Poieneşti – Lucaşevca culture in the Northwestern Moldavian Subcarpathians, formed by the Bastarnae between the Costoboci and the Carpi.
