= Verkhnia Lypytsia =

Rural locality in Ivano-Frankivsk Oblast, Ukraine

Coordinates: 49°21′N 24°47′E

Verkhnia Lypytsia (Ukrainian: Верхня Липиця, literally "Upper Lypytsya"), also Upper Lipitsa, is a village in Ivano-Frankivsk Raion, Ivano-Frankivsk Oblast, Ukraine. It belongs to Rohatyn urban hromada, one of the hromadas of Ukraine.

Close to the village there is an Iron Age archaeological site, which gives its name to the Lipitsa culture.

Until 18 July 2020, Verkhnia Lypytsia belonged to Rohatyn Raion. The raion was abolished in July 2020 as part of the administrative reform of Ukraine, which reduced the number of raions of Ivano-Frankivsk Oblast to six. The area of Rohatyn Raion was merged into Ivano-Frankivsk Raion.
