= Rohatyn =

Urban locality in Ivano-Frankivsk Oblast, Ukraine

Rohatyn Рогатин
- City
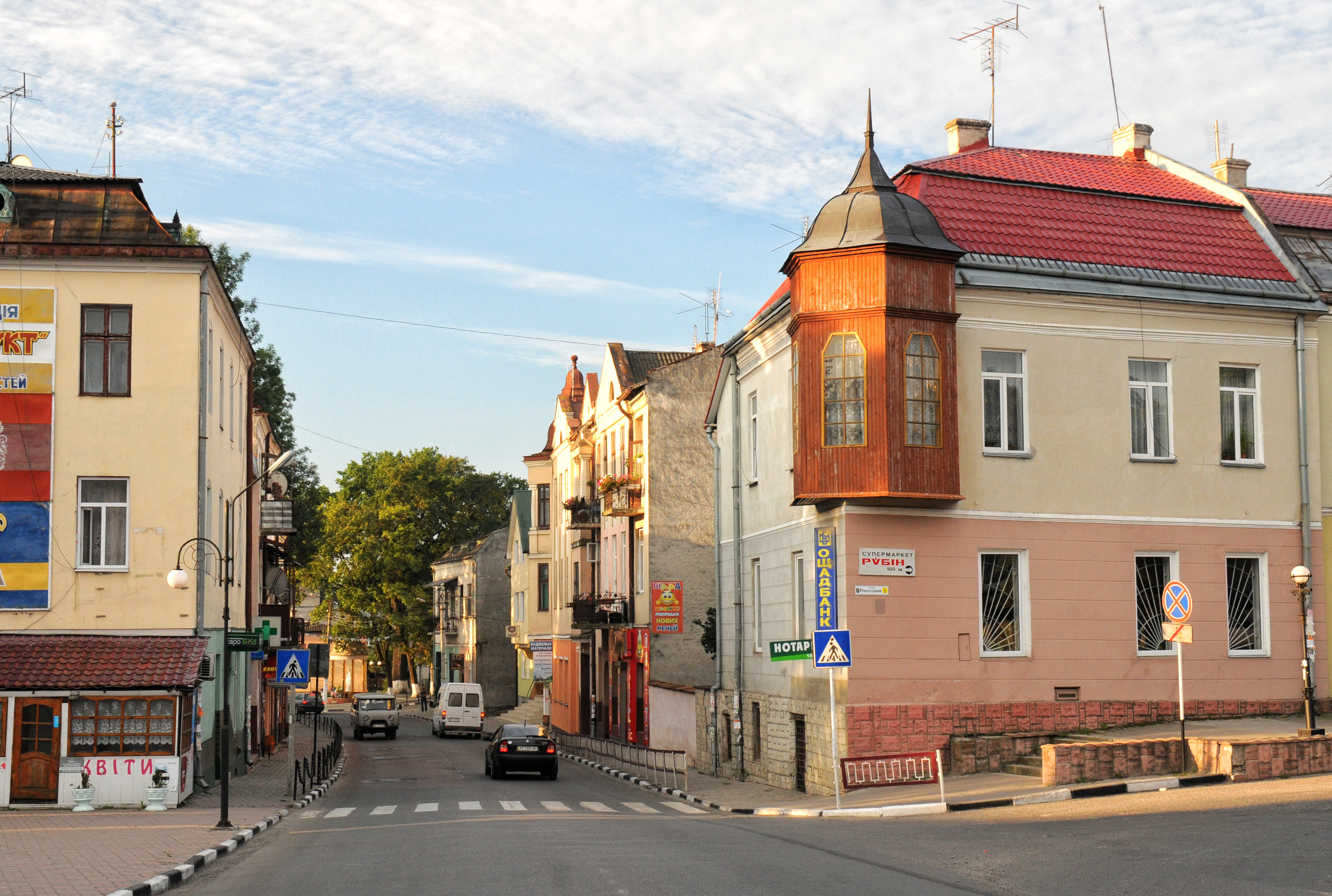
- Roksolany Square

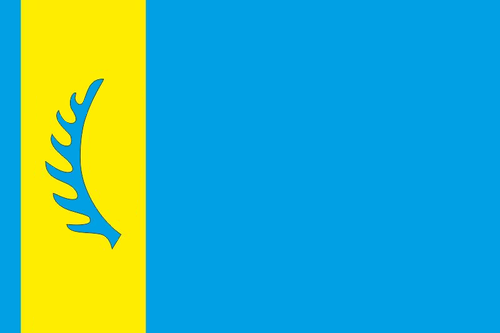
- Flag Coat of arms

- Location of Rohatyn within Ukraine Rohatyn (Ukraine)
- Coordinates: 49°25′N 24°37′E
- Country: Ukraine
- Oblast: Ivano-Frankivsk Oblast
- Raion: Ivano-Frankivsk Raion
- Hromada: Rohatyn urban hromada
- Founded: 12th century

Population (2022)
  - Total: 7,521
  - Estimate (2025): ▼7,581
- Website: www.rohatyn.ronet.com.ua

Rohatyn (Ukrainian: Рогатин, IPA: [roɦɐˈtɪn]; Polish: Rohatyn) is a city located on the Hnyla Lypa River in Ivano-Frankivsk Raion, Ivano-Frankivsk Oblast, in western Ukraine. It hosts the administration of Rohatyn urban hromada, one of the hromadas of Ukraine. Population: 7,521 (2022 estimate).

== Name ==
It was first mentioned in historical documents in 1184 as a part of the Kingdom of Galicia–Volhynia. Its name seems to be derived from Ruthenia, the name of the region of the location. However, the town emblem has a horn of a deer which gives the first part of the Slavic name of Rohatyn or Rogatyn – "Rog" ("Horn"). The second part "Tyn" can be connected with a word which means "Stacket". Together these two words give us "Horn Stacket".

Also, there is a legend connected with the image of the deer horn of the town emblem. It is said that a wife of the Duke Jaroslav Osmomysl, being lost in a forest, met a deer. She survived by following the deer out of the forest. A fort was built with name "Rogach" ("Deer") on the place where the duchess supposedly stepped out of the forest.

The town name also can be connected with the Slavic word "Rogatyna" which means a heavy spear for martial arts or bear hunting ("Bear Spear"). It was first mentioned in 1149 (Laurentian Chronicle). In Polish heraldry "Rogacina" means "Broadhead".

== History ==
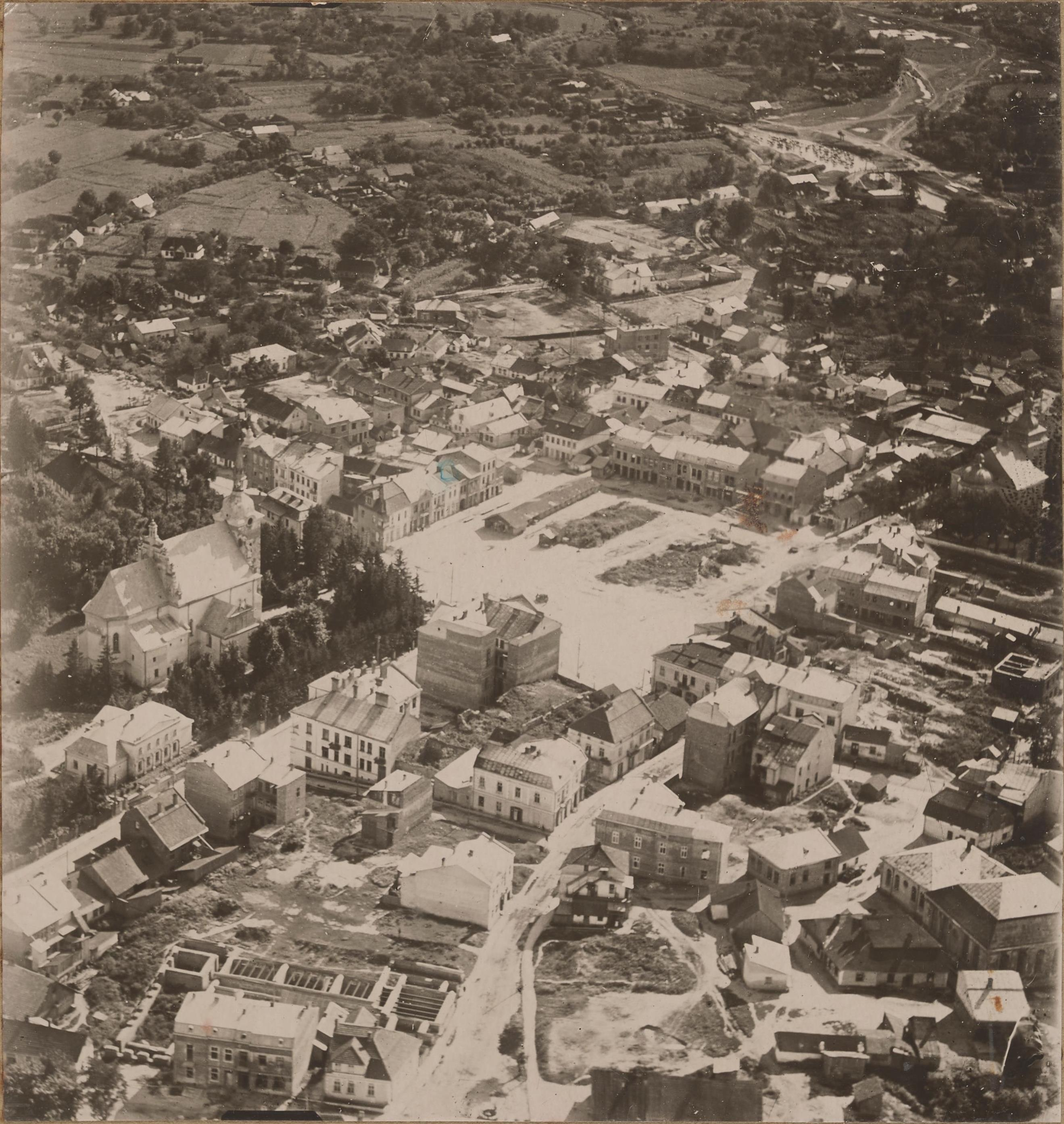
Aerial view of Rohatyn in the interbellum

In 1415, under Polish rule, it was granted Magdeburg rights, and subsequently developed into an important trading and manufacturing town. In 1520, the region was attacked by Crimean Tatars, Roxelana, a native of Rohatyn, was captured and sold to the Ottoman court, where she became Suleiman the Magnificent's concubine, and later legal wife and haseki sultan. In the 16th century a renowned school of icon painting arose in Rohatyn, and in the 1580s an Orthodox brotherhood was founded obtaining the stauropegion (a monastery exempt from the control of the local bishop) status. After the First Partition of Poland in 1772, Rohatyn was annexed by Austria, and became a county center. A Ukrainian gymnasium was established there in 1909, and a minor theological seminary in 1931. In 1910, half of the town population was Jewish. During the interwar period the town was under Polish rule.

Historical population
Year	Pop.	±%
1921	5,736	—
1931	7,513	+31.0%
2022	7,521	+0.1%

Following the joint German-Soviet invasion of Poland, which started World War II in September 1939, the town was occupied by the Soviet Union until 1941, then by Germany until 1944, and re-occupied by the Soviet Union, which annexed it from Poland in 1945. In 1939, it became part of Soviet Ukraine and was granted city status.

Today Rohatyn is an important highway junction; 26 percent of its inhabitants work in the transportation industry.

Until 18 July 2020, Rohatyn was the administrative center of Rohatyn Raion. The raion was abolished in July 2020 as part of the administrative reform of Ukraine, which reduced the number of raions of Ivano-Frankivsk Oblast to six. The area of Rohatyn Raion was merged into Ivano-Frankivsk Raion.

The Books of Jacob, Nobel winner Olga Tokarczuk's magnum opus, begins in Rohatyn.

== Jewish Community ==
The Jewish settlement in the city was likely established during the 15th and 16th centuries. Jews suffered from a lack of rights until a Charter of Privileges (granting formal rights) was issued on March 27, 1633, by King Władysław IV Vasa. An organized Jewish community was established, headed by a council and an administrative staff, following a model similar to other contemporary Jewish communities in Poland. The community was part of the Council of Communities for the Lviv district.

During the period of Sabbatai Zevi’s activity in Poland, the Szor family, considered part of the movement's leadership, joined his cause. Rabbi Daṿid Mosheh Avraham ish Ṭrevish, Ashkenazi (known as Rabbi Adam) of Rohatyn became famous for his opposition to the Sabbatean supporters. Later, the Szor family became part of the leadership of the Jacob Frank movement; family members Solomon Szor and his father Elisha Szor participated in the famous 1759 disputation between the Jews and the Frankists. The involvement of the Szor family of Rohatyn in Frankism was later dramatized in Olga Tokarczuk’s novel, The Books of Jacob.

Rabbi Uri of Rohatyn, founder of a branch of the Stratyn Hasidic dynasty, died on Lag BaOmer in 1848. His grave became a major pilgrimage site in Eastern Europe for that holiday. Ahead of Lag BaOmer in 2013, the original headstone—which had been used as a paving stone following the desecration of the cemetery during World War II and the Communist era—was recovered and restored to its place. A large Hasidic community had existed in Rohatyn even earlier; notably, the Rabbi of Rohatyn around 1820 was Rabbi Moshe Yehoshua Heschel Orenstein, author of Yam HaTalmud.

In 1868, the Austrian government granted equal rights to the Jews. At the end of the 19th century, the Zionist movement began to take hold. A branch of "Bnei Zion" (Hovevei Zion) was established by Shalom Meltzer, who was elected to the national committee and later became a founder of the Mizrachi movement. The town saw the establishment of the first Hebrew school in Galicia (1905). Renowned scholars taught in its educational system, including Rafael Schermann, founder of the Hebrew Teachers' Union in Poland, and the writer Zvi Scharfstein. During World War I, in 1914, the Jewish quarter was set on fire by the Russian army, and a large portion of the Jewish population was exiled.

== The Holocaust ==
On the eve of World War II, approximately 3,000 Jews lived in Rohatyn, accounting for about half of its inhabitants. They earned their living primarily through trade, crafts, and professional services. Following the occupation of Rohatyn by the Red Army on September 18, 1939, Jewish communal and political activities ceased, and only the synagogues remained open.

During Operation Barbarossa in July 1941, the town was captured by the Germans. A Judenrat was established, headed by Shlomo Amarant. At the end of 1941, a ghetto was created, to which Jews from the surrounding area were brought. Jews from the villages of Potok, Zalipie, Czercze, Babince, and Pidkamin were deported to the ghetto. Later, Jews from Burshtyn, Bukachivtsi, Kniahynychi, Khodoriv, Bolshivtsi, Lipice Gorne, and Lipice Dolne were also sent there. An underground movement operated within the ghetto, and three groups of partisans were active in the district's forests.

- March 20, 1942: Approximately 2,000 Jews were murdered in shooting pits near the local railway station.
- September 2, 1942: A transport of about 1,000 Jews was sent to the Belzec extermination camp.
- December 1942: Another transport of 1,500 Jews was dispatched.

The extermination of the Jews was carried out by SS officer Hans Krüger and his men from the Stanislavov SS station. On June 6, 1943, the ghetto was set on fire by the Germans and Ukrainian collaborators. Over three days, the remaining Jews were hunted down and taken to pits in the cemetery, where they were shot.

During the liquidation of the ghetto, numerous pre-prepared bunkers and hiding places were discovered. The camouflage of these bunkers made them difficult for the Germans to find, and many were only uncovered through informants. This difficulty was documented in the report of SS-Gruppenführer Fritz Katzmann. This report, which details the attempt to uncover a central bunker nicknamed "Stalingrad," was presented as evidence during the Eichmann Trial. Another bunker, built under the basement of the Gestapo headquarters, became known after the war; most of its occupants managed to survive. In some cases, those hiding in the bunkers were armed and fought back when discovered.

Rohatyn was liberated by the Red Army on July 24, 1944. About 30 Jews from the town and surrounding villages survived by hiding in ghetto bunkers. Others survived by fleeing east during the initial occupation or by hiding in the forests. One notable case is the Schreyer (Sharir) family - Eliezer Itzhak and his two sons, who fled during the liquidation to their home village of Zhurove. They were hidden by a local villager named Mikhail Blagay, who knew the father from before the war. The family survived, and the two sons later lived in Israel. In January 2004, Mikhail Blagay and his wife were recognized by Yad Vashem as Righteous Among the Nations.

Following the war, the survivors emigrated to various locations, including Israel, the United States, and South America. Among the survivors was Alexander Kimel, who chronicled life in the ghetto in his writings.

== Monuments ==
- stone Church of the Nativity of the Theotokos (end of the 14th century)
- remnants of the town walls and gate from the 13th and 14th centuries
- wooden Church of the Holy Spirit (1644–1645) with a magnificent iconostasis (1647–1650) is on UNESCO world heritage list
- the ruins of the Dominican monastery (1614)
- Roman Catholic Saint Nicholas's Church in the Renaissance style (1666)
- wooden Saint Nicholas's Church (1729).
- Statue of Nastia Lisovska (Hürrem Sultan) (1999) replacement for a statue of Lenin

== Notable people ==
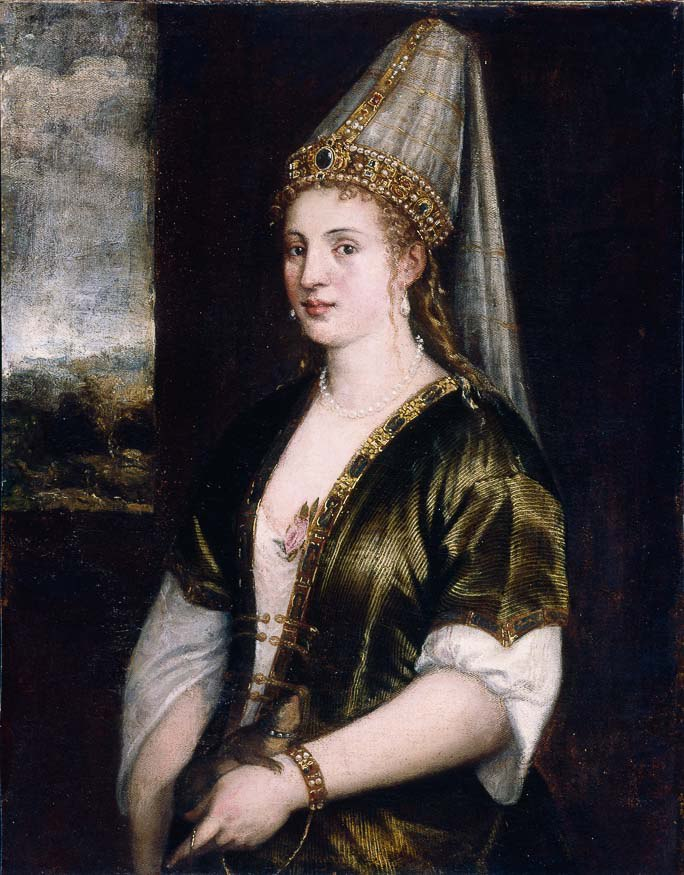
Hürrem Sultan, Chief Consort of Suleiman the Magnificent and the Haseki Sultan of the Ottoman Empire

- Hürrem Sultan (Roxelana), Chief consort of Ottoman Sultan Suleiman the Magnificent, first Haseki Sultan of the Ottoman Empire and the mother of Suleiman's successor Selim II. She initiated the period known as Sultanate of Women and became one of the most powerful and influential women in Ottoman and European History. She was one of the most influential women of the 16th century, influencing and ruling the state and foreign affairs of the Ottoman Empire with her husband.
- Lessia Leskiv, a Ukrainian sport shooter
- Ivan Krypiakevych, a Ukrainian historian, academician, professor of Lviv University and director of the Institute of Social Sciences of Ukraine, worked in Rohatyn.
- Sylvia Lederman, Holocaust survivor

== Gallery ==
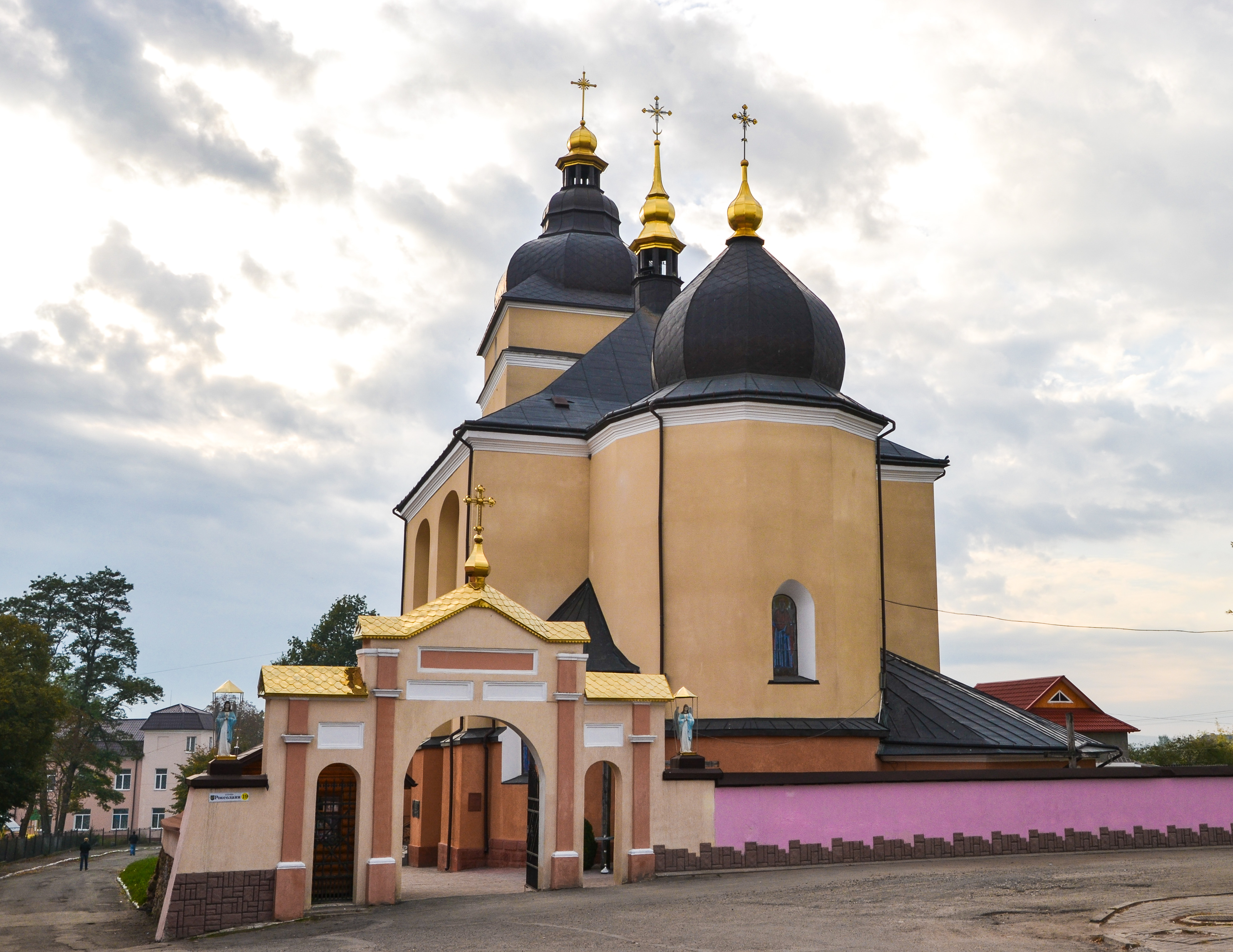
Nativity of Blessed Virgin Mary Ukrainian Catholic Church

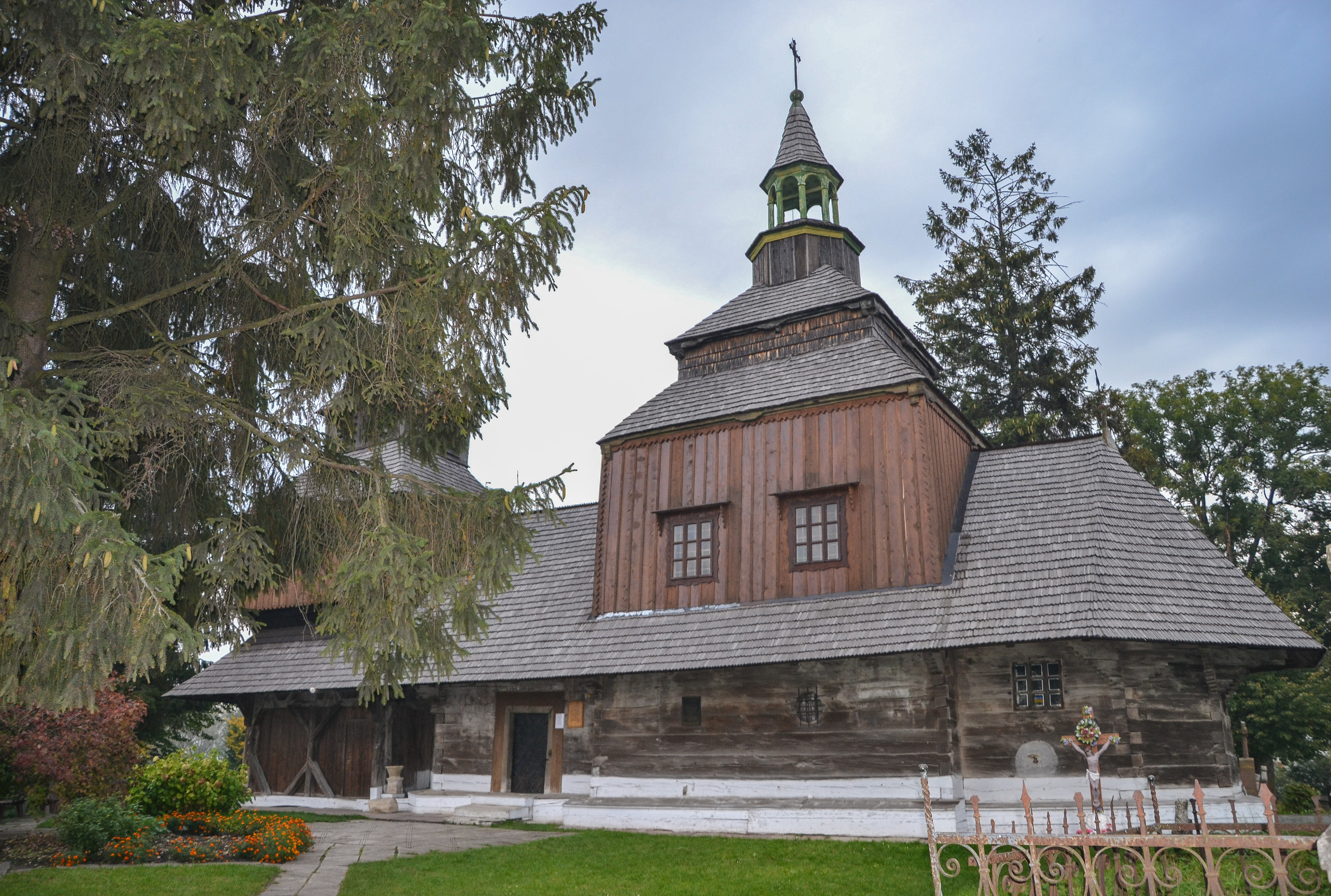
Holy Spirit Church

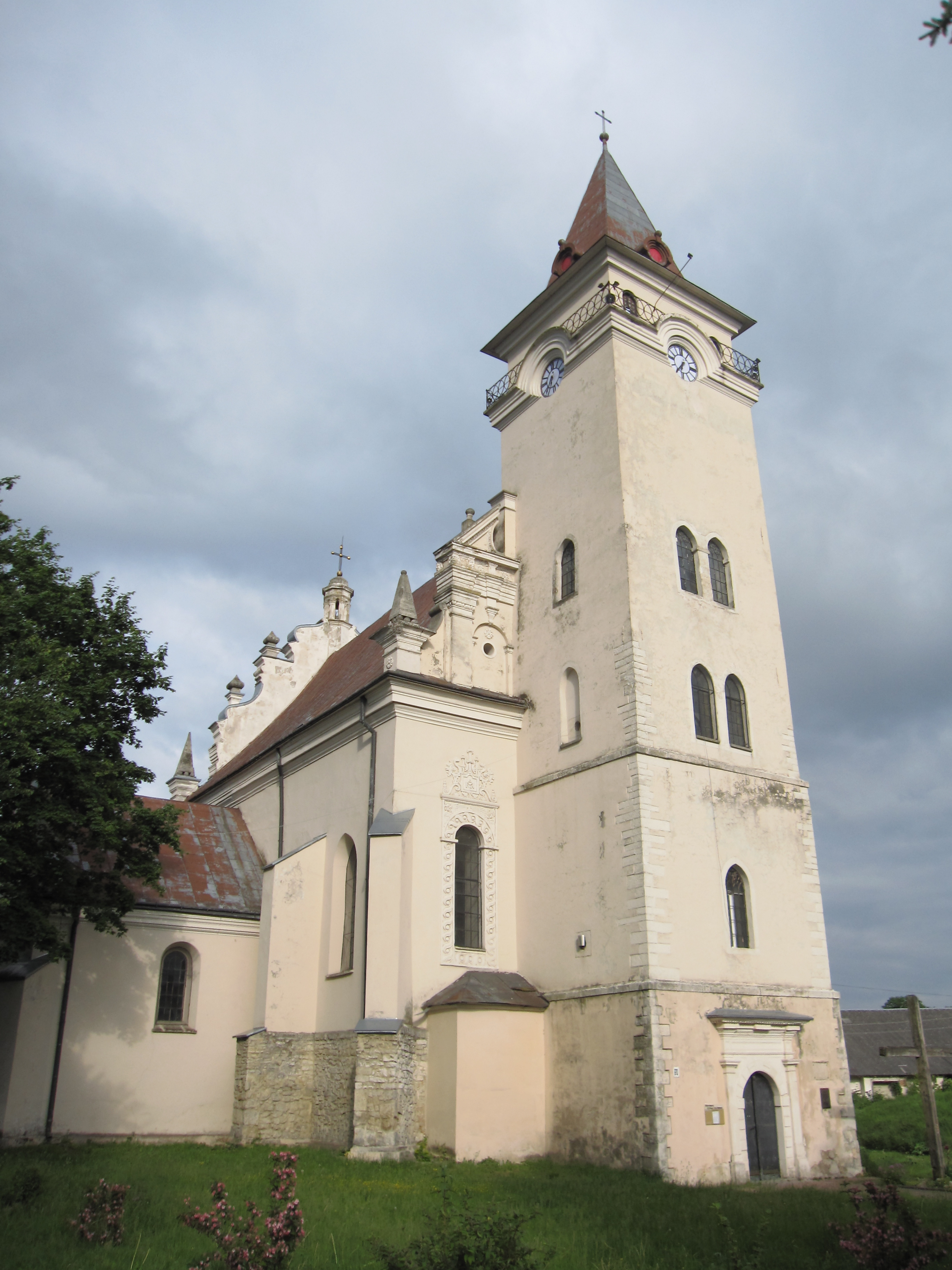
Catholic Saint Nicholas's Church

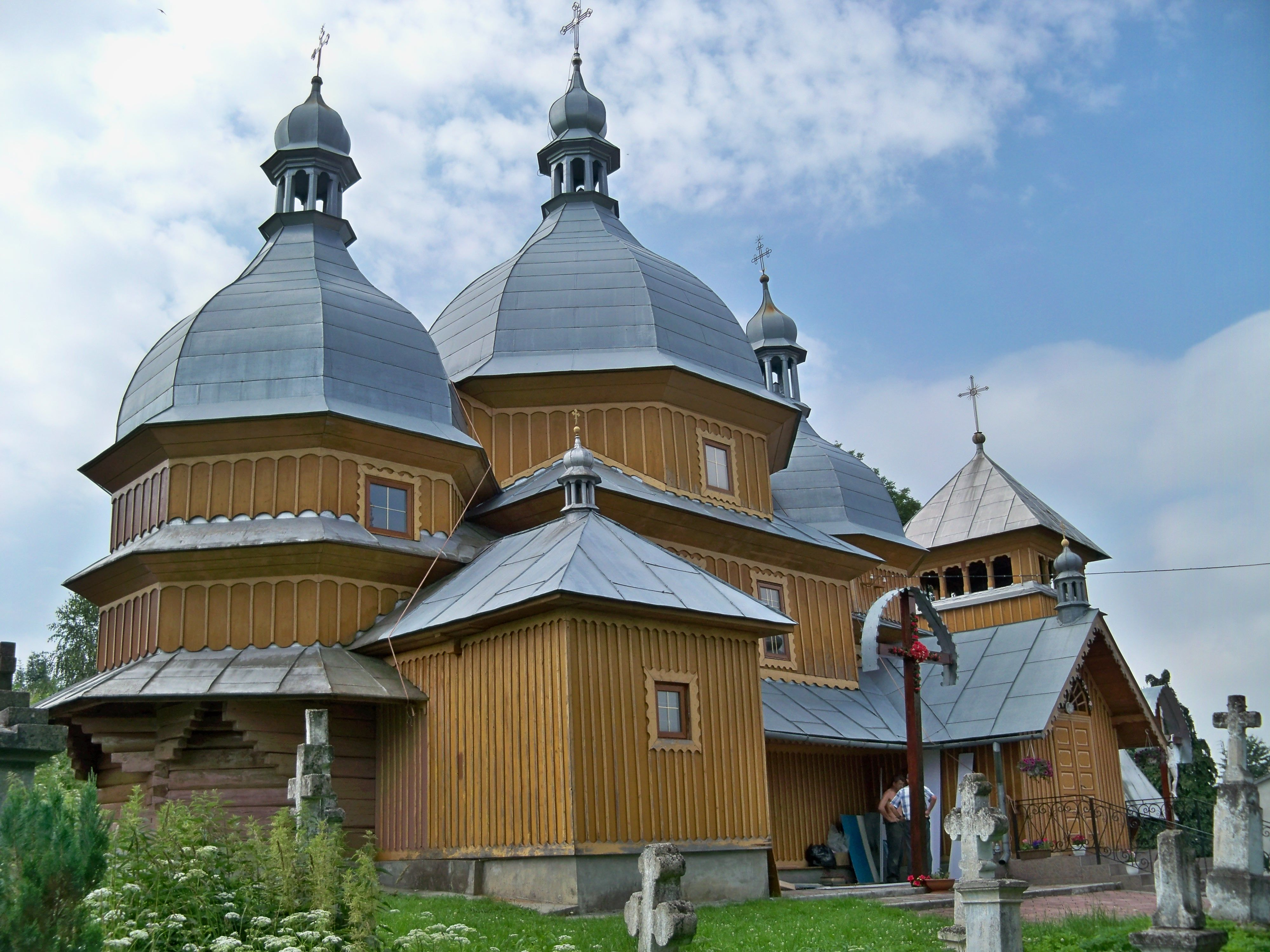
Church of Saint Nicholas

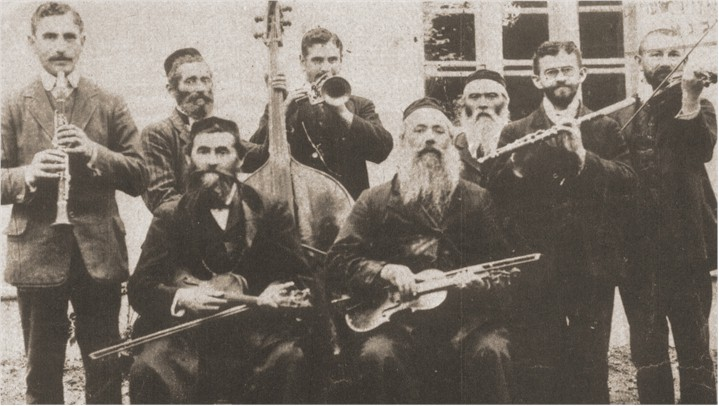
Faust Family Jewish musicians from Rohatyn, 1912

== Location ==
Local orientation

Regional orientation

== Notes ==
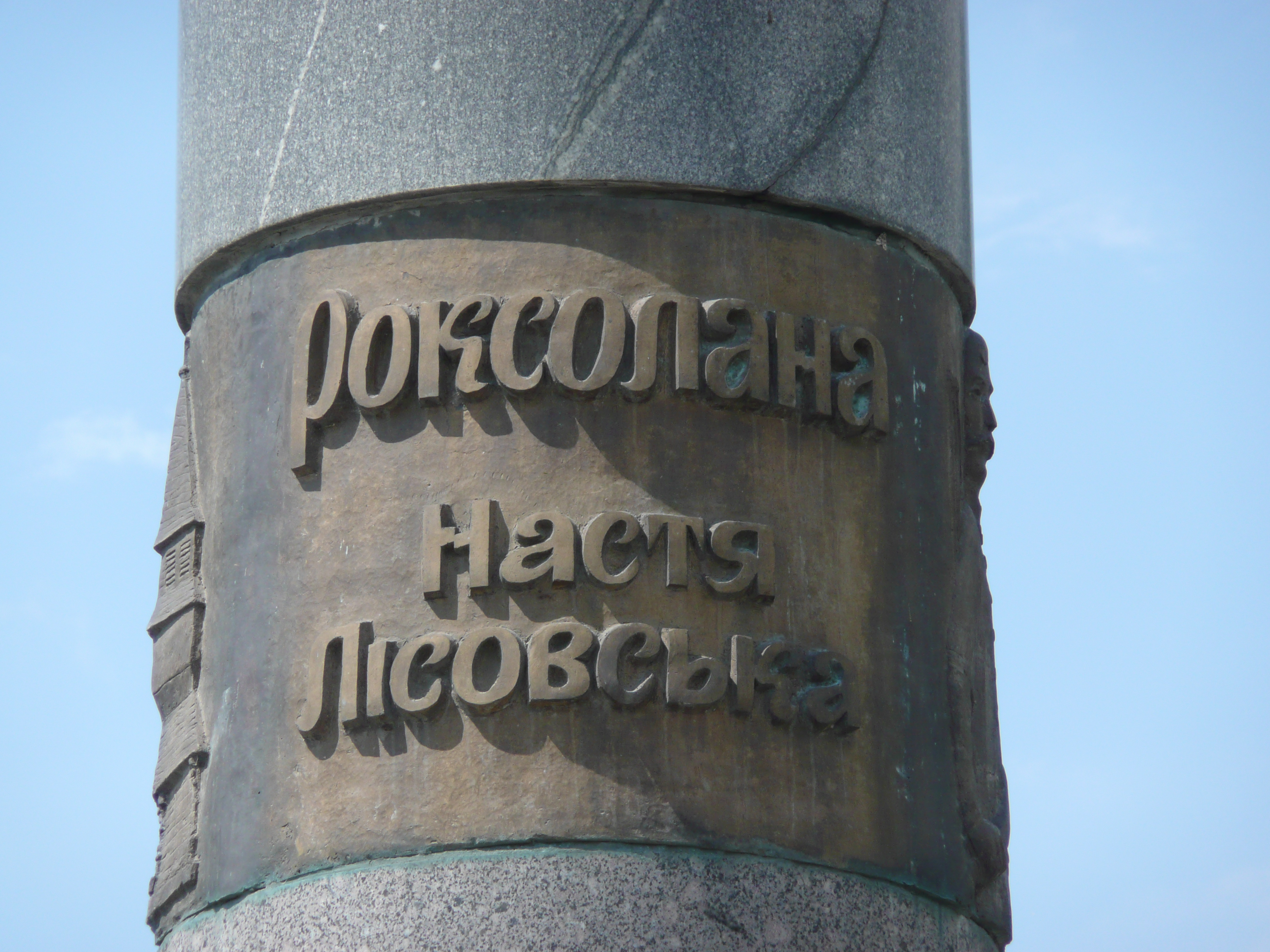
Roksolana, Nastia Lisovska
