= Rohatyn Raion =

Former subdivision of Ivano-Frankivsk Oblast, Ukraine

Rohatyn Raion Рогатинський район
- Raion
- Rohatynskyi raion
- Flag Coat of arms

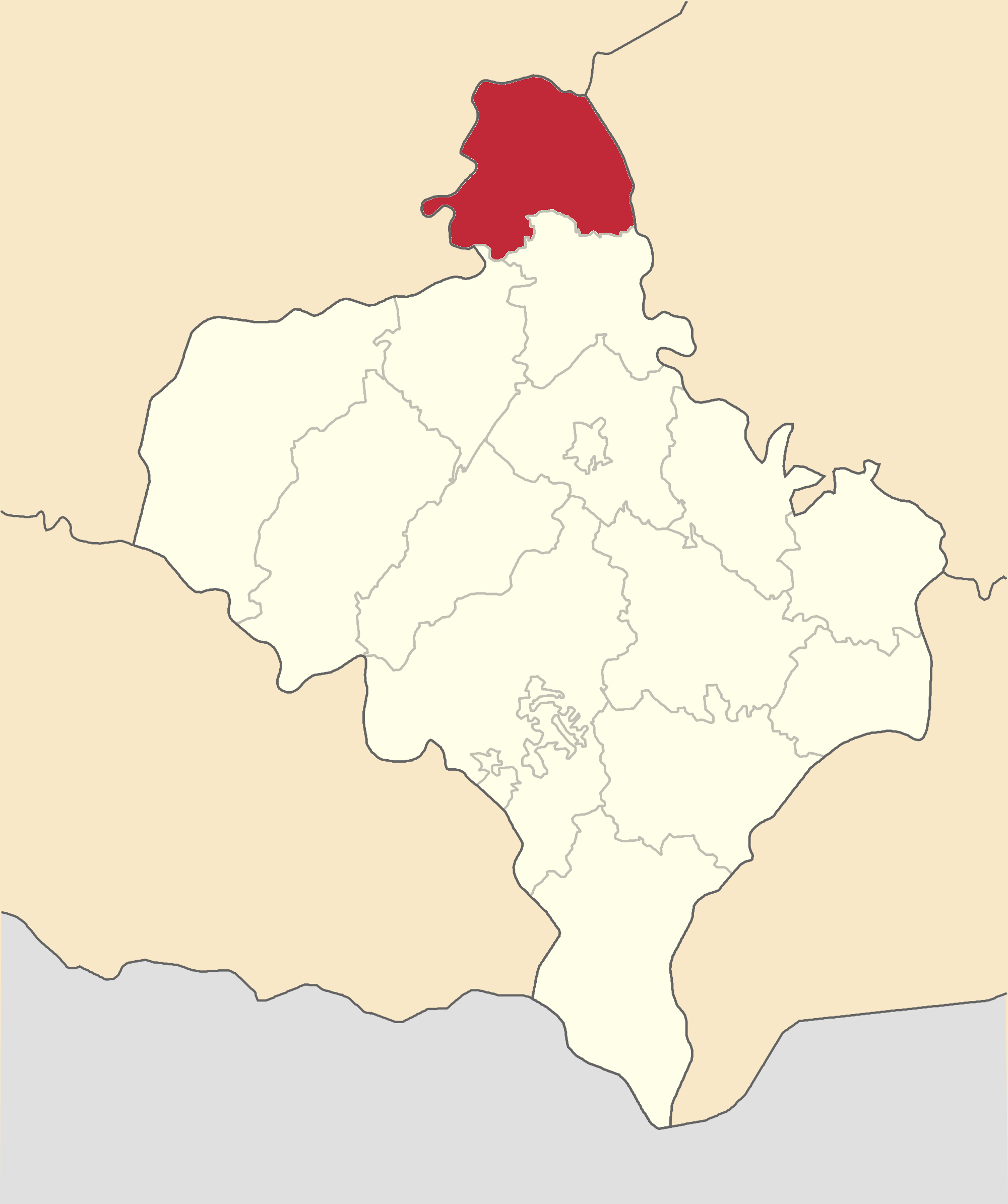
- Coordinates: 49°22′48″N 24°38′18″E
- Country: Ukraine
- Region: Ivano-Frankivsk Oblast
- Disestablished: 18 July 2020
- Admin. center: Rohatyn
- Subdivisions: List: — city councils; — settlement councils; — rural councils; Number of localities: — cities; — urban-type settlements; — villages; — rural settlements

Population (2020)
  - Total: 38,653
- Time zone: UTC+02:00 (EET)
  - Summer (DST): UTC+03:00 (EEST)
- Area code: +380

Rohatyn Raion (Ukrainian: Рогатинський райо́н, romanized: Rohatyns'kyj rajon) was a raion (district) of Ivano-Frankivsk Oblast (region). The town of Rohatyn was the administrative center of the raion. The raion was abolished on 18 July 2020 as part of the administrative reform of Ukraine, which reduced the number of raions of Ivano-Frankivsk Oblast Oblast to six. The area of Rohatyn Raion was merged into Ivano-Frankivsk Raion. The last estimate of the raion population was 38,653 (2020 est.).

== Subdivisions ==
At the time of disestablishment, the raion consisted of two hromadas:

- Bukachivtsi settlement hromada with the administration in the urban-type settlement of Bukachivtsi;
- Rohatyn urban hromada with the administration in Rohatyn.

Some of the villages in Rohatyn Raion were:

- Pukiv
- Lopushnia
- Verkhnia Lypytsia
- Korchunok
- Chesnyky
- Cherche
- Stratyn
- Klishchivna
- Pomoniata
