= Albert Shchukin =

Russian footballer and coach

Personal information
- Full name: Albert Viktorovich Shchukin
- Date of birth: 11 April 1971 (age 55)
- Height: 1.86 m (6 ft 1 in)
- Position: Goalkeeper

Youth career
- FC Dynamo Moscow

Senior career*
Years	Team	Apps	(Gls)
1989–1991	FC Dynamo Vologda	16	(0)
1992–1994	FC Lokomotiv Nizhny Novgorod	2	(0)
1993	→ Raeda Al Adam Tripoli (loan)		
1995	FC Chkalovets Novosibirsk	1	(0)
1995–1997	FC Chernomorets Novorossiysk	9	(0)
1996	→ FC Chernomorets-d Novorossiysk (loan)	3	(0)
1997	FC Chkalovets Novosibirsk	0	(0)
1998–1999	FC Spartak Shchyolkovo	57	(0)
2002	FC Mosenergo Moscow	12	(0)

Managerial career
- 2004: FC Vidnoye (assistant)
- * Club domestic league appearances and goals

Albert Viktorovich Shchukin (Russian: Альберт Викторович Щукин; born 11 April 1971) is a Russian football coach and a former player.
