= Rohatyn urban hromada =

Hromada in Ivano-Frankivsk Oblast, Ukraine

Rohatyn urban hromada Рогатинська міська громада
- hromada
- Seal

- Location within Ivano-Frankivsk Oblast Location within Ukraine
- Coordinates: 49°25′00″N 24°37′00″E
- Country: Ukraine
- Oblast: Ivano-Frankivsk Oblast
- Raion: Ivano-Frankivsk Raion
- Administrative center: Rohatyn

Area
  - Total: 6,526 km^{2} (2,520 sq mi)

Population (2020)
  - Total: 31,500
- Sity: 1
- Villages: 64
- Website: rmtg.gov.ua

Rohatyn urban hromada (Ukrainian: Рогатинська міська громада) is a hromada in Ukraine, in Ivano-Frankivsk Raion of Ivano-Frankivsk Oblast. The administrative center is the city of Rohatyn.

== Settlements ==
The hromada consists of 1 city (Rohatyn) and 64 villages:

- Babukhiv
- Verbylivtsi
- Zaluzhzhia
- Verkhnia Lypytsia
- Honorativka
- Horodyska
- Zeleniv
- Lopushnia
- Malynivka
- Vyspa
- Vasiuchyn
- Liubsha
- Melna
- Kamianka
- Voskresyntsi
- Hryhoriv
- Danylche
- Dehova
- Pryozerne
- Dychky
- Yahlush
- Dobryniv
- Korchunok
- Dolyniany
- Zhovchiv
- Zhuriv
- Zalaniv
- Malyi Zalaniv
- Klishchivna
- Kniahynychi
- Zahiria
- Koniushky
- Berezivka
- Lypivka
- Voroniv
- Kryvnia
- Luchyntsi
- Obelnytsia
- Nyzhnia Lypytsia
- Pomoniata
- Potik
- Zalypia
- Pukiv
- Putiatyntsi
- Pidvynnia
- Kuttsi
- Perenivka
- Pidhoroddia
- Pidmykhailivtsi
- Lukovyshche
- Ruda
- Pidkamin
- Svitanok
- Boiky
- Stratyn
- Pohrebivka
- Uizd
- Fraha
- Benkivtsi
- Pidbiria
- Cherche
- Chesnyky
- Yavche
- Yosypivka
