= Shchukin =

Shchukin or Schukin is a male Russian surname. Its feminine counterpart is Shchukina or Schukina. It may refer to

- Albert Shchukin (born 1971), Russian association football coach and player
- Aleksandr Vladimirovich Shchukin (1946–1988), Soviet test pilot and cosmonaut
- Aleksandr Yuryevich Shchukin (1969–2000), Russian professional footballer
- Anatoly Shchukin (1916–1983), Soviet stage and voice actor
- Boris Shchukin (1894–1939), Soviet actor
- Lev Shchukin (1923–2009), Soviet fighter pilot
- Sergei Lednev-Schukin, Russian landscape and impressionist painter
- Sergei Shchukin (1854–1936), Russian businessman and art collector
- Stepan Shchukin (1754–1828), Russian portrait and watercolor painter
- Vladimir Shchukin (born 1952), Soviet Olympic gymnast
- Yuri Schukin (born 1979), Russian-born Kazakhstani tennis player
- Anna Shchukina (born 1987), Russian Olympic ice hockey player
- Daria Shchukina, Russian wheelchair curler
- Olga Shchukina (born 1977), Olympic shot putter from Uzbekistan
