= Chesnyky =

Rural locality in Ivano-Frankivsk Oblast, Ukraine

Chesnyky Чесники
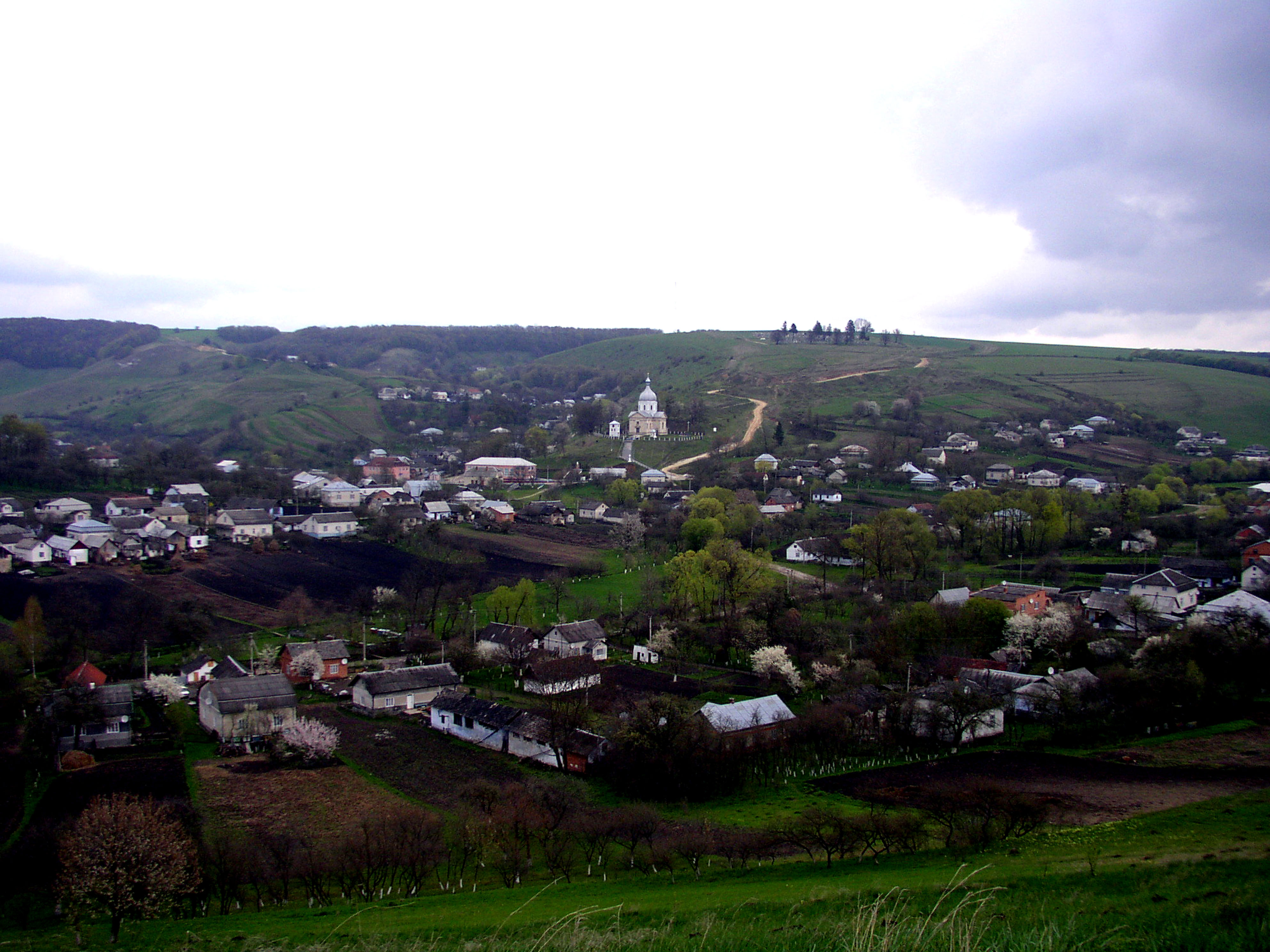
- View of the village of Chesnyky from the Berezhany–Rohatyn road

- Location in Ivano-Frankivsk Oblast Chesnyky (Ukraine)
- Coordinates: 49°23′32″N 24°43′33″E
- Country: Ukraine
- Oblast: Ivano-Frankivsk Oblast
- Raion: Ivano-Frankivsk Raion
- Hromada: Rohatyn urban hromada
- Time zone: UTC+2 (EET)
  - Summer (DST): UTC+3 (EEST)
- Postal code: 77042

Chesnyky (Ukrainian: Чесники) is a village in the Rohatyn urban hromada of the Ivano-Frankivsk Raion of Ivano-Frankivsk Oblast in Ukraine.

== History ==
The first written mention of the village was in 1368.

It is mentioned on 5 May 1449 in the books of the Galician court.

On 19 July 2020, as a result of the administrative-territorial reform and liquidation of the Rohatyn Raion, the village became part of the Ivano-Frankivsk Raion.

== Religion ==
- Saint Nicholas church (14th–15th centuries)

== Bibliography ==
- "Cześniki". Geographical Dictionary of the Kingdom of Poland (in Polish). 1. Warszawa: Kasa im. Józefa Mianowskiego. 1880. p. 851.
