= Cherche =

Village in Ivano-Frankivsk Oblast, Ukraine

Cherche Черче
- Village
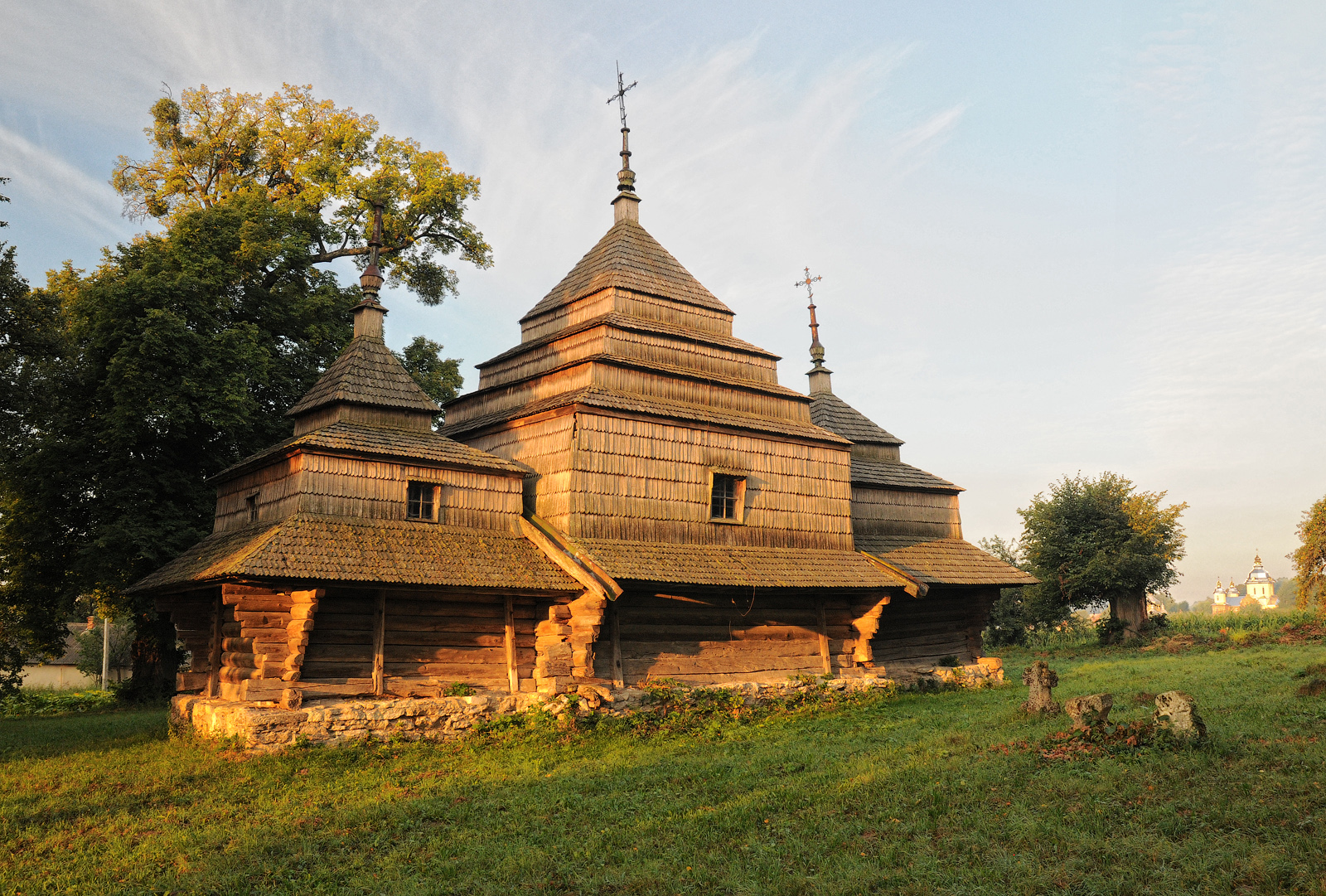
- The wooden Church of Saint Basil in Cherche
- Interactive map of Cherche
- Coordinates: 49°25′N 24°33′E
- Country: Ukraine
- Oblast: Ivano-Frankivsk
- Raion: Ivano-Frankivsk Raion
- Founded: 1443

Government
  - Mayor: Roman Mykhailovych Ivanyshyn

Population (2021)
  - Total: 860

Cherche (Ukrainian: Черче) is a village situated in Ivano-Frankivsk Raion of Ivano-Frankivsk Oblast in western Ukraine. It belongs to Rohatyn urban hromada, one of the hromadas of Ukraine. In 1970 it had a population of 1,400 inhabitants.

The city contains balneological and mud resorts.

== History ==
Cherche is a village located 5 kilometers (approximately 3 miles) from the regional center of Rohatyn. It has a population of approximately 1,500 people. The village is surrounded by hills and sits above the river Potik.

The first written notation regarding Cherche dates back to 1443. However, people have lived in the area since the 13th century.

There are notes about priest (and hence church) and 2 fields circa 50 hectares in tax register of year 1515.

The name of the village is derived from a piece of land on which the first monks settled and later built their first monastery. At the beginning, the village was called Cherneche; it was later changed to Chernche, and finally it became Cherche, which is still in use today.

Until 18 July 2020, Cherche belonged to Rohatyn Raion. The raion was abolished in July 2020 as part of the administrative reform of Ukraine, which reduced the number of raions of Ivano-Frankivsk Oblast to six. The area of Rohatyn Raion was merged into Ivano-Frankivsk Raion.
