= Pukiv =

Rural locality in Ivano-Frankivsk Oblast, Ukraine

Pukiv Пуків
- Village
- Location within Ukraine Location within Ivano-Frankivsk Oblast
- Coordinates: 49°24′0″N 24°31′35″E
- Country: Ukraine
- Oblast: Ivano-Frankivsk Oblast
- Raion: Ivano-Frankivsk Raion
- Established: 1419

Area
  - Total: 24.214 km^{2} (9.349 sq mi)

Population
  - Total: 1,052
  - Density: 43.45/km^{2} (112.5/sq mi)
- Time zone: UTC+2 (EET)
  - Summer (DST): UTC+3 (EEST)
- Postal code: 77041
- Area code: +380 03435

Pukiv (Ukrainian: Пуків) is a village in Ivano-Frankivsk Raion, of Ivano-Frankivsk Oblast (province), Ukraine. It belongs to Rohatyn urban hromada, one of the hromadas of Ukraine.

Until 18 July 2020, Pukiv belonged to Rohatyn Raion. The raion was abolished in July 2020 as part of the administrative reform of Ukraine, which reduced the number of raions of Ivano-Frankivsk Oblast to six. The area of Rohatyn Raion was merged into Ivano-Frankivsk Raion.

Famous people associated with the region:

- Fedir Danylak — Ukrainian choreographer
