= Ofer Fabian =

Israeli footballer

Ofer Fabian עופר פביאן
Personal information
- Full name: Ofer Fabian
- Date of birth: May 10, 1962 (age 64)
- Place of birth: Petah Tikva, Israel
- Position: Goalkeeper

Youth career
- Hapoel Petah Tikva

Senior career*
Years	Team	Apps	(Gls)
1981–1993	Maccabi Petah Tikva		
1983–1984	Bnei Yehuda (loan)	20	(0)
1994–1995	Hapoel Petah Tikva	0	(0)

International career
1987–1988	Israel	3	(0)

Managerial career
- 2001–2007: Maccabi Petah Tikva (assistant)
- 2007–2008: Maccabi Petah Tikva
- 2008: Hapoel Nir Ramat HaSharon (assistant)
- 2009–2010: Hapoel Marmorek
- 2010–2011: Maccabi Jaffa
- 2010–2013: Israel U-21 (assistant)
- 2013–2020: Israel U-17
- * Club domestic league appearances and goals

Ofer Fabian (Hebrew: עופר פביאן) is a former Israeli footballer who now works as the assistant manager of the Israel national under-21 football team.

== Honours ==
- Toto Cup Artzit
  - Winner (2): 1990, 1991
