= Mulabbis =

Former Arab village and archaeological site in modern Israel

Tell Mulabbis
- ملبس, אומלבס, מולבס
- Khirbat Mulabbes, Bulbus
- Interactive map of Tell Mulabbis
- Type: Archaeological mound
- Periods: Roman, Byzantine, Early Islamic, Crusader, Mamluk, Late Ottoman
- Location: Petah Tikva, Israel
- Region: Yarkon River basin

Tel Mulabbis (Arabic: ملبس, Hebrew: אומלבס, מולבס) is an archaeological mound in modern Petah Tikva, Israel.

Mulabbis is a key site in the Yarkon River basin, with habitation remains from the Roman, Byzantine, Early Islamic, Crusader, Mamluk and Late Ottoman periods.

== Crusader and Mamluk periods ==
Khirbat Mulabbes was the site of the Crusader village of Bulbus, as noted by 19th century French scholar Joseph Delaville Le Roulx (1855-1911). In 1133 CE, the Count of Jaffa granted the lands of Bulbus to the Hospitaller order, including “the mills of the three bridges” (“des moulins des trios ponts”).

In 1478 CE (AH 883), the Mamluk Sultan of Egypt, Qaitbay, endowed a quarter of Mulabbes' revenues to two newly established institutions: the Madrasa Al-Ashrafiyya in Jerusalem, and a mosque in Gaza.

== Ottoman period ==
"Melebbes" appears on Jacotin's map drawn up during Napoleon's invasion in 1799, and shows up as "el Mulebbis" on Kiepert's map of Palestine, published in 1856.

Following the invasion of the Levant by Ibrahim Pasha of Egypt (1831-1841), the village was repopulated by Egyptian emigrants belonging to the Abu Hamed al-Masri clan as part of a wider wave of migration that settled in Palestine's coastal lowlands.

In 1870, Victor Guérin noted that "Melebbes" was a small village with 140 inhabitants, surrounded by fields of watermelon and tobacco. An Ottoman village list from about the same year listed Mulebbes with 43 houses and a population of 125. It was also noted that the village was located on a hill, "Auf einer Anhöhe", 2.75 hours northeast of Jaffa.

The Palestine Exploration Fund's Survey of Western Palestine visited "Mulebbis" in 1874 and described it as "a similar mud village [as Al-Mirr], with a well." Following the sale of Mulabbes' lands to Jewish entrepreneurs, its residents dispersed in neighboring villages like Jaljulia and Fajja.

In 1878, Jewish entrepreneurs purchased the land of Mulabbes, establishing the first Jewish moshava, Petah Tikvah.

== Bibliography ==
- ‘Azab, Anan (2008-10-05). "Petah Tiqwa". Hadashot Arkheologiyot – Excavations and Surveys in Israel (120). Archived from the original on 2020-07-15.
- Palmer, E.H. (1881). The Survey of Western Palestine: Arabic and English Name Lists Collected During the Survey by Lieutenants Conder and Kitchener, R. E. Transliterated and Explained by E.H. Palmer. Committee of the Palestine Exploration Fund. (p. 216)
- Clermont-Ganneau, C.S. (1895). Études d'archéologie orientale (in French). Paris: E. Bouillon.
- Conder, C.R.; Kitchener, H.H. (1882). The Survey of Western Palestine: Memoirs of the Topography, Orography, Hydrography, and Archaeology. Vol. 2. London: Committee of the Palestine Exploration Fund.
- Dagan, Yehuda; Golan, Dor (2009-08-23). "Petah Tiqwa–Rishon Le-Ziyyon, Survey". Hadashot Arkheologiyot – Excavations and Surveys in Israel (121). Archived from the original on 2020-07-15.
- Dayan, Ayelet (2011-08-03). "Petah Tiqwa, Mahane Yehuda". Hadashot Arkheologiyot – Excavations and Surveys in Israel (123). Archived from the original on 2020-07-17.
- Delaville Le Roulx, J. (1894). Cartulaire général de l'Ordre des Hospitaliers (in Latin). Vol. 1. Paris.
- Gorzalczany, Amir (2005-11-28). "Petah Tiqwa, Mahane Yehuda". Hadashot Arkheologiyot – Excavations and Surveys in Israel (117). Archived from the original on 2020-07-15.
- Guérin, V. (1875). Description Géographique Historique et Archéologique de la Palestine (in French). Vol. 2: Samarie, pt. 2. Paris: L'Imprimerie Nationale.
- Haddad, Elie (2013-08-20). "Petah Tiqwa, Kh. Mulabbis". Hadashot Arkheologiyot – Excavations and Surveys in Israel (125). Archived from the original on 2017-12-01.
- Hartmann, M. (1883). "Die Ortschaftenliste des Liwa Jerusalem in dem türkischen Staatskalender für Syrien auf das Jahr 1288 der Flucht (1871)". Zeitschrift des Deutschen Palästina-Vereins. 6: 102–149.
- Hütteroth, Wolf-Dieter; Abdulfattah, Kamal (1977). Historical Geography of Palestine, Transjordan and Southern Syria in the Late 16th Century. Erlanger Geographische Arbeiten, Sonderband 5. Erlangen, Germany: Vorstand der Fränkischen Geographischen Gesellschaft. ISBN 978-3-920405-41-4. Archived from the original on 2019-10-14.
- Karmon, Yehuda (1960). "An Analysis of Jacotin's Map of Palestine" (PDF). Israel Exploration Journal. 10 (3, 4): 155–173, 244–253. Archived from the original (PDF) on 2019-12-22.
- Masarwa, Durar (2012-08-26). "Petah Tiqwa (Mulabbis)". Hadashot Arkheologiyot – Excavations and Surveys in Israel (124). Archived from the original on 2020-07-17.
- Masarwa, Durar (2011-12-15). "Petah Tiqwa (Mulabbis)". Hadashot Arkheologiyot – Excavations and Surveys in Israel (123). Archived from the original on 2020-07-17.
- Röhricht, R. (1893). (RRH) Regesta regni Hierosolymitani (MXCVII-MCCXCI) (in Latin). Berlin: Libraria Academica Wageriana.
- Socin, A. (1879). "Alphabetisches Verzeichniss von Ortschaften des Paschalik Jerusalem". Zeitschrift des Deutschen Palästina-Vereins. 2: 135–163.
- Toueg, Ron (2013-08-08). "Petah Tiqwa, Mahane Yehuda". Hadashot Arkheologiyot – Excavations and Surveys in Israel (125). Archived from the original on 2020-07-17.
