= Great Synagogue (Petah Tikva) =

Central synagogue in Petah Tikva, Israel

Great Synagogue of Petah Tikva
- Hebrew: בית הכנסת הגדול בפתח תקוה
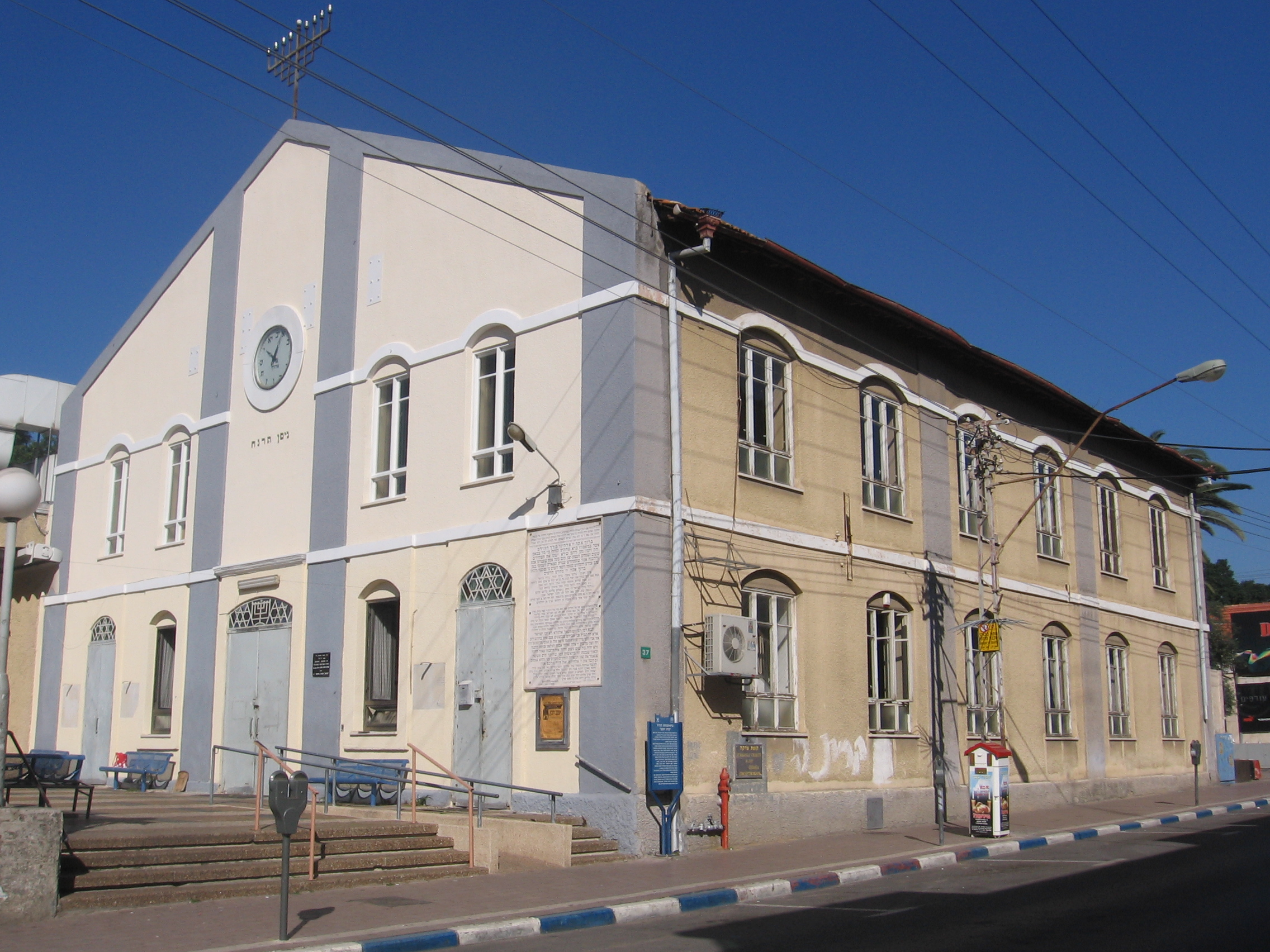
- The synagogue façade, in 2010

- Location of the synagogue in Central Israel

Religion
- Affiliation: Orthodox Judaism
- Rite: Nusach Ashkenaz
- Ecclesiastical or organizational status: Synagogue
- Status: Active

Location
- Location: Petah Tikva, Central District
- Country: Israel
- Interactive map of Great Synagogue of Petah Tikva
- Coordinates: 32°5′20.52″N 34°53′4.6″E

Architecture
- Architect: Daniel HaCohen Lifshitz
- Type: Synagogue architecture
- Funded by: Baron Edmond James de Rothschild
- Groundbreaking: 1885
- Completed: 1900

The Great Synagogue of Petah Tikva (Hebrew: בית הכנסת הגדול בפתח תקוה) is an Orthodox Jewish congregation and synagogue, located on Hovevei Zion Street, in the centre of Petah Tikva, in the Central District of Israel. Completed in 1900, the building was designed by Daniel HaCohen Lifshitz, and is one of the pioneering residents of the city, and was named Beit Yaacov Synagogue, in honour of James Mayer de Rothschild, the father of the Baron Edmond James de Rothschild.

== History ==
Construction of the Great Synagogue of Petah Tikva began in 1885 with a contribution from the Hovevei Zion movement. Edmond James de Rothschild donated the money needed to complete the building, which was named Beit Yaacov in honor of his father.

The building includes a main sanctuary with overlooking women's section, as well as two smaller adjoining prayer rooms, and another room used for studying and praying. In the 1930s, a copper dome was added on the eastern facade. Six medallion images were painted between the arches of the central hall with depictions of Rachel's Tomb, the Western Wall, the Tomb of Absalom, a seven-branched menorah and the burial sites of Zaddikim in Tiberias.

The official nusach of the prayer is Nusach Ashkenaz, but throughout the day, the synagogue facilities act as a shtiebel with multiple parallel prayer sessions where the nusach is decided by the hazzan.

In the late 2000s, the synagogue was the target of vandals who spray-painted swastikas and other Nazi-themed words on the building and inside on multiple events.

Conservation work was then carried out on the synagogue, restoring it in keeping with blueprints from the 1930s.

== Gallery ==
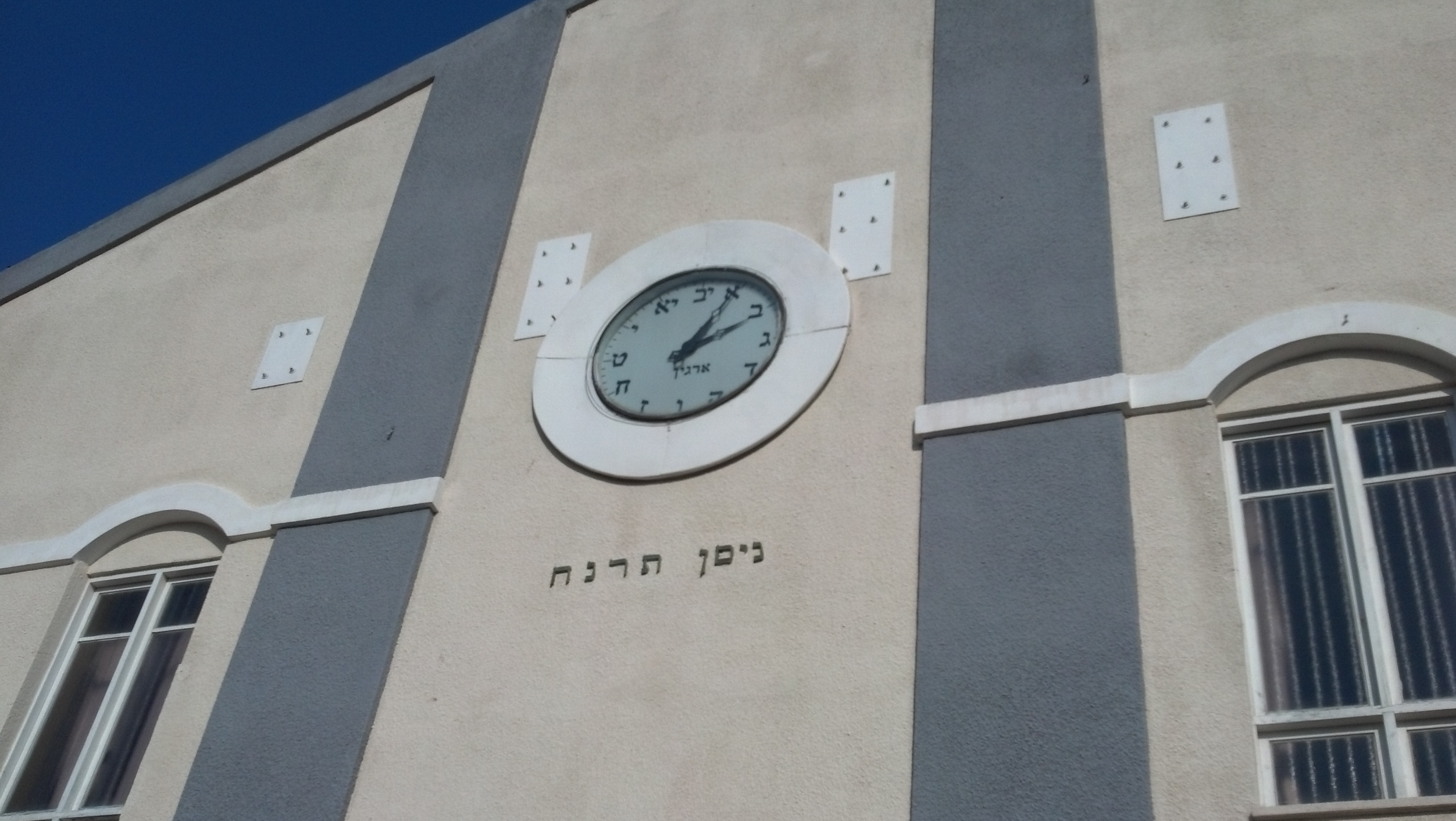
Exterior clock

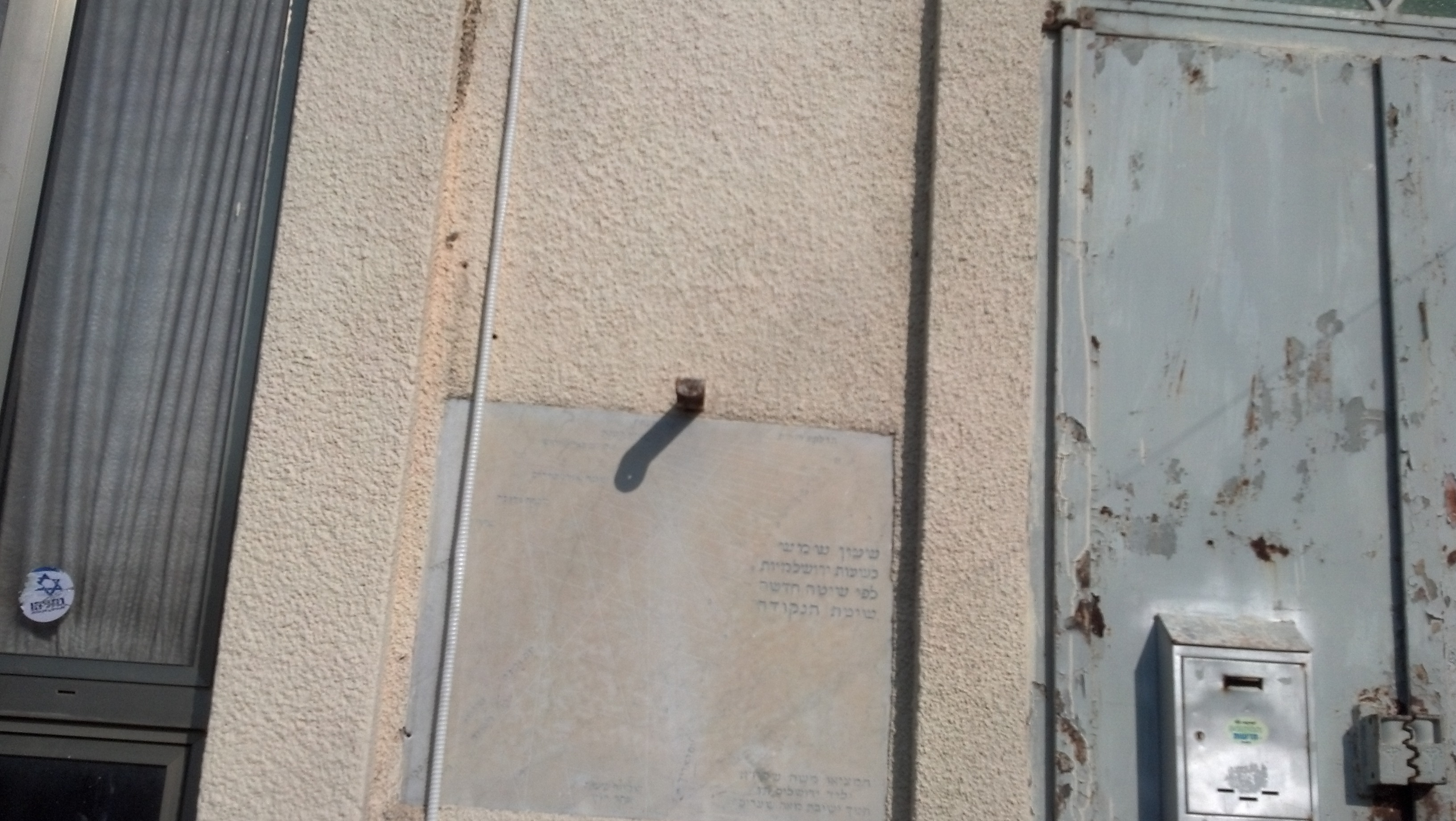
Sundial

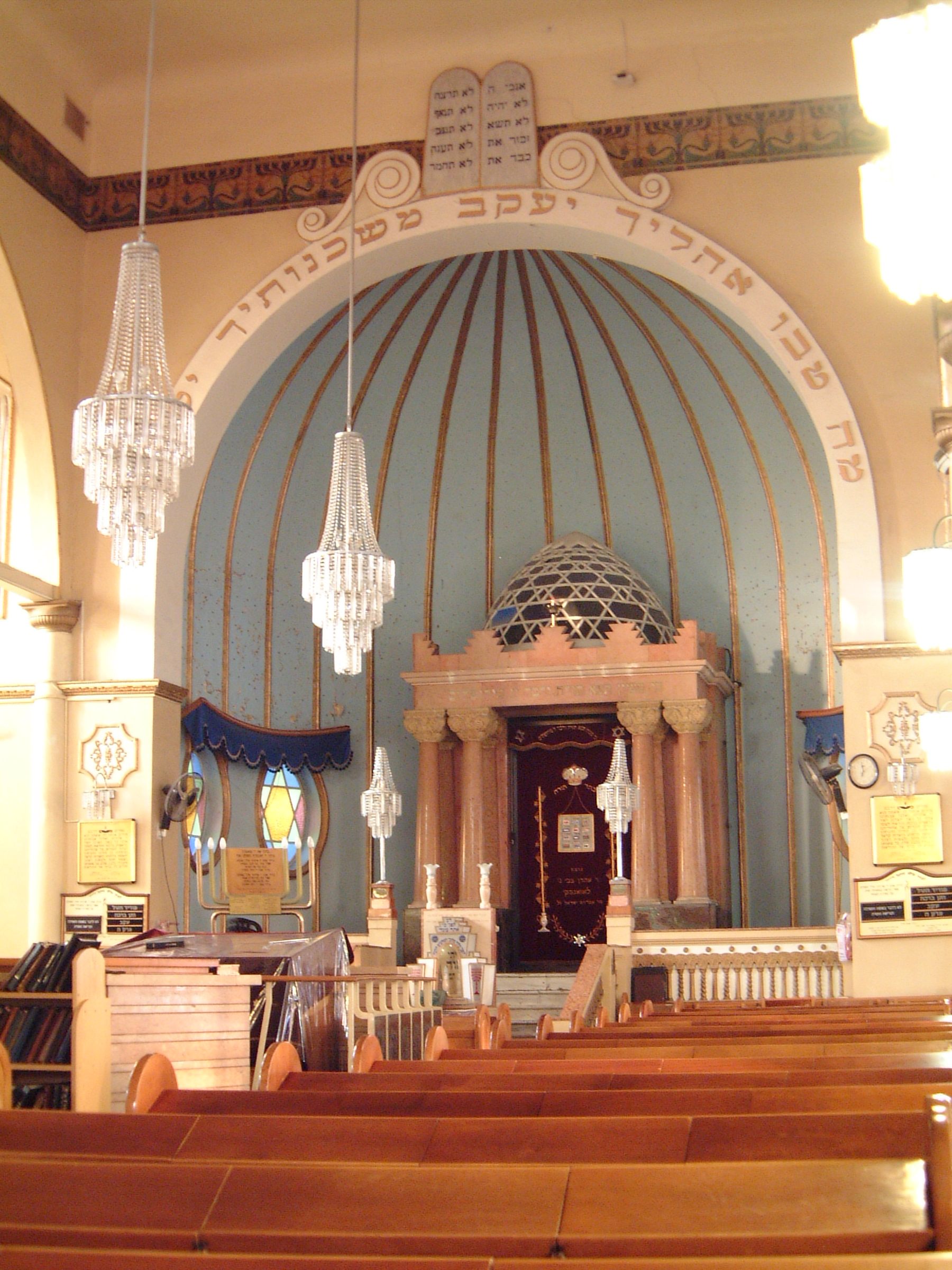
Interior

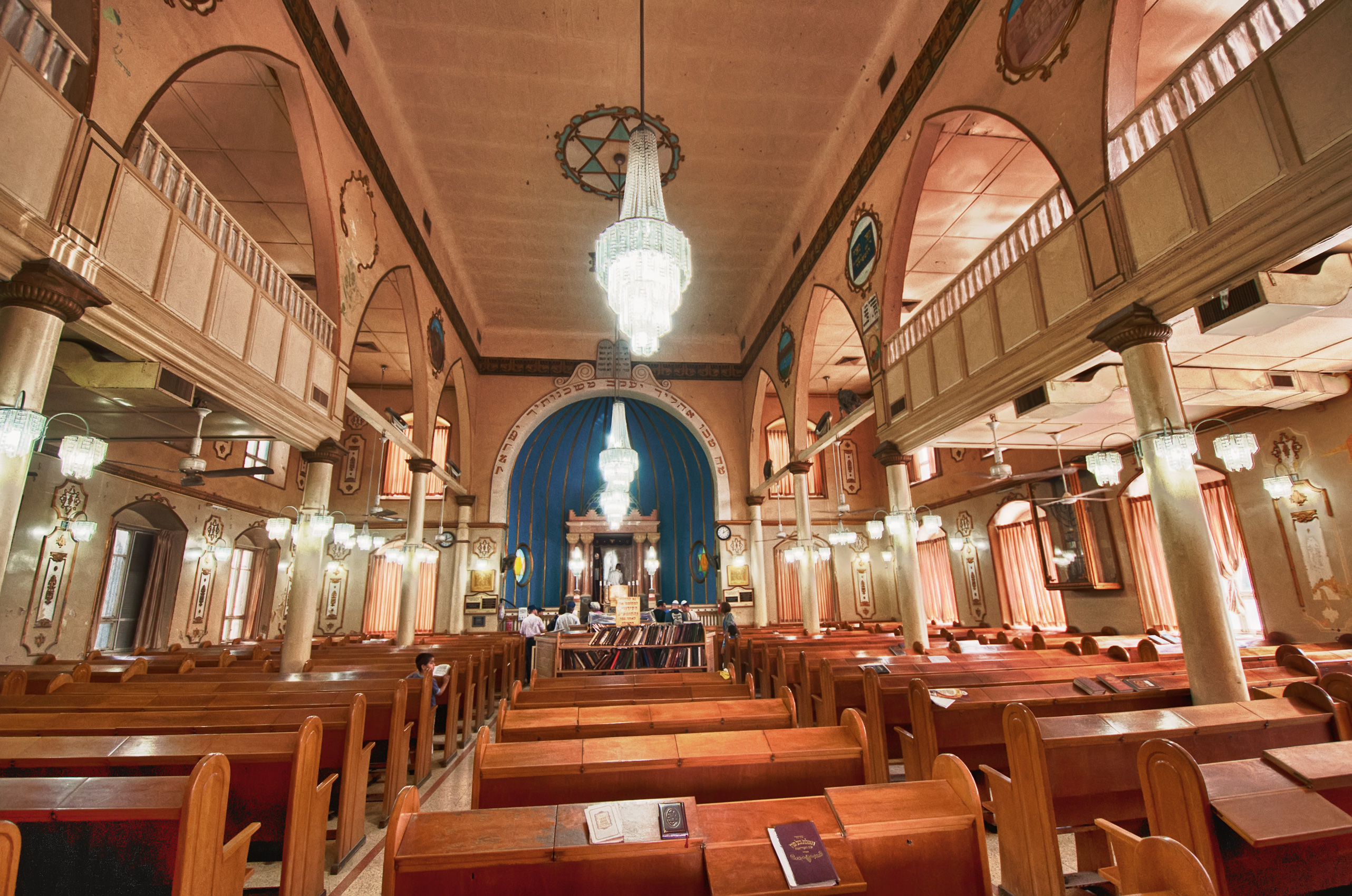
Interior

== See also ==
- Architecture of Israel
- List of synagogues in Israel
- History of the Jews in Israel
