= Petah Tikva =

City in Israel

Coordinates: 32°05′20″N 34°53′11″E

Petah Tikva פתח תקווה (Hebrew)
- City

Hebrew transcription(s)
  - Also spelled: Petah Tiqwa (official); Petach Tikva, Petach Tikvah (unofficial)
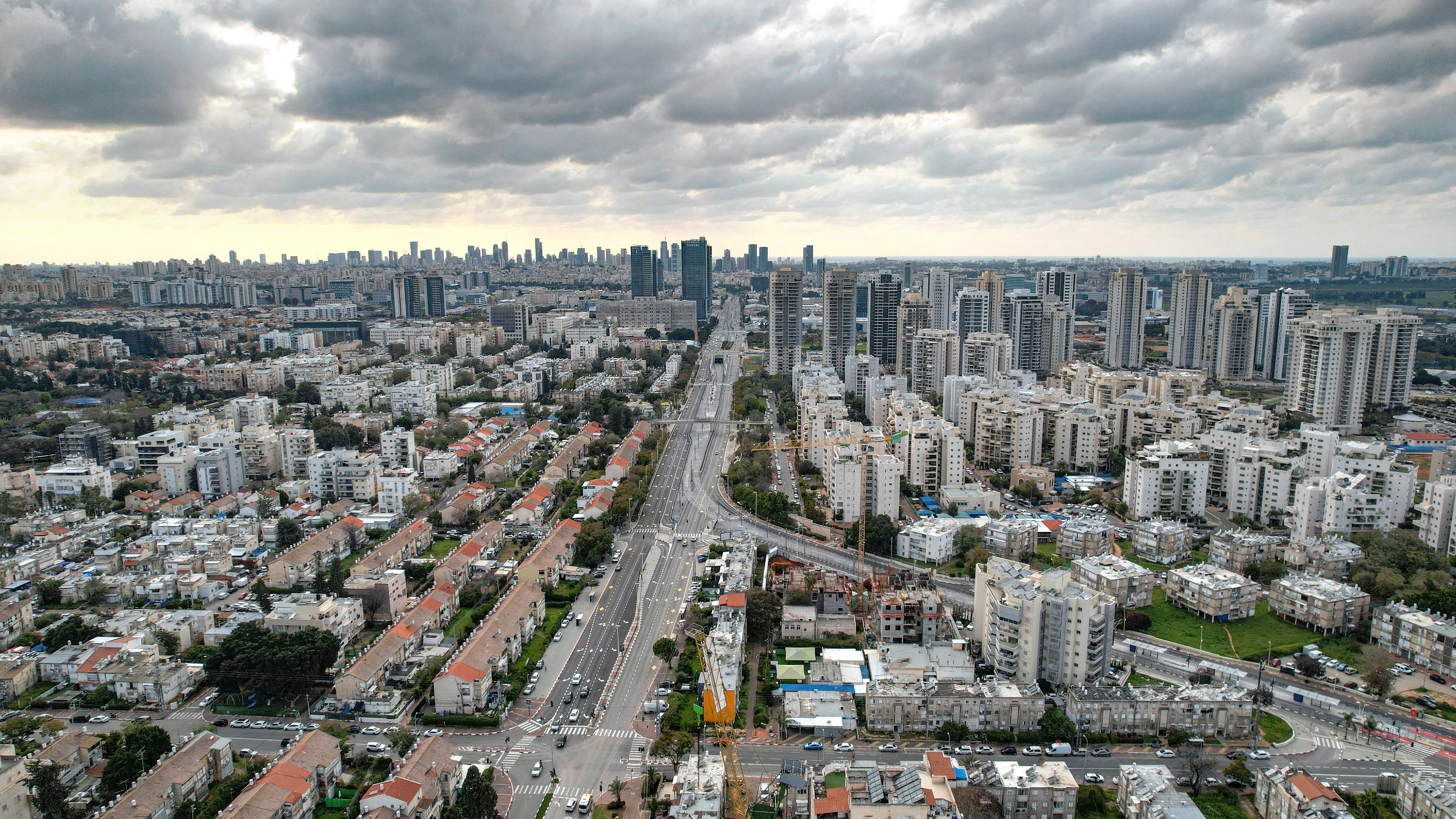
- Jabotinsky Street in Petah Tikva

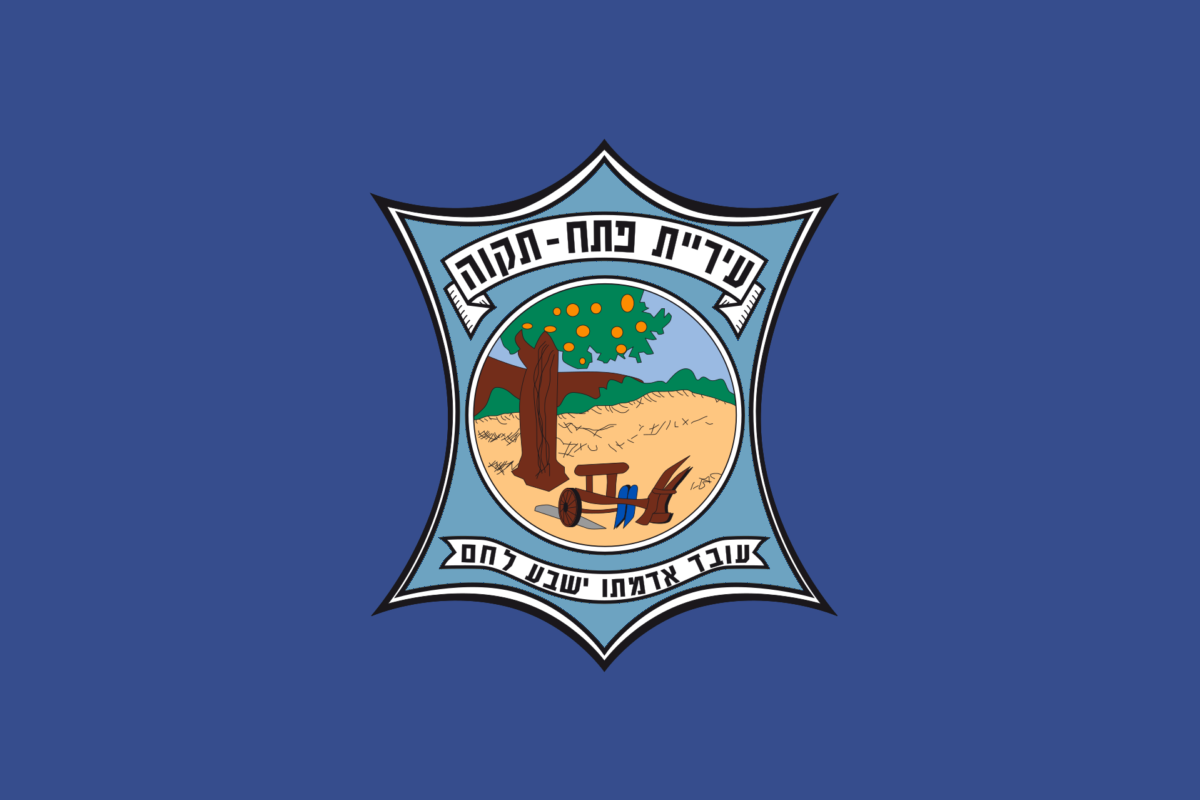
- Flag Coat of arms
- Interactive map of Petah Tikva
- Location within Central Israel Location within Israel
- Grid position: 139/166 PAL
- Country: Israel
- District: Central
- Subdistrict: Petah Tikva
- Natural Region: Petah Tikva
- Founded: 1878; 148 years ago

Government
  - Type: Mayor–council
  - Body: Municipality of Petah Tikva
  - Mayor: Rami Greenberg (Likud)

Area
  - Total: 35,868 dunams (35.868 km^{2}; 13.849 sq mi)

Population (2024)
  - Total: 270,403
  - Density: 7,538.8/km^{2} (19,525/sq mi)

Ethnicity
  - Jews and others: 99.8%
  - Arabs: 0.2%
- Time zone: UTC+2 (IST)
  - Summer (DST): UTC+3 (IDT)
- Name meaning: Door of hope
- Website: petah-tikva.muni.il

Petah Tikva (Hebrew: פתח תקווה, pronounced [ˈpetaχ ˈtikva]), also spelt Petah Tiqwa, is a city in the Central District of Israel, 10.6 km (6.6 mi) east of Tel Aviv. It was founded in 1878, mainly by Haredi Jews of the Old Yishuv, and became a permanent settlement in 1883 with the financial help of Edmond Rothschild.

In 2024, the city had a population of 270,403, thus being the fourth-largest city in Israel. Its population density is approximately 6,277 inhabitants per square kilometre (16,260/sq mi). Its jurisdiction covers 35,868 dunams (~35.9 km^{2} or 15 sq mi). Petah Tikva is part of the Gush Dan metropolitan area.

== Etymology ==
Petah Tikva takes its name (lit. 'Door of hope') from the biblical allusion in Hosea 2:15: "... and make the valley of Achor a door of hope." The Achor Valley, near Jericho, was the original proposed location for the town.

== History ==
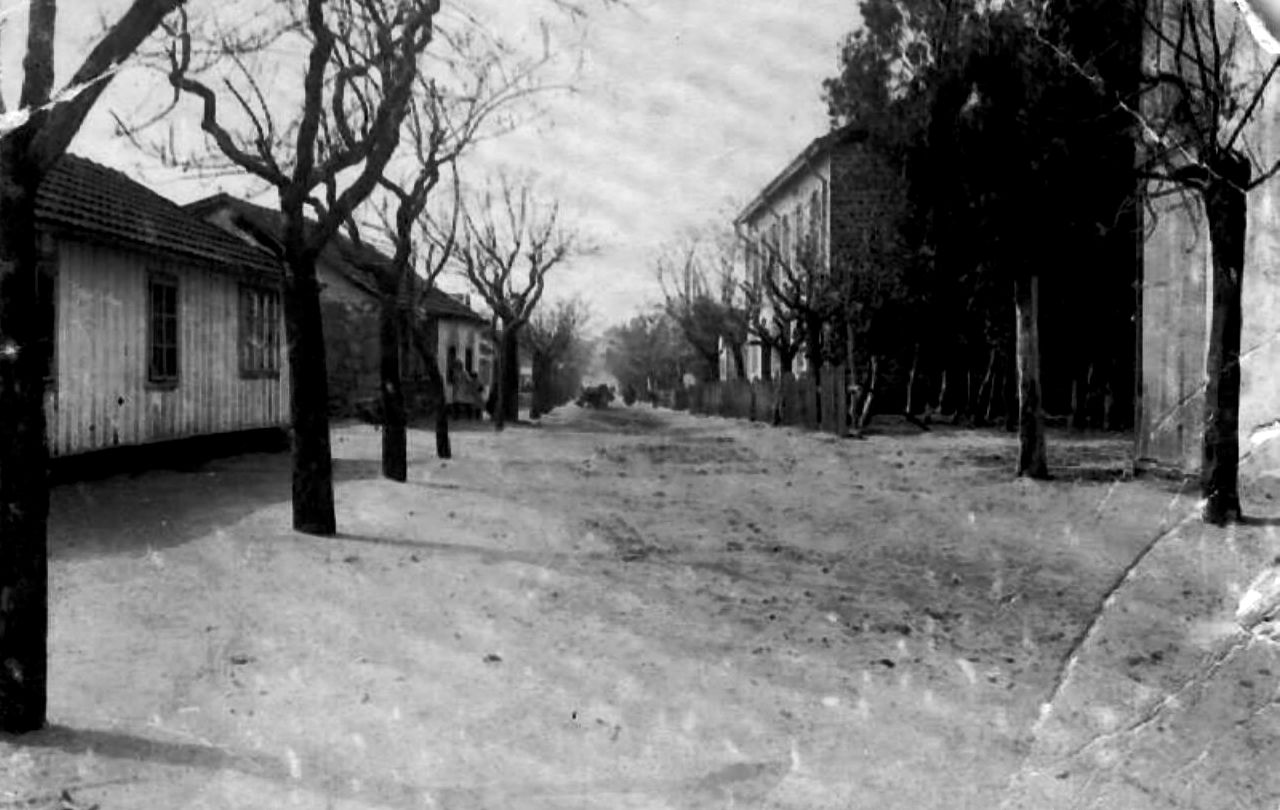
Petah Tikva in 1911

Tel Mulabbis, an archaeological mound in modern Petah Tikva, is an important archaeological site from the Yarkon River basin, with habitation remains from the Roman, Byzantine, Early Islamic, Crusader, Mamluk and Late Ottoman periods. The place was inhabited sporadically, and was the site of an Egyptian Arab village of the same name, inhabited by the Abu Hamed al-Masri clan.

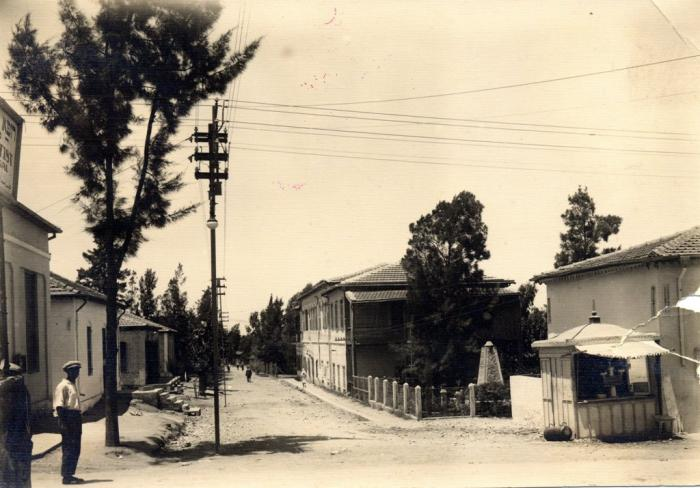
Petah Tikva in the 1920s

Petah Tikva was founded in 1878 by immigrants from Europe, among them Yehoshua Stampfer, Moshe Shmuel Raab, Yoel Moshe Salomon, Zerach Barnett, and David Meir Gutmann, as well as Lithuanian Rabbi Aryeh Leib Frumkin who built the first house. It was the first modern Jewish agricultural settlement in Ottoman Southern Syria (hence its nickname as 'Mother of the Moshavot').

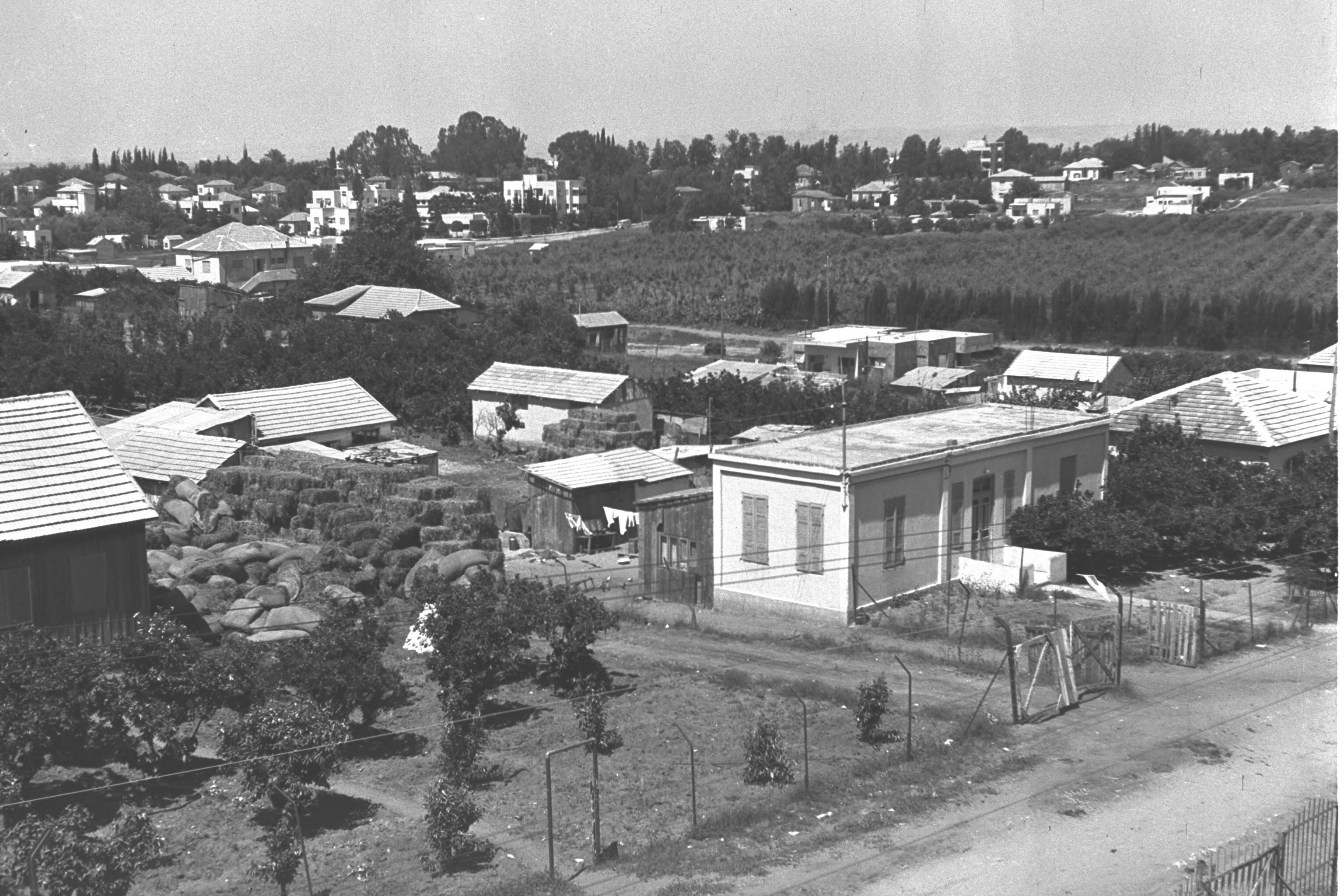
Petah Tikva in 1936

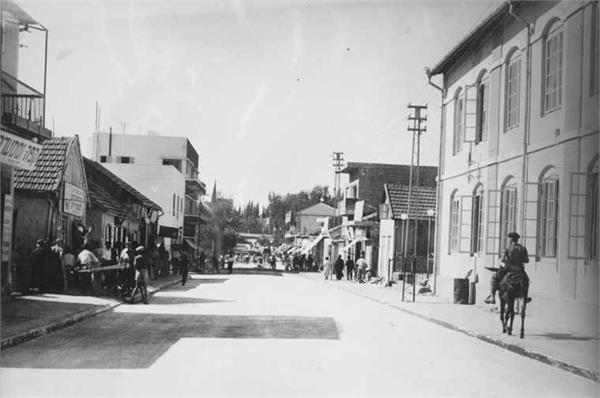
Petah Tikva in 1936

Originally intending to establish a new settlement in the Achor Valley, near Jericho, the settlers purchased land in that area. However, Ottoman Sultan Abdul Hamid II cancelled the purchase and forbade them from settling there, but they retained the name Petah Tikva as a symbol of their aspirations.

In 1878, the founders of Petah Tikva learned of the availability of land northeast of Jaffa near the village of Mulabes (or Umlabes). The land was owned by two Christian businessmen from Jaffa, Antoine Bishara Tayan and Selim Qassar, and was worked by some thirty tenant farmers. Tayan's property was the larger, some 8,500 dunams, but much of it was in the malarial swamp of the Yarkon Valley. Qassar's property, approximately 3,500 dunams, lay a few kilometers to the south of the Yarkon, away from the swampland. It was Qassar's that was purchased on 30 July 1878. Tayan's holdings were purchased when a second group of settlers, known as the Yarkonim, arrived in Petah Tikva the following year. Abdul Hamid II allowed the purchase because of the poor quality of the land.

In a microhistorical anecdote of Petah Tikva, Yehuda Raab, one of the Hungarian settlers, recalls in his memoirs meeting a Baghdadi Jew, Daud abu Yusuf, who despite appearing as a Bedouin, announced "ana Israʾili," (lit. 'I am Jewish'), and recited the shema by way of proof. Yusuf, along with a Moroccan Jew from Jaffa, Yaʿqub bin Maymun Zirmati, was hired as a guard for colony; it was customary for European Jewish colonies to hire local Arab guards or in some cases Yemenite Jews. Both were Ottoman imperial subjects and were important cultural and linguistic go-betweens, for example in the horse and camel trade, from the world of the Ashkenazi Jewish immigrants and that of the Eastern or Maghrebi Jews, today called Mizrahi Jews.

A malaria epidemic broke out in 1880, forcing the abandonment of the settlements on both holdings by 1881 or 1882. Those who remained in the area moved south to Yehud. After Petah Tikva was reoccupied by Chovovei Tzion immigrants in 1883, some of the original families returned. With funding for swamp drainage provided by Baron Edmond de Rothschild, the colony became more stable.

In March 1886, Arab peasants from Yahudiya attacked the Jewish colony, injuring 5, with one dying later, possibly due to aggravation of her preexisting condition. This was called the first violent clash in the Yishuv by Moshe Smilansky.

Upon learning that the Austrian post office in Jaffa wanted to open a branch in Petah Tikva, Yitzchak Goldenhirsch, an early resident, offered his assistance on condition that the Austrian consulate issued a Hebrew stamp and a special postmark for Petah Tikva. The stamp was designed by an unknown artist featuring a plow, green fields and a blossoming orange tree. The price was 14 paras (a Turkish coin) and displayed the name 'Petah Tikva' in Hebrew letters.

David Ben Gurion lived in Petah Tikva for a few months on his arrival in Mutasarrifate of Jerusalem in 1906. It had a population of around 1000, half of them farmers. He found occasional work in the orange groves. But, he soon caught malaria and his doctor recommended he return to Europe. The following year, after moving to Jaffa, he set up a Jewish workers organisation in Petah Tikva.

During the Sinai and Palestine campaign of World War I, Petah Tikva became as a refuge for Jewish residents expelled from Tel Aviv and Jaffa by the Ottoman authorities, and suffered due to its location between the Ottoman and British front liness. During the 1915 Ottoman Syria locust infestation 6,065 of its 7,665 dunams citrus plantations (80%) were destroyed.

=== British Mandate ===
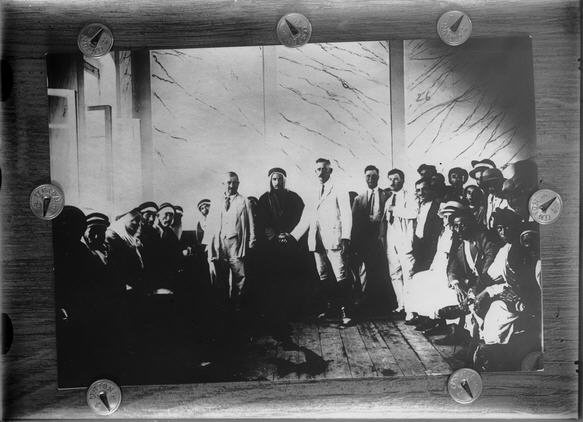
Petah Tikva peace treaty, 1927

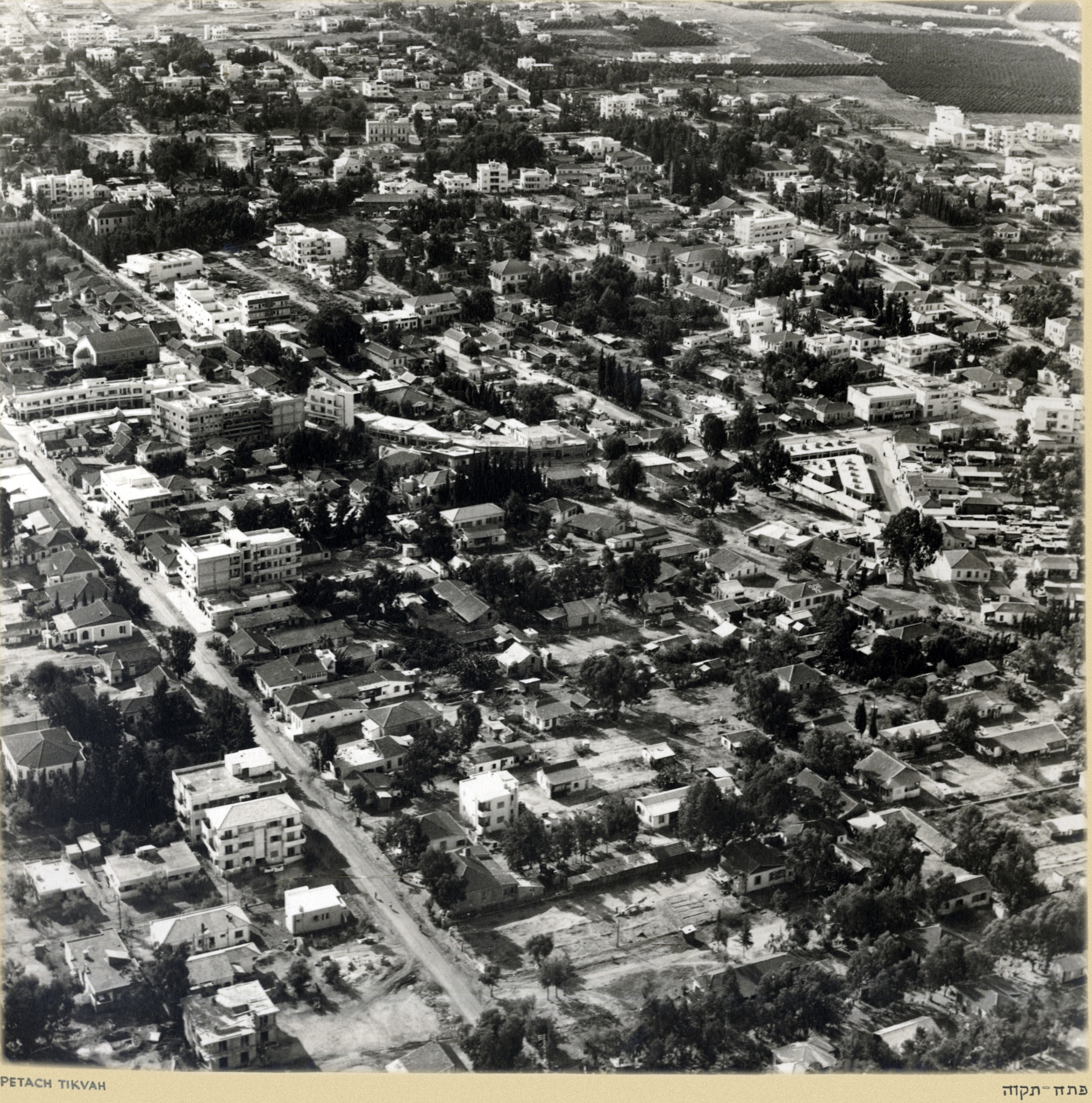
Aerial view of Petah Tikva, late 1930s

In the early 1920s, industry began to develop in the Petah Tikva region. In 1921, Petah Tikva was granted local council status by the British authorities. In May 1921, Petah Tikva was the target of an Arab attack, which left four of its Jewish inhabitants dead–an extension of the 1921 Jaffa riots. In 1927, Petah Tikva concluded a local peace treaty with the Arabs living nearby; subsequently, Petah Tikva was untouched by the 1929 Palestine riots.

According to the 1922 census conducted by the British Mandate authorities, Petah Tikva had a total population of 3,032: 3,008 Jews, 22 Muslims and 2 Orthodox Christians.

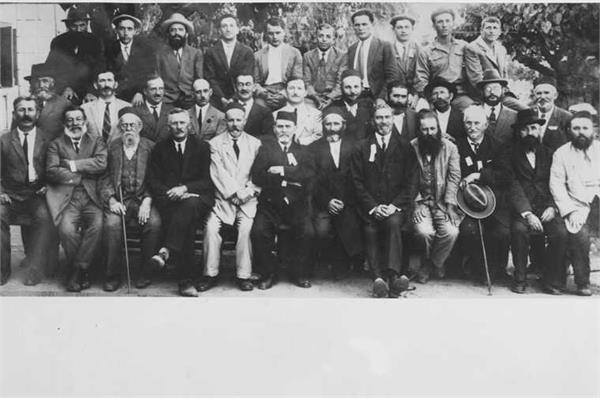
Petah Tikva Council in 1928

By the time the 1931 census was taken, the population had increased to 6,880 inhabitants in 1,688 houses. In 1937, it was recognized as a city. Its first mayor, Shlomo Stampfer, was the son of one of its founders, Yehoshua Stampfer.

Petah Tikva, a center of citrus farming, was considered by both the British government and the Jaffa Electric Company as a potentially important consumer of electricity for irrigation. The Auja Concession, which was granted to the Jaffa Electric Company on 1921, specifically referred to the relatively large Jewish settlement of Petah-Tikva. But, it was only in late 1929 that the company submitted an irrigation scheme for Petah-Tikva, and it was yet to be approved by the government in 1930.

In 1931, Ben Gurion wrote that Petah Tikva had 5000 inhabitants and employed 3000 Arab labourers.

In the 1930s, the pioneering founders of Kvutzat Yavne from the Religious Zionist movement immigrated to the British Mandate, settling near Petah Tikva on land purchased by a Jewish-owned German company. Refining the agricultural skills they learned in Germany, these pioneers began in 1941 to build their kibbutz in its intended location in the south of Israel, operating from Petah Tikva as a base.

=== State of Israel ===
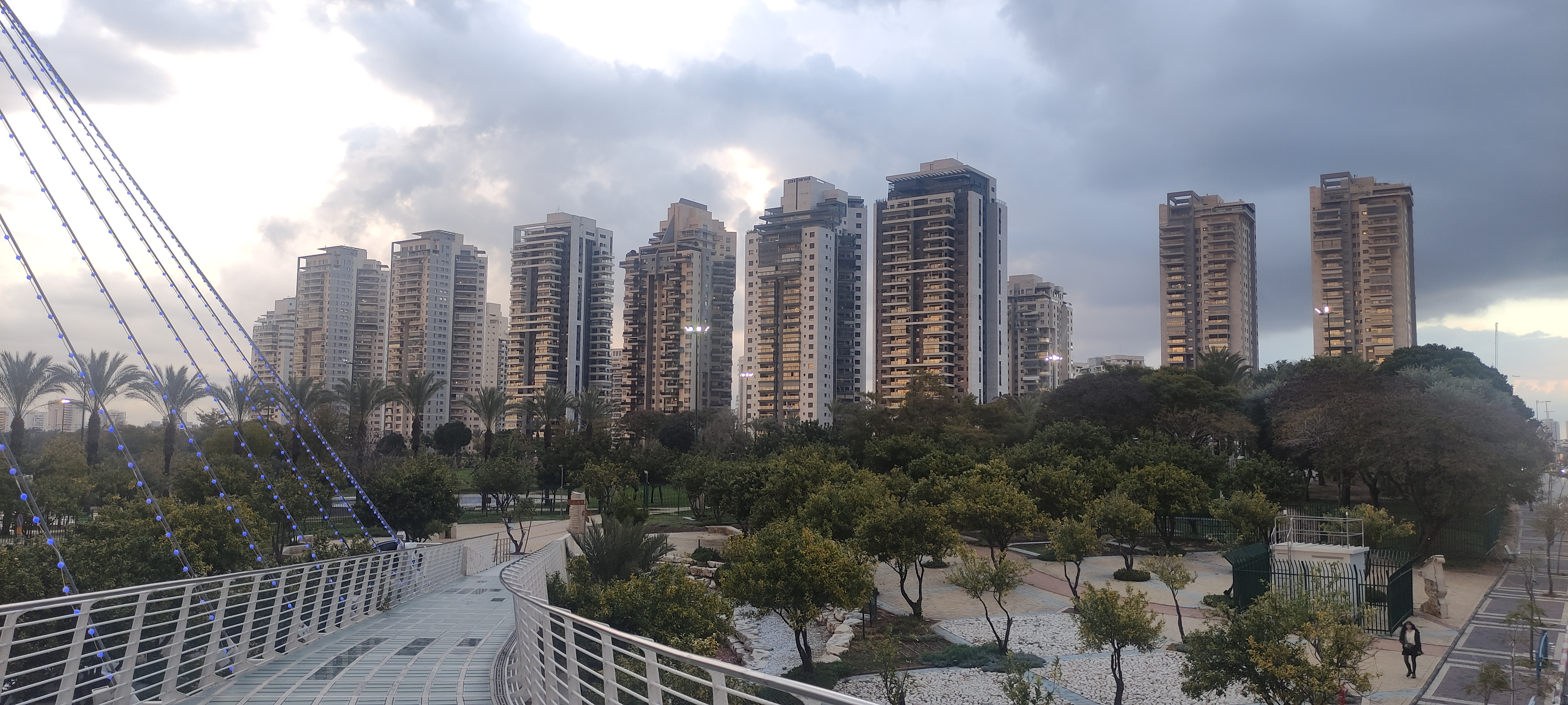
Neve Gan neighborhood

After the 1948 Arab–Israeli War, Petah Tikva annexed all of the lands of the newly depopulated Palestinian Arab village of Fajja. The city has suffered a series of terror attacks as a result of the ongoing regional conflict, including the bombing of a vegetable market in 1977, and three attacks during the Second Intifada: On 27 May 2002, a suicide bomber blew himself up at a small cafe outside a shopping mall, leaving two dead, including a baby; on 25 December 2003, a suicide bomber blew himself up at a bus stop near the Geha bridge, killing 4 civilians, and on 5 February 2006, a Palestinian got into a shuttle taxi, pulled out a knife, and began stabbing passengers killing two of them, but a worker from a nearby factory hit him with a log, subduing him.

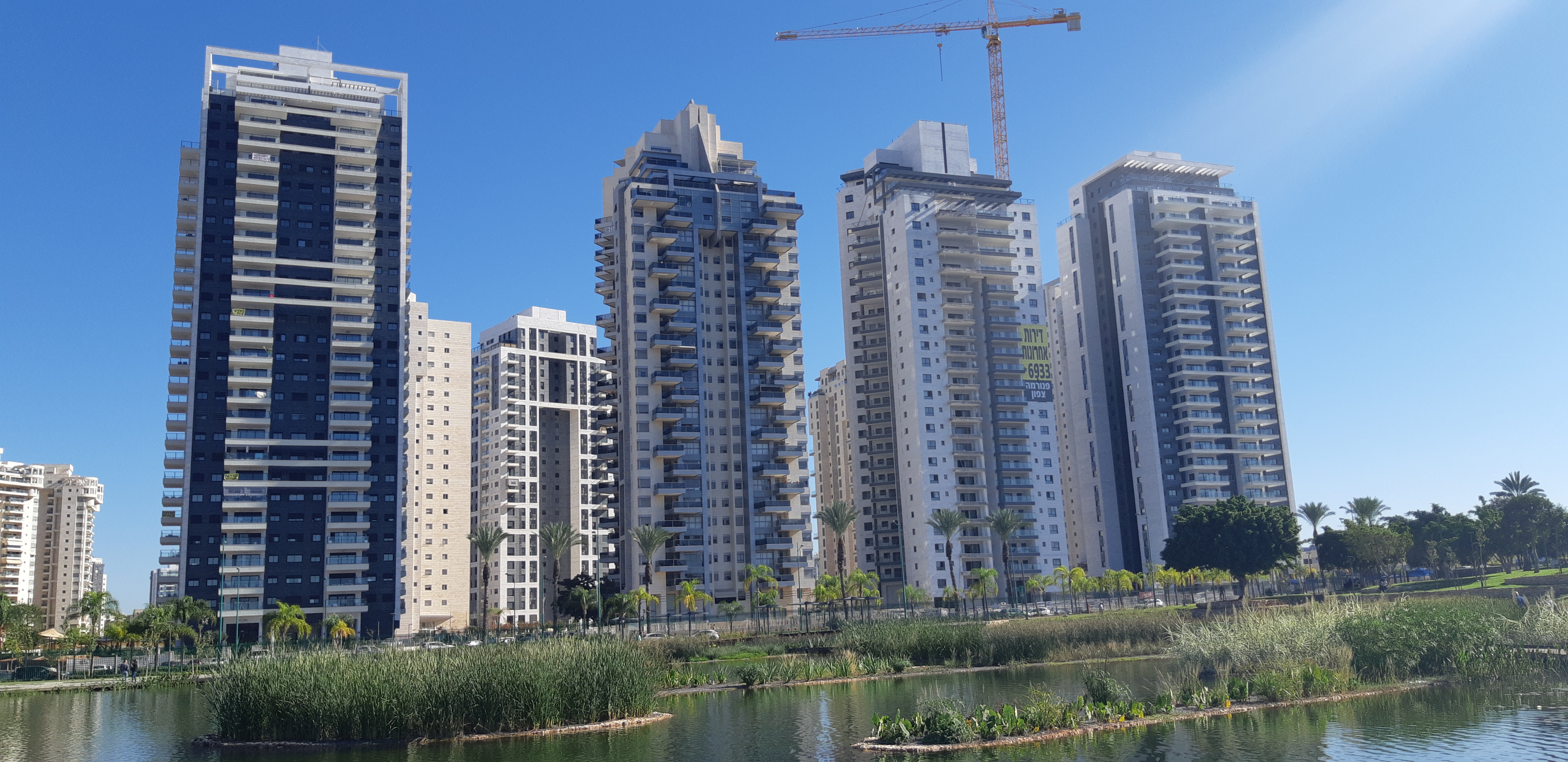
Residential high-rises in Petah Tikva

After the independence of Israel on 14 May 1948, several adjoining villages–Amishav and Ein Ganim to the east (named after the biblical village (Joshua 15:34)), Kiryat Matalon to the west, towards Bnei Brak, Kfar Ganim and Mahaneh Yehuda to the south and Kfar Avraham on the north–were merged into the municipal boundaries of Petah Tikva, boosting its population to 22,000.

As of 2026, with a population of over 240,000 inhabitants, Petah Tikva is the second most populous city in the Gush Dan metropolitan area. Petah Tikva is divided into 33 neighborhoods for municipal purposes.

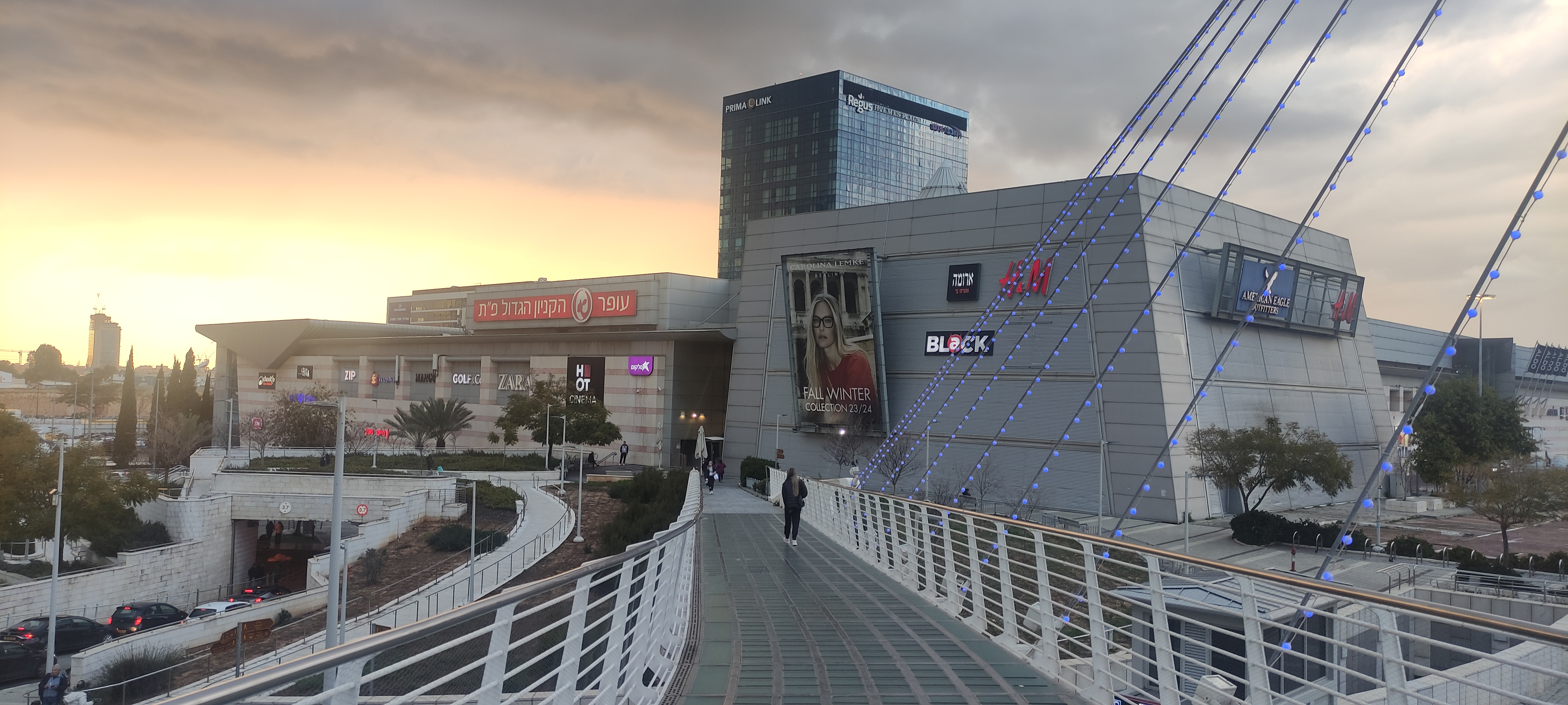
Petah Tikva Grand Mall

On 16 June 2025, an Iranian missile hit a 20-story building, killing four people including Holocaust survivor Ivette Shmilovitz.

== Demographics ==
Year	Population
1972	93,500
1983	124,300
1995	149,600
2008	200,300
2022	264,046
2024	270,403

=== Religion ===
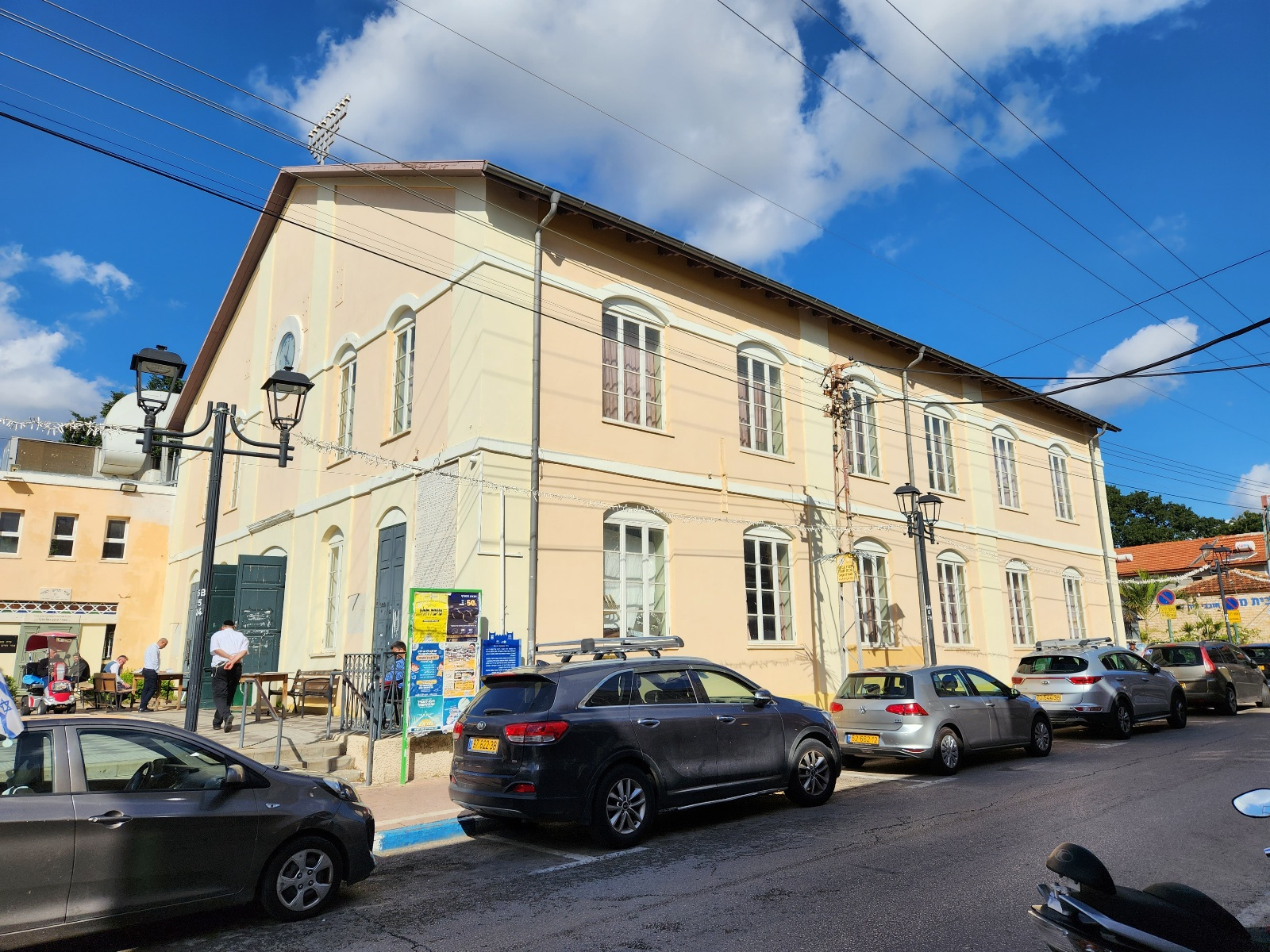
Great Synagogue of Petah Tikva

Some 70,000 Orthodox Jews live in Petah Tikva. The community of Petah Tikva is served by 300 synagogues, including the 120-year-old Great Synagogue, eight mikvaot (ritual baths) and two major Haredi yeshivot, Lomzhe Yeshiva and Or-Yisrael (founded by the Chazon Ish, Rabbi Avraham Yeshayahu Karelitz). Additionally, Rav Michael Laitman, PhD in Philosophy and Kabbalah (see Bnei Baruch), daily leads 200-300 students and hundreds of thousands virtually (some estimates of up to 2 million) in the method of Kabbalah learned from his teacher Rav Baruch Ashlag, known as the Rabash (stylized in all caps).

=== Health ===
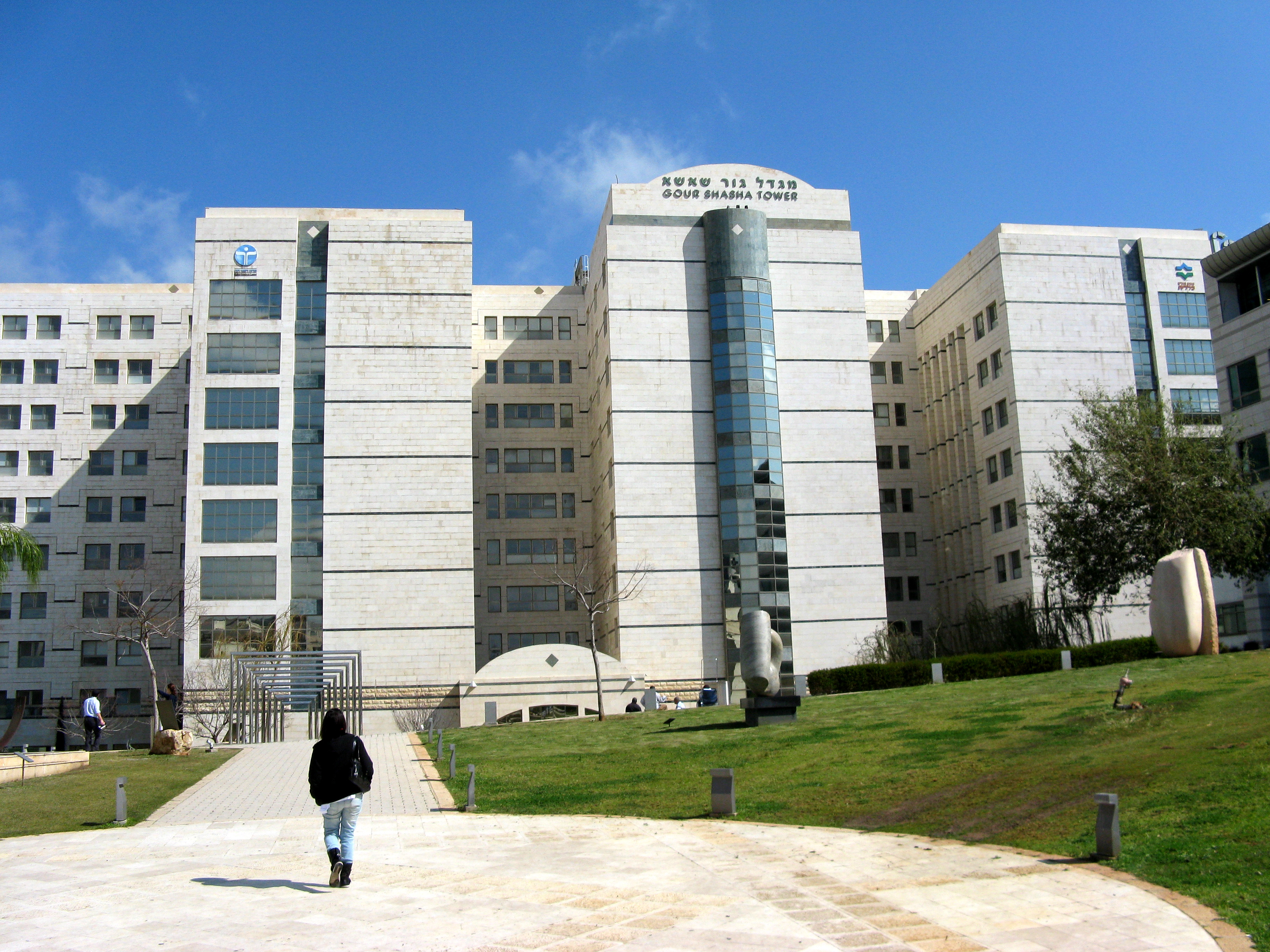
Rabin Medical Center

Six hospitals are located in the city. The Rabin Medical Center complex includes the Beilinson Medical Center, the Davidoff Oncologic Center, the Geha Psychiatric Hospital, the Schneider Pediatric Hospital and Tel Aviv University's Faculty of Medical Research. Other medical facilities in Petah Tikva are HaSharon Hospital, the Beit Rivka Geriatric Center, the Kupat Holim Medical Research Center and a private hospital, Ramat Marpeh, affiliated with Assuta Hospital.

The Schneider Pediatric Center is one of the largest and most modern children's hospitals in the Middle East. In addition, there are many family health clinics in Petah Tikva as well as Kupat Holim clinics operated by Israel's health maintenance organizations. The city is also served by Mayanei Hayeshua Medical Center, a Haredi hospital in nearby Bnei Brak.

=== Education ===
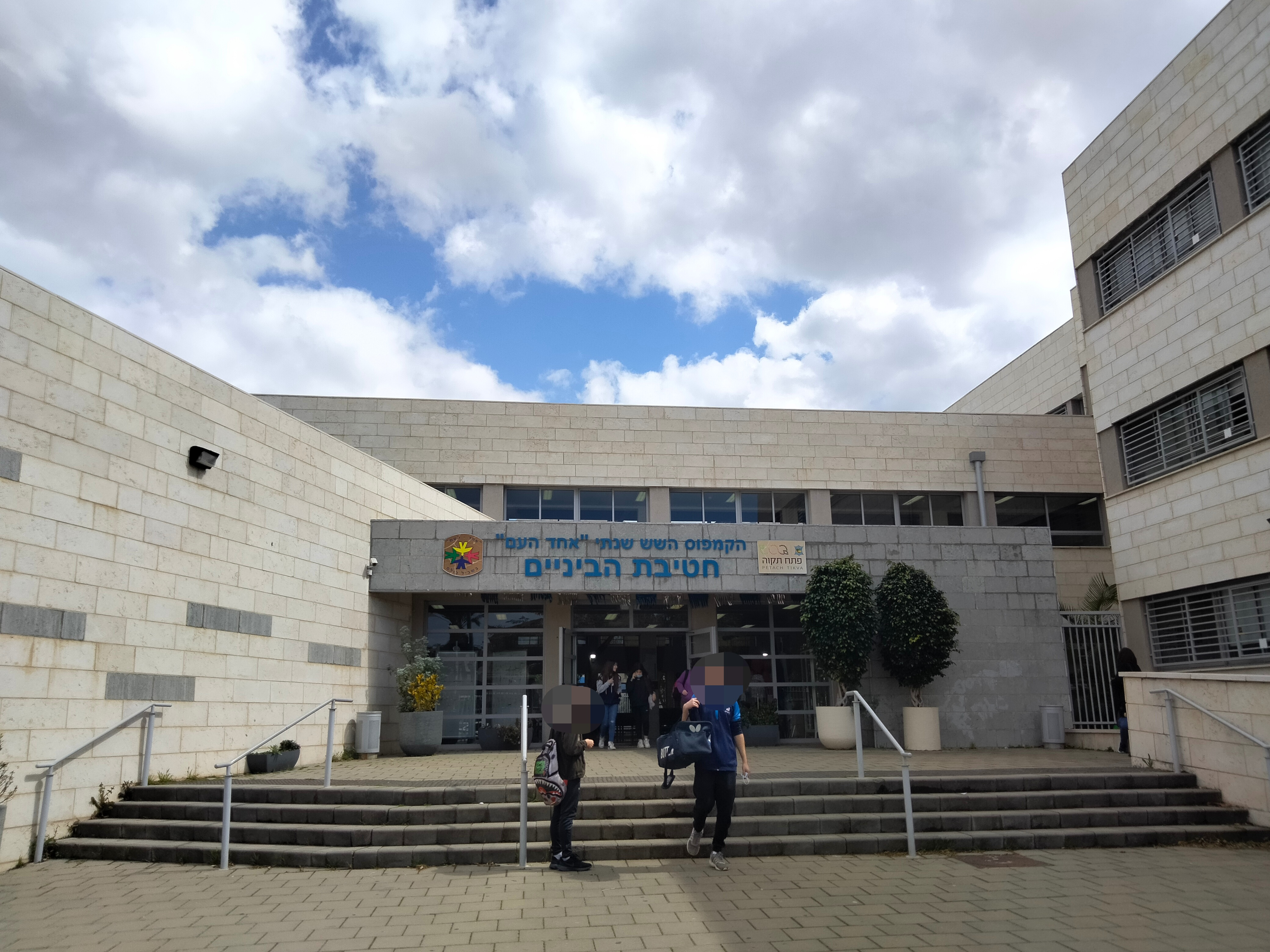
Ahad HaAm High School

Petah Tikva is home to 300 educational institutions from kindergarten through high school, catering to the secular, religious and Haredi populations. There are over 43,000 students enrolled in these schools, which are staffed by some 2,400 teachers. Petah Tikva has seventeen public libraries, the main one located in the city hall building.

The Ahad HaAm High School (named after Asher Zvi Hirsch Ginsberg) is located in Petah Tikva. The high school won the National Education Award for 2010 from the Israeli Ministry of Education in recognition of its excellence in education and outstanding matriculation rate – 95.32%. The high school campus also houses the Open University's Petah Tikva College.

== Government ==
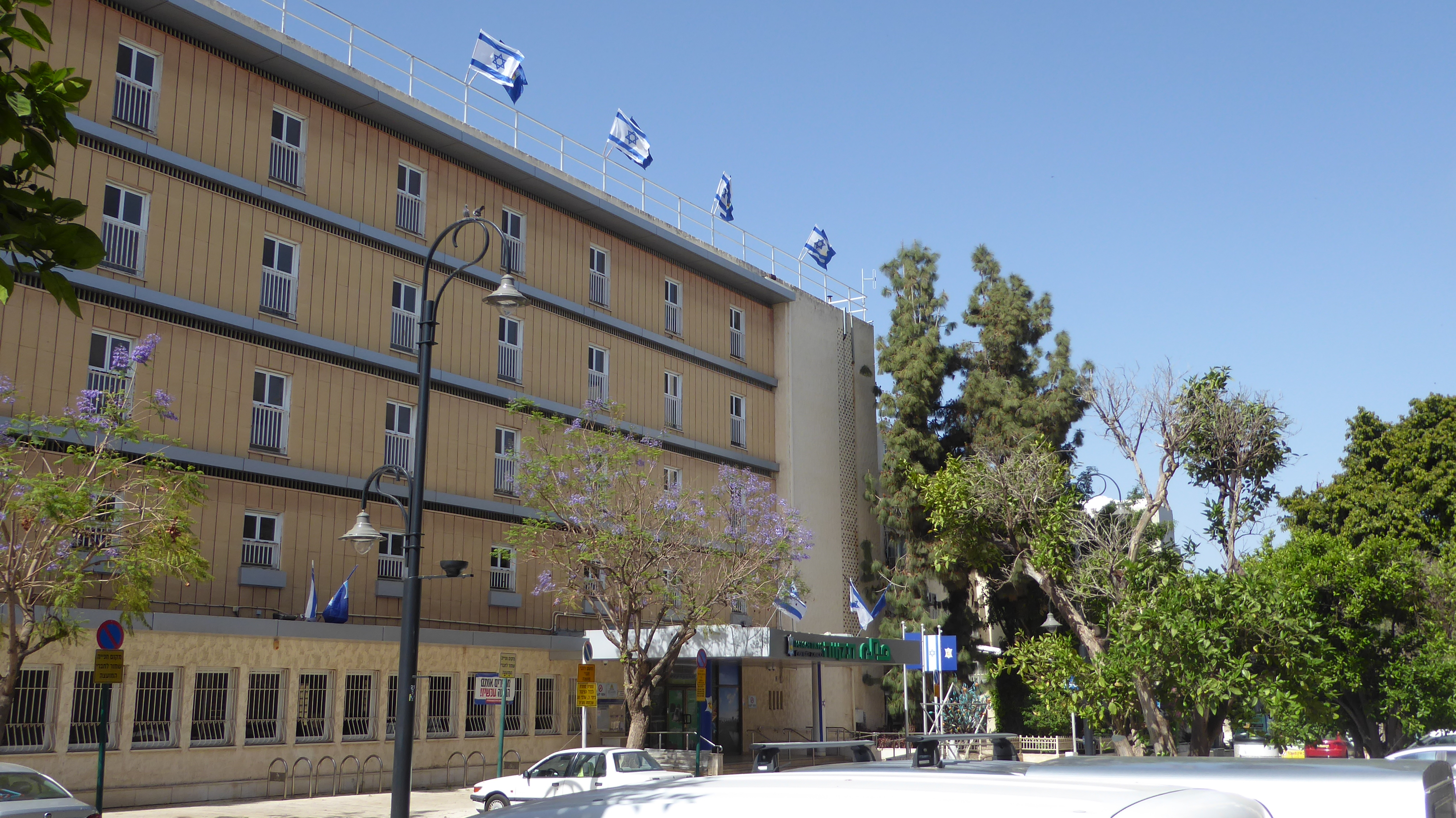
Petah Tikva City Hall

Petah Tikva's history of government goes back to 1880, when the pioneers elected a council of seven members to run the new colony. From 1880 to 1921, members of the council were David Meir Guttman, Yehoshua Stampfer, Ze'ev Wolf Branda, Abraham Ze'ev Lipkis, Yitzhak Goldenhirsch, Chaim Cohen-Rice, Moshe Gissin, Shlomo Zalman Gissin and Akiva Librecht. This governing body was declared a local council in 1921, and Petah Tikva became a city in 1937. Kadima, the political party founded by former Israeli prime minister Ariel Sharon, had its headquarters in Petah Tikva.

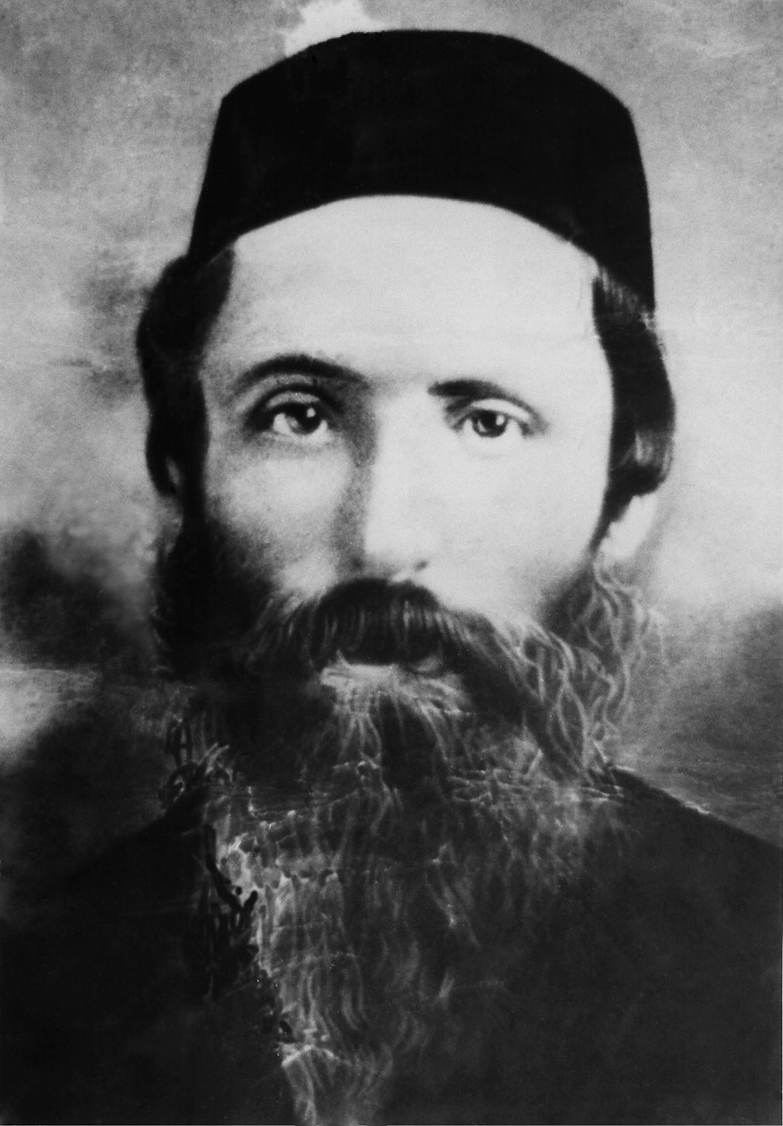
Yehoshua Stampfer

=== Council heads and mayors ===
- Shlomo Zalman Gissin (1921)
- Pinchas Meiri (1922–1928)
- Shlomo Stampfer (1928–1937)
- Shlomo Stampfer (1938–1940)
- Yosef Sapir (1940–1950)
- Mordechai Krausman (1951)
- Pinchas Rashish (1951–1966)
- Yisrael Feinberg (1966–1978)
- Dov Tavori (1978–1989)
- Giora Lev (1989–1999)
- Yitzhak Ohayon (1999–2013)
- Uri Ohad (2013)
- Itzik Braverman (2013–2018)
- Rami Greenberg (2018–)

== Voting Patterns ==
In the 2022 election, 56 percent of voters in Petah Tikva voted for the parties of the right-wing coalition led by Benjamin Netanyahu, while 41 percent voted for the parties of the center-left coalition led by Yair Lapid and 0.1 percent voted for the Arab parties.

In the 2026 election, 49 percent of voters in Petah Tikva voted for the parties of the right-wing coalition led by Benjamin Netanyahu, while 44 percent voted for the parties of the center-left coalition led by Gadi Eisenkot and 0.2 percent voted for the Arab parties. An additional 3.9 percent voted for the Reservists, and 2.5 percent voted for Amcha Yisrael. Voter turnout increased 12 percent from the 2022 election.

== Economy ==
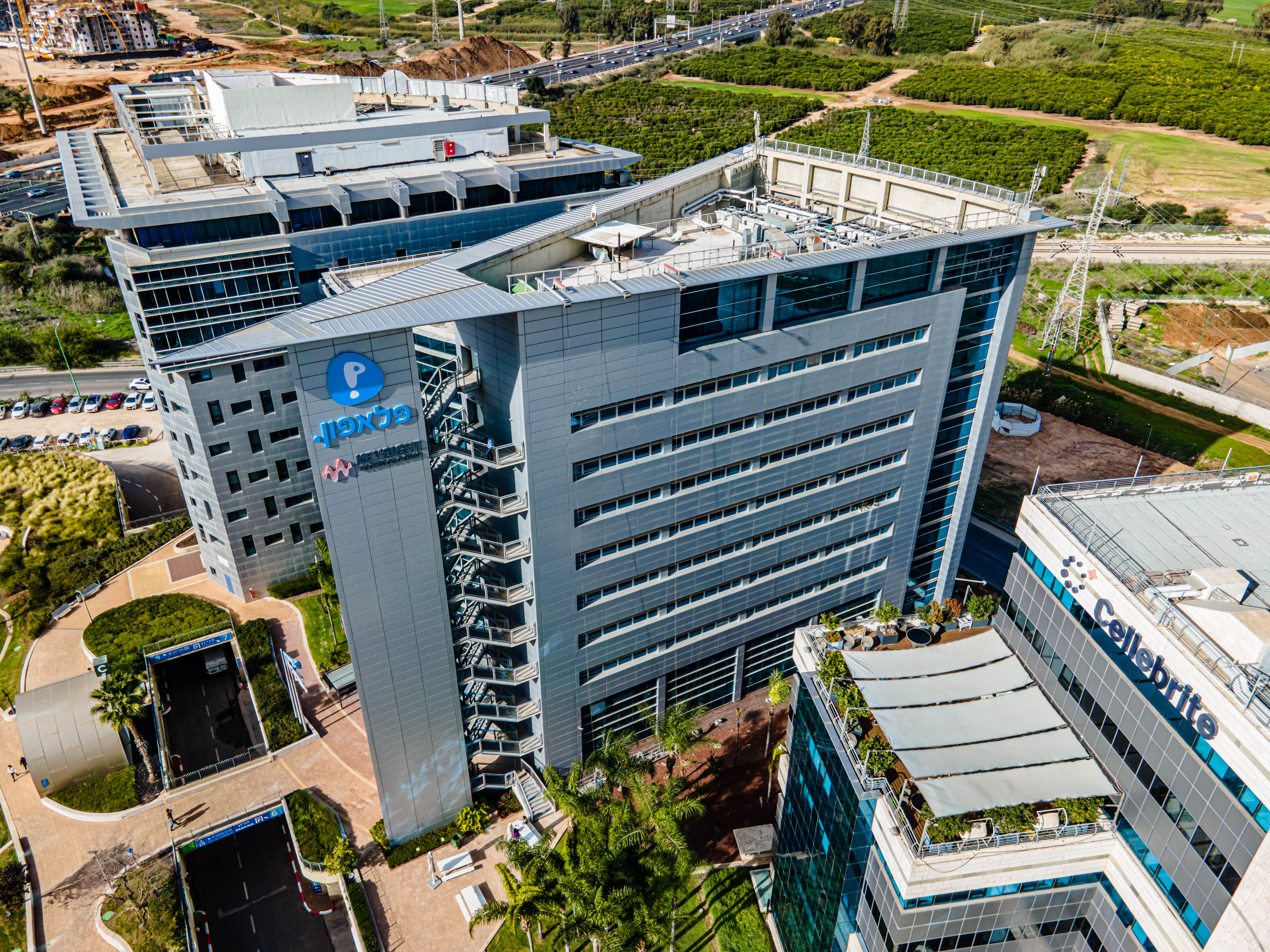
Azorim Park

Petah Tikva is the second-largest industrial sector in Israel after the northern city of Haifa. The industry is divided into three zones—Kiryat Aryeh (named after Arie Shenkar, founder and first president of the Manufacturers Association of Israel and a pioneer in the Israeli textile industry), Kiryat Matalon (named after Moshe Yitzhak Matalon), and Segula, and includes textiles, metalwork, carpentry, plastics, processed foods, tires and other rubber products, and soap.

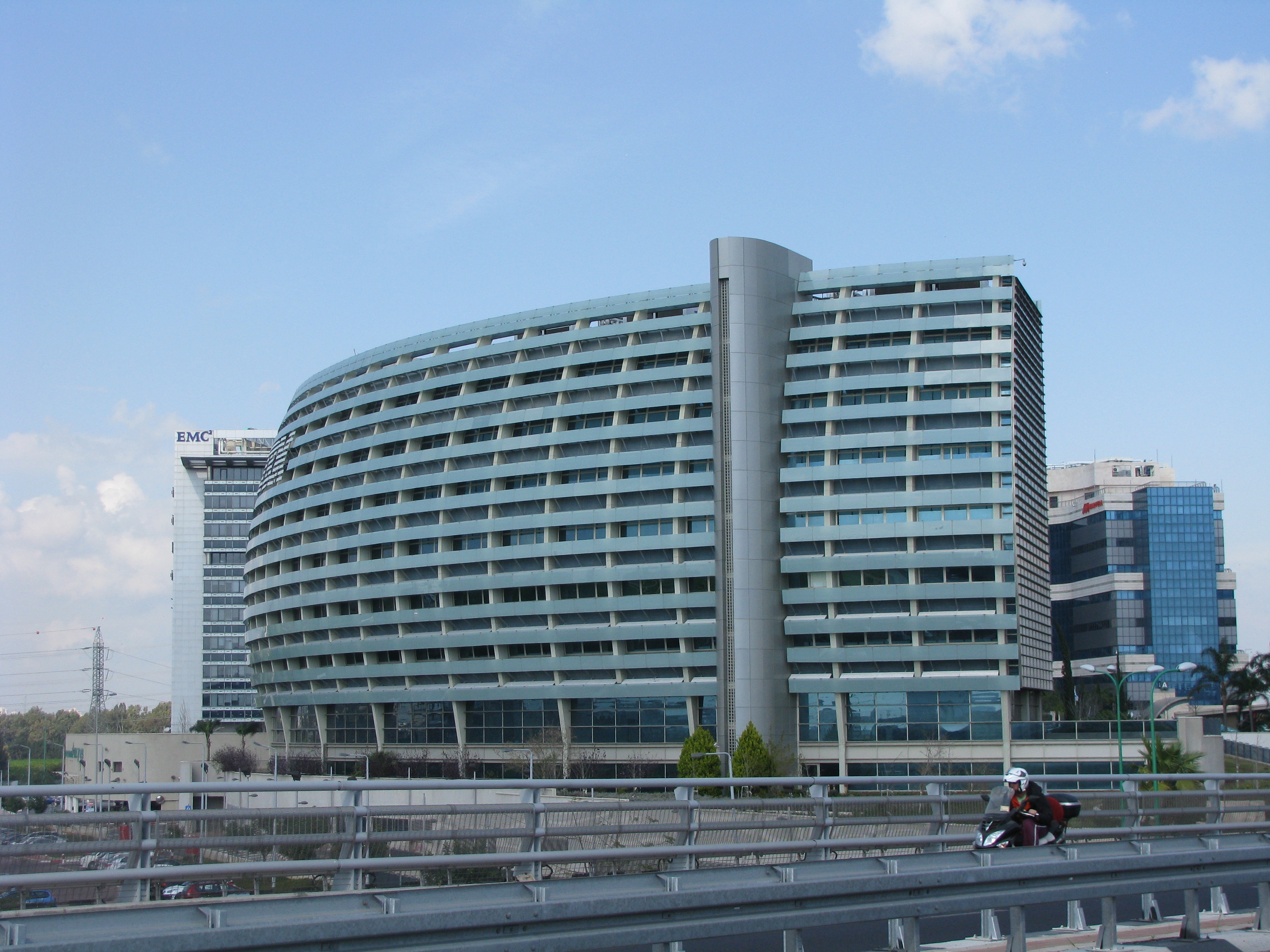
The IBM building in Petah Tikva

Numerous high-tech companies and start-ups have moved into the industrial zones of Petah Tikva, which now house the Israeli headquarters for the Oracle Corporation, IBM, Intel, Alcatel-Lucent, ECI Telecom, Gilat Satellite Networks, Gilat Telecom, Migdal, IDI and GSK plc company. The largest data center in Israel, operated by the TripleC company, is also located in Petah Tikva. Furthermore, the Teva Pharmaceuticals company, the world's largest generic drug manufacturer, is headquartered in Petah Tikva. One of Israel's leading food processing corporations, Osem opened in Petah Tikva in 1976 and has since been joined by the company's administrative offices, distribution center and sauce factory. Strauss Group is also based in Petach Tikva.

Over time, the extensive citrus groves that once ringed Petah Tikva have disappeared as real-estate developers acquired the land for construction projects. Many new neighborhoods are going up in and around Petah Tikva. A quarry for building stone is located east of Petah Tikva. As well as general hi-tech firms, Petah Tikva has developed a position as a base for many communications firms. As such, the headquarters of the Bezeq company is located in the Kiryat Matalon industrial zone as are those of the 012 Smile Telecom. The headquarters of Tadiran Telecom are in the Ramat Siv industrial zone. Arutz Sheva, the right wing Religious Zionist Israeli media network, operates an internet radio studio in Petah Tikva, where Arutz Sheva internet TV is located as well as the printing press for its B'Sheva newspaper. The Israeli secret service, Shin Bet, has an interrogation facility in Petah Tikva.

== Culture ==
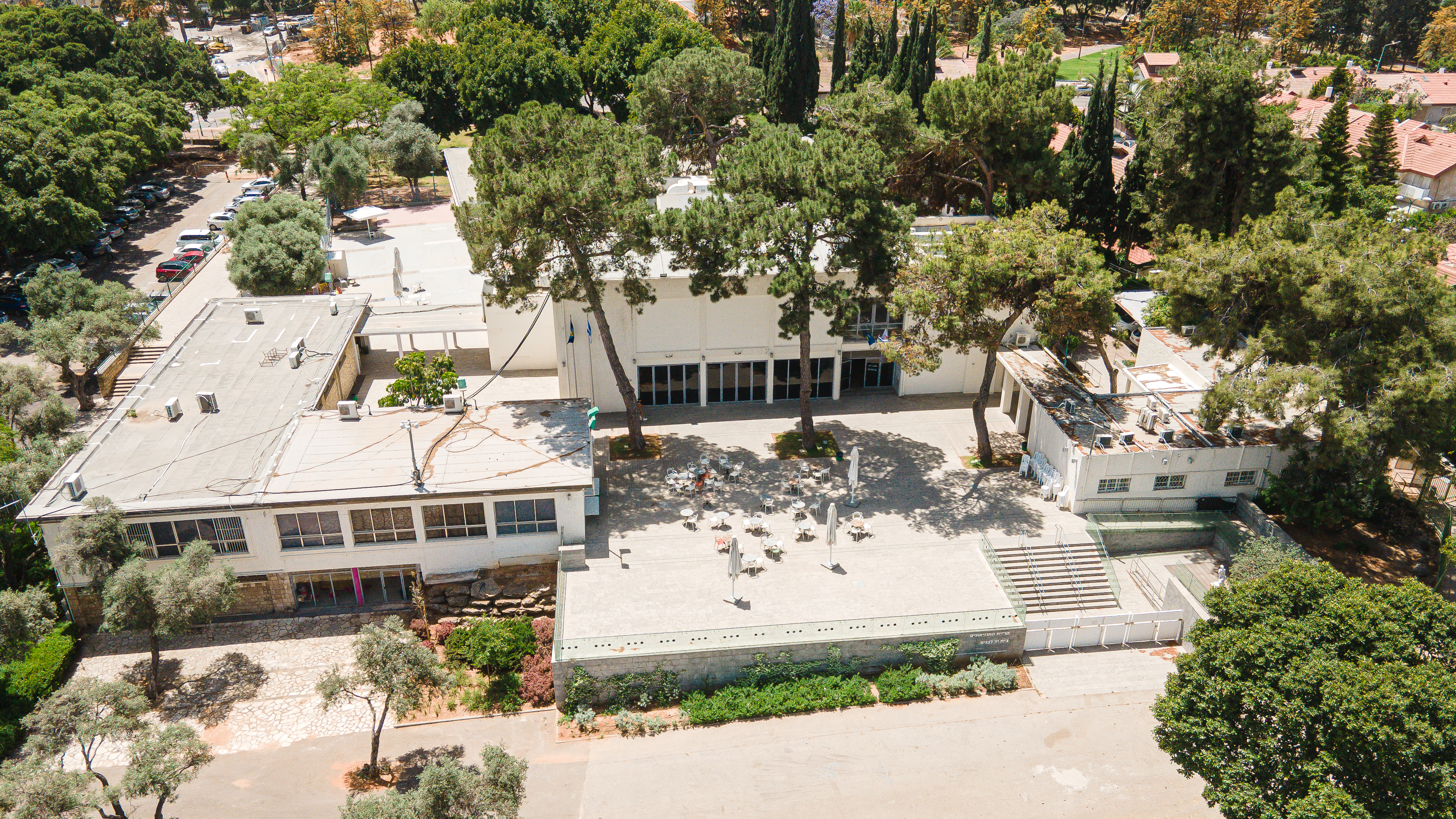
Petah Tikva Museum of Art

Petah Tikva's Independence Park includes a zoo at its northeastern edge, the Museum of Man and Nature, a memorial to the victims of the 1921 Jaffa riots, an archaeological display, Yad Labanim soldiers' memorial, a local history museum, a Holocaust museum and the Petah Tikva Museum of Art.

=== Sports ===
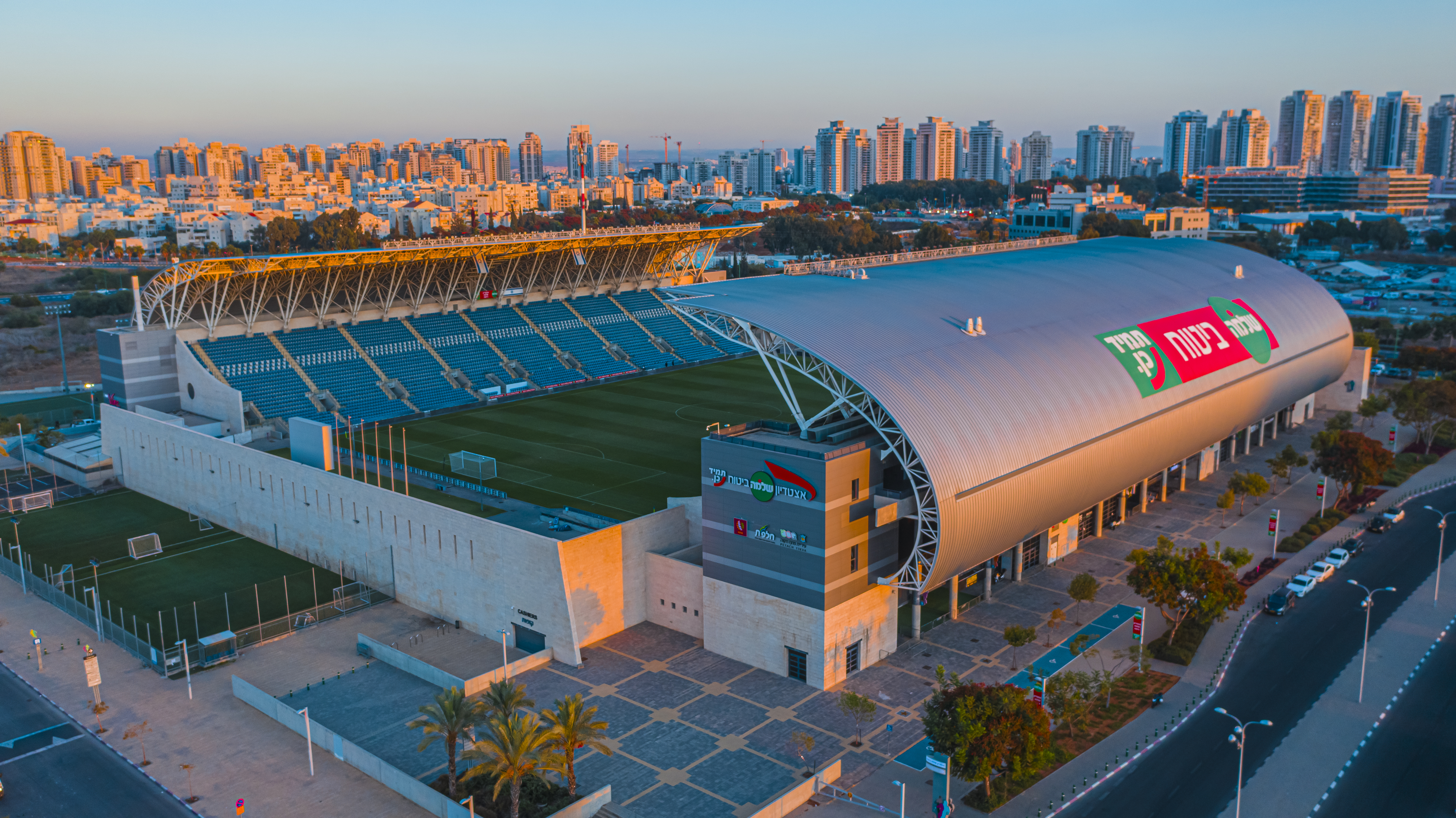
HaMoshava Stadium

The main stadium in Petah Tikva is the 11,500-seat HaMoshava Stadium. Petah Tikva has two football teams – Hapoel Petah Tikva and Maccabi Petah Tikva. The local baseball team, the Petach Tikva Pioneers, played in the inaugural 2007 season of the Israel Baseball League. The league folded the following year. In 2014, Hapoel Petah Tikva's women's football team recruited five Israeli Arab women to play on the team. One of them is now a team captain.

=== Archaeology ===
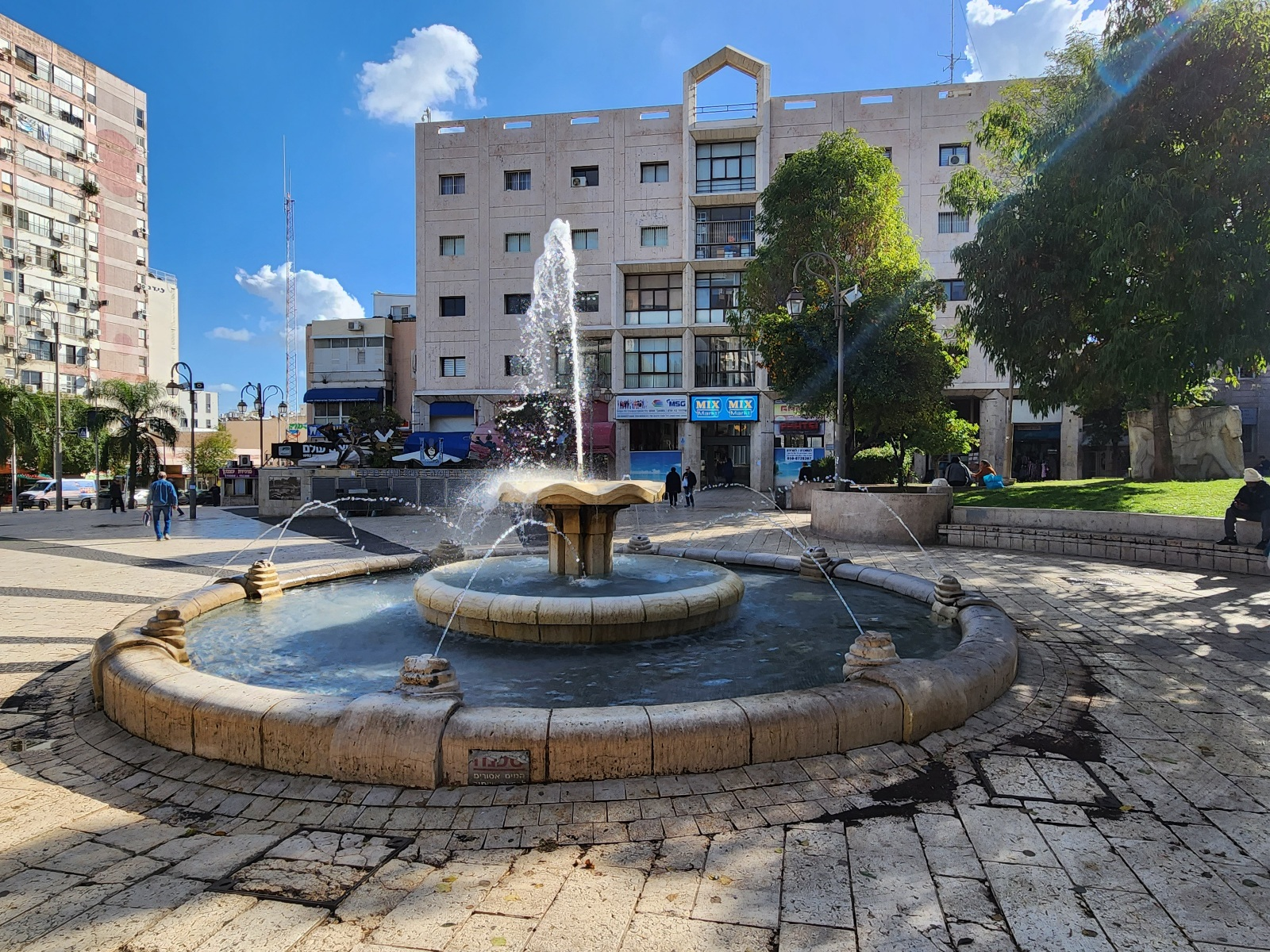
Founders Square

In November–December 2006 and May 2007, a salvage excavation was conducted at Tel Mulabbis, east of Moshe Sneh Street in Petah Tikva on behalf of the Israel Antiquities Authority. Four main strata (I–IV) were identified, dating to the Byzantine period (fourth–seventh centuries CE; Stratum IV), Early Islamic period (eighth–tenth centuries CE; Stratum III), Crusader period (twelfth–thirteenth centuries CE; Stratum II) and Ottoman period (Stratum I).

== Transportation ==
=== Bus ===
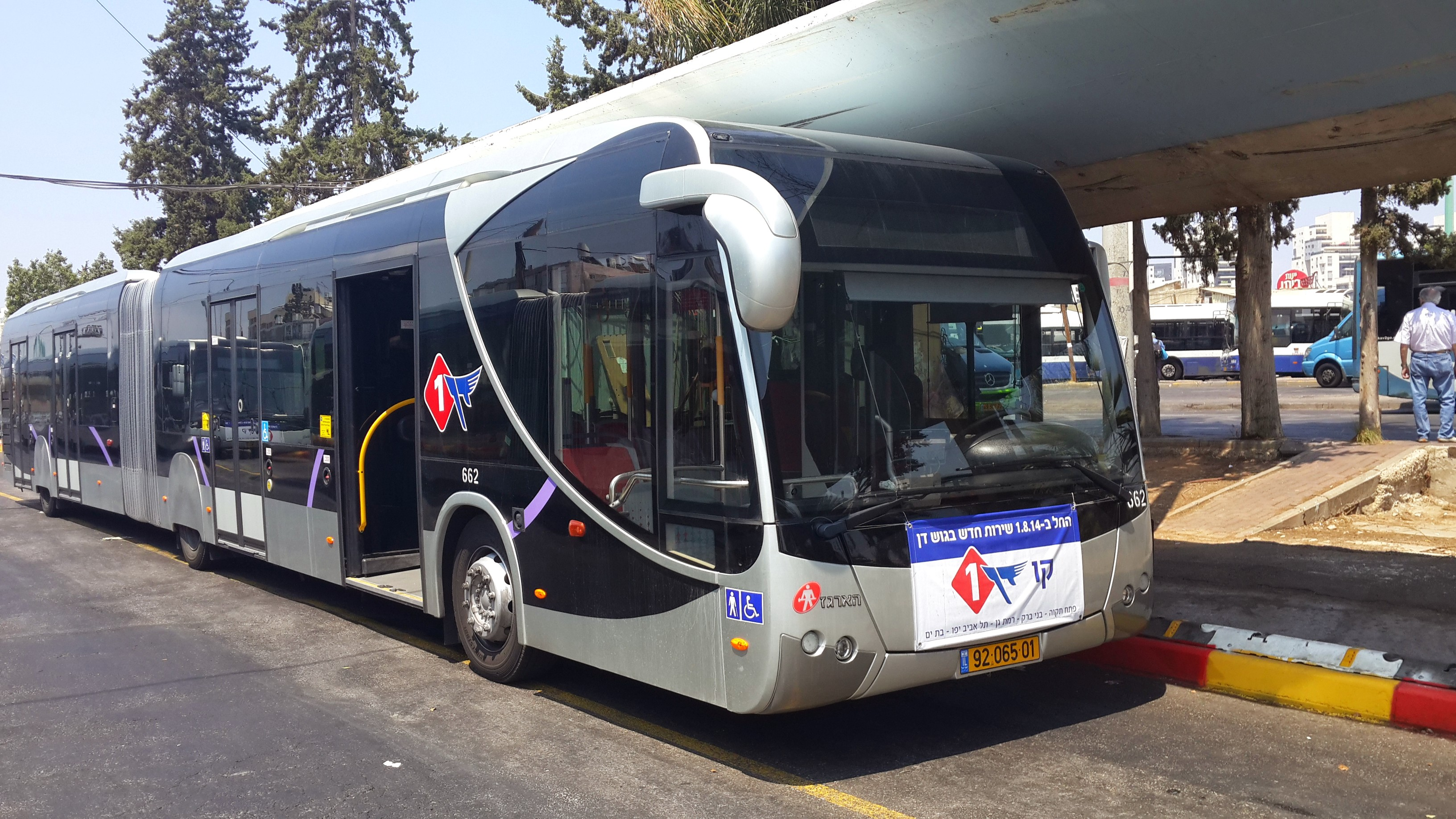
Petah Tikva central bus station

Petah Tikva is served by a large number of buses. A large number of intercity Egged buses stop there, and the city has a network of local buses operated by the Kavim company. The Dan Bus Company operates lines to Ramat Gan, Bnei Brak and Tel Aviv. Petah Tikva's largest bus terminal is the Petah Tikva central bus station (Tahana Merkazit), while other major stations are located near Rabin Medical Center and Beit Rivka.

=== Mainline rail ===
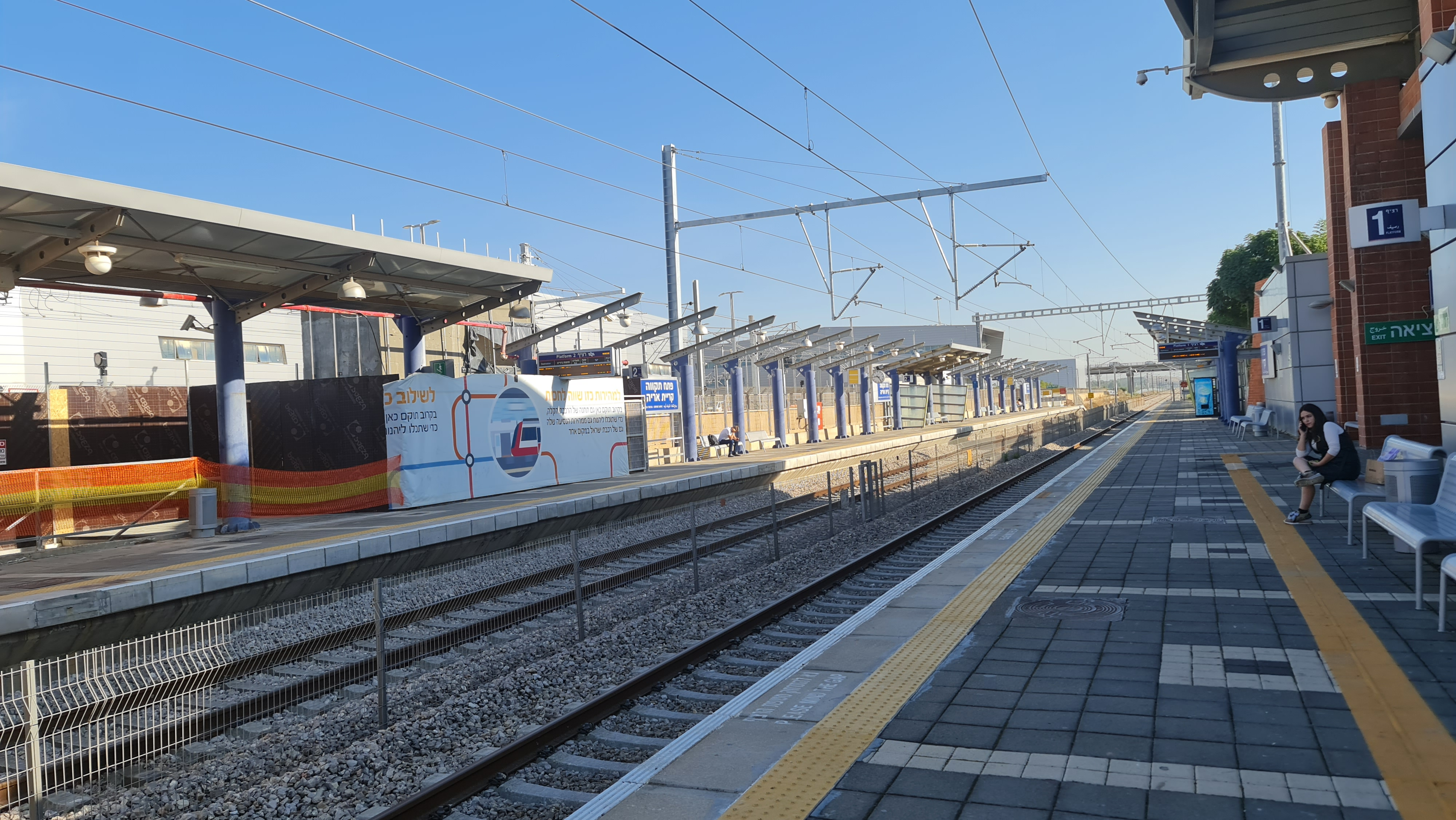
Kiryat Aryeh railway station

Israel Railways maintains two suburban railroad stations in Segula and Kiryat Aryeh, in the northern part of the city. A central train station near the main bus station is envisioned as part of Israel Railways's long-term expansion plan.

=== Road transport ===
There are eight taxi fleets based in Petah Tikva, and the city is bordered by three of the major vehicle arteries in Israel: Geha Highway (Highway 4) on the west, the Trans-Samaria Highway (Highway 5) on the north, and the Trans-Israel Highway (Highway 6) on the east.

=== Santiago Calatrava bridge ===
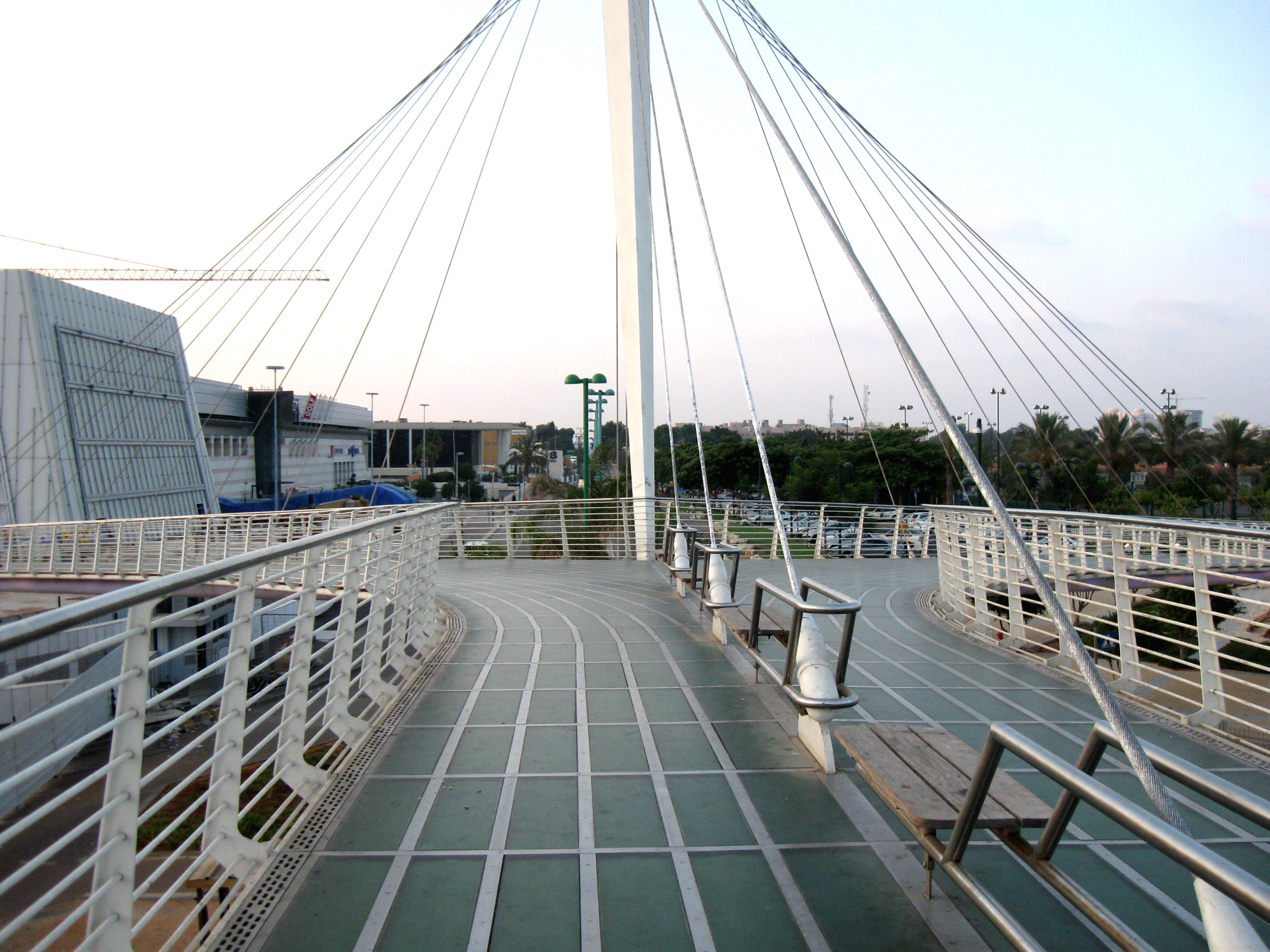
Santiago Calatrava bridge

Santiago Calatrava's bridge, a 50 metres (160 ft) long span Y-shaped cable-stayed pedestrian three-way bridge connecting Rabin Hospital to a shopping mall, a residential development and a public park. The structure is supported from a 29-metre (95 ft) high inclined steel pylon, which is situated where the three spans intersect. Light in construction, the bridge is built principally of steel with a glass-paved deck.

=== Light rail ===
The Red Line of the Greater Tel Aviv rapid transit/light rail system connects Petah Tikva to Bnei Brak, Ramat Gan, Tel Aviv and Bat Yam. The Red Line of the Tel Aviv Light Rail system is split into 2 branches upon entrance to Petah Tikva. One branch travels to an underground terminal at the Kiryat Aryeh railway station, while the other continues east to the Petach Tikva Central Bus Station. The Light Rail's train depot is also located at Kiryat Aryeh. It was opened to service on 18 August 2023.

== Notable people ==
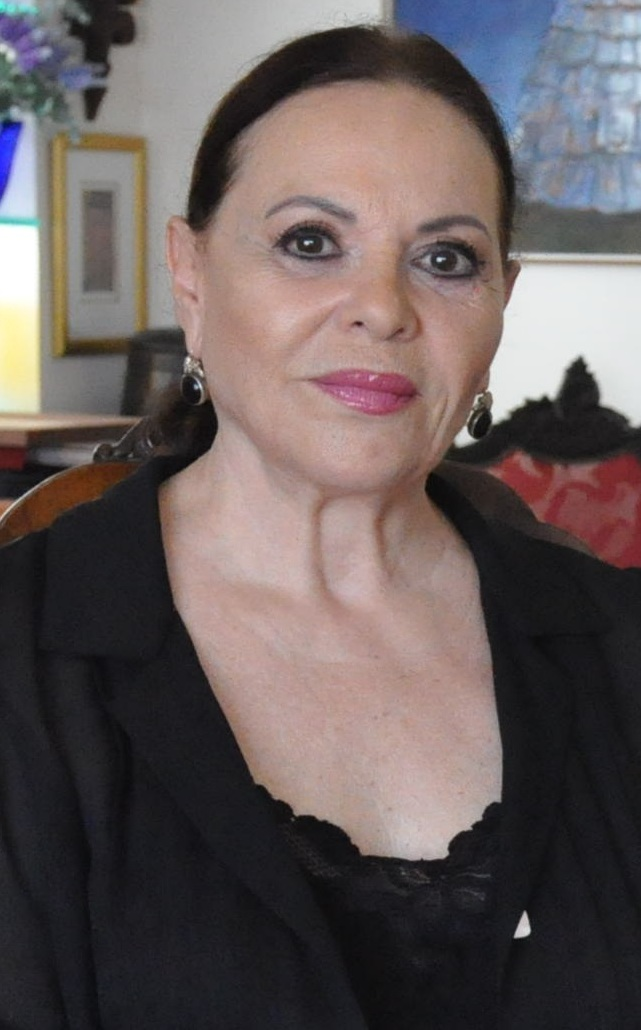
Gila Almagor

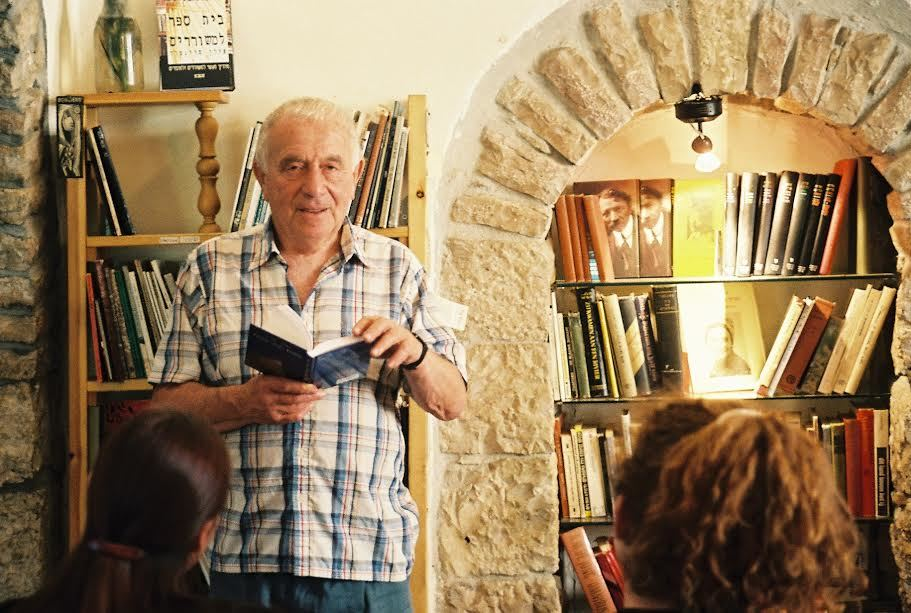
Yehuda Amichai

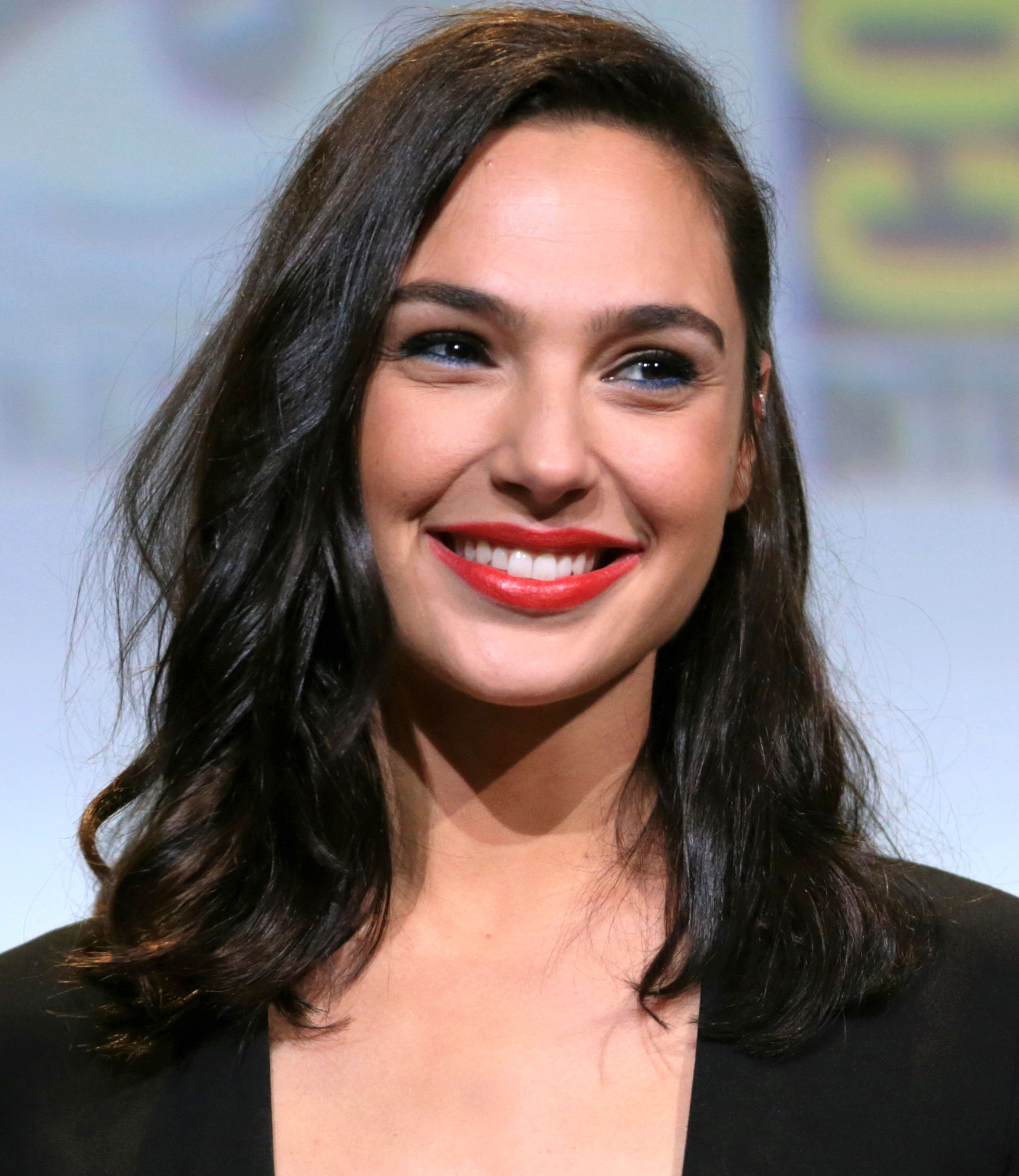
Gal Gadot

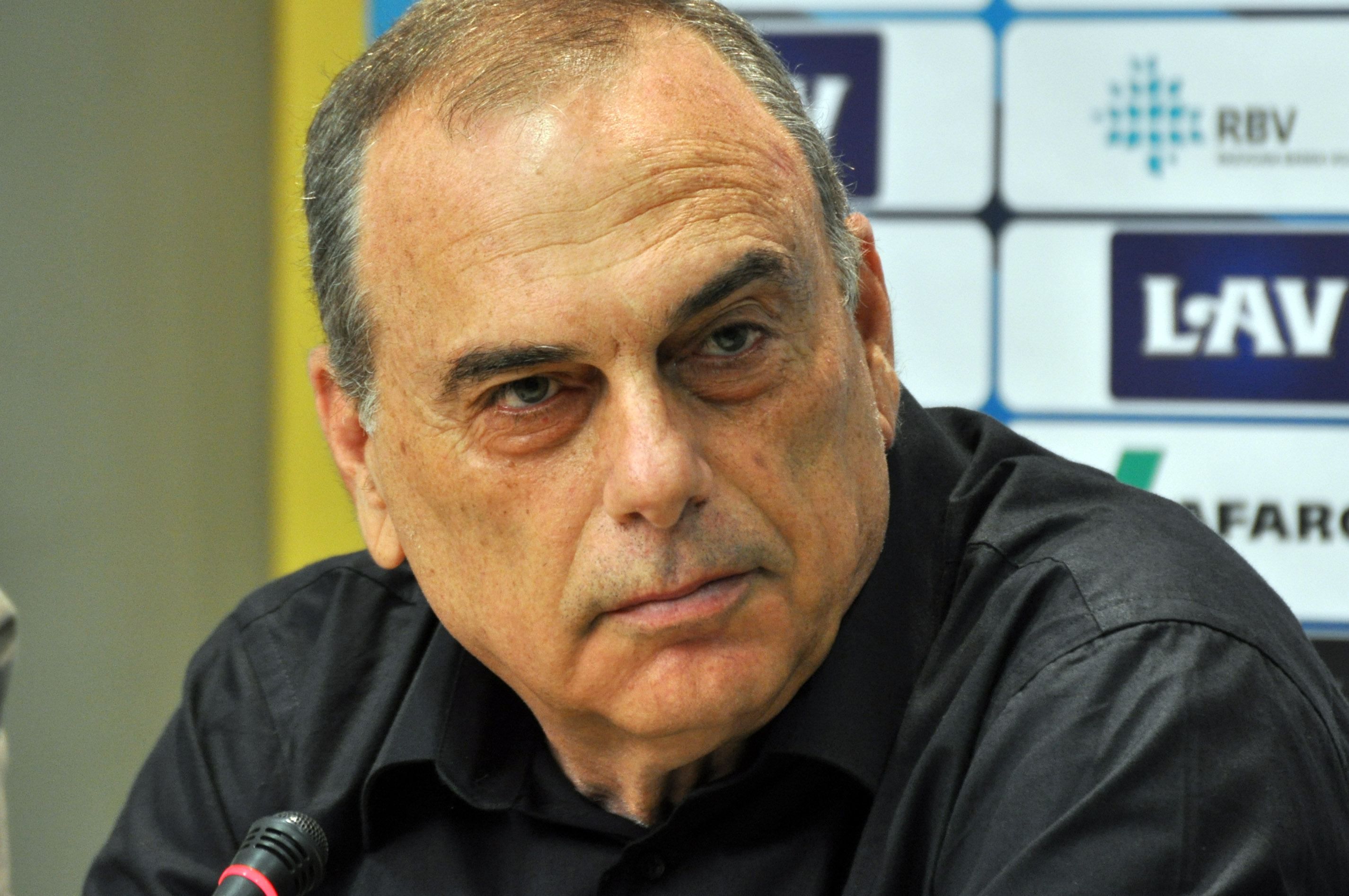
Avram Grant

- Gila Almagor (born 1939), actress and author
- Yehuda Amichai (1924–2000), poet and author
- Shlomo Baksht (born 1960), rabbi
- Hannah Barnett-Trager (1870–1943), wrote about early Petah Tikva
- Hanoch Bartov (1926–2016), author
- Mor Bulis (born 1996), tennis player
- Tal Burstein (born 1980), basketball player
- Moran Buzovski (born 1992), Olympic rhythmic gymnast
- Shmuel Dayan (1891–1968), Zionist activist
- Ofer Fabian (born 1962), footballer
- Israel Finkelstein (born 1949), archaeologist
- Dudu Fisher (born 1951), cantor and stage performer
- Gal Gadot (born 1985), actress and model
- Zehava Gal-On (born 1956), Meretz politician
- Aaron David Gordon (1856–1922), Labor Zionist ideologue
- Tamar Gozansky (born 1940), politician
- Avraham Grant (born 1955), football coach
- Tzofit Grant (born 1964), television personality
- Tzachi Halevy (born 1975), film and television actor, singer
- Simcha Jacobovici (born 1953), filmmaker
- Doron Jamchi (born 1961), basketball player
- Nimrod Kamer (born 1981), poet and class warrior residing in London
- Yosef Karduner (born 1969), Hasidic singer-songwriter
- Haim Kaufman (1934–1995), Knesset member
- Yehoshua Kenaz (1937–2020), novelist
- Itzik Kol (1932–2007), television and movie producer
- Alona Koshevatskiy (born 1997), Olympic rhythmic gymnast
- Amnon Krauz (born 1952), Olympic swimmer
- Talya Lavie (born 1978), filmmaker
- Karina Lykhvar (born 1998), Olympic rhythmic gymnast
- Menachem Magidor (born 1946), mathematician, president of the Hebrew University of Jerusalem
- Samir Naqqash (1938–2004), Iraqi-Jewish author
- Zvi Nishri (Orloff) (1878–1973), physical education pioneer
- Uri Orbach (1960–2015), The Jewish Home politician, journalist and writer
- Elyakum Ostashinski (1909–1983), first mayor of Rishon LeZion
- Ravid Plotnik (born 1988), rapper and singer
- Esther Raab (1894–1981), Hebrew author of prose and poetry
- Leah Rabin (1928–2000), wife of Israeli prime minister Yitzhak Rabin
- Peretz Lavie (born 1949), expert in the psychophysiology of sleep and sleep disorders, 16th president of the Technion - Israel Institute of Technology, Dean of the Rappaport Faculty of Medicine
- Neta Rivkin (born 1991), rhythmic gymnast
- Pnina Rosenblum (born 1954), actress, fashion model, businesswoman and politician
- Michal Rozin (born 1969), Meretz politician
- Rami Saari (born 1963), poet, translator and linguist
- Yosef Sapir (born 1902), former Mayor and Knesset Member
- Dan Shechtman (born 1941), winner of Nobel Prize for Chemistry
- Sigal Shachmon (born 1971), model, actress and television presenter
- Giora Spiegel (born 1947), football player and coach
- Nahum Stelmach (1936–1999), football player
- Zvi Arad (1942–2018), mathematician, acting president of Bar-Ilan University, president of Netanya Academic College
- Pnina Tamano-Shata (born 1981), politician
- Moshe Gaon (born 1964), businessman and political consultant
- Kfir Tsafrir (born 1990), singer-songwriter, rapper and music producer.
- Yossi Zabari (born 1972), actor, standup comedian, poet, spoken word artist
- Itay Zvulun (born 1984), rapper, singer, songwriter and actor
- Hayim Katsman (1991–2023), peace activist and academic

== In popular culture ==
Petah Tikva is referenced in the Tony Award–winning 2016 musical The Band's Visit as the main plot derives from a mix-up between the city and the fictional town of "Bet Hatikva" in the Negev desert of southern Israel.

Petah Tikva is known for being a part of a satirical conspiracy theory which claims that it does not exist, much like the German Bielefeld conspiracy. "Free Petah Tikvah" became a meme during 2023.

== Twin towns – sister cities ==
Petah Tikva is twinned with:

- Bacău, Romania
- Cherkasy, Ukraine
- Chernihiv, Ukraine
- Chicago, United States
- Las Condes, Chile
- Gabrovo, Bulgaria
- Gyumri, Armenia
- Kadıköy, Turkey
- Koblenz, Germany
- Międzyrzec Podlaski, Poland
- Șimleu Silvaniei, Romania
- Taichung, Taiwan
- Trondheim, Norway
- Norrköping, Sweden

== See also ==
- List of neighborhoods of Petah Tikva

== Bibliography ==
- Assis, Royee (24 December 2012). "Petah Tiqwa, Mahane Yehuda" (124). Hadashot Arkheologiyot – Excavations and Surveys in Israel. Archived from the original on 15 July 2020.
- Avneri, Arieh L. (1984). The Claim of Dispossession: Jewish Land-Settlement and the Arabs, 1878-1948. New Brunswick and London: Transaction Books. ISBN 978-0878559640.
- Barron, J.B., ed. (1923). Palestine: Report and General Abstracts of the Census of 1922. Government of Palestine.
- Ben Ezer, Ehud (2 December 2013). "The Yarkonim Affair" [פרשת הירקונים]. Ben Ezer News [חדשות בן עזר], no. 896 (in Hebrew).
- Glass, Joseph B.; Kark, Ruth (1991). Sephardi Entrepreneurs in Eretz Israel: The Amzalak Family, 1816-1918. Jerusalem: Magnes Press. ISBN 978-9652237514.
- Khalidi, W. (1992). All That Remains: The Palestinian Villages Occupied and Depopulated by Israel in 1948. Washington D.C.: Institute for Palestine Studies. ISBN 978-0-88728-224-9. Archived from the original on 21 March 2019.
- Marom, Roy (3 April 2019). "A short history of Mulabbis (Petah Tikva, Israel)". Palestine Exploration Quarterly. 151 (2): 134–145. doi:10.1080/00310328.2019.1621734. S2CID 197799335. Archived from the original on 29 May 2021 – via Taylor and Francis+NEJM.
- Mills, E., ed. (1932). Census of Palestine 1931. Population of Villages, Towns and Administrative Areas. Jerusalem: Government of Palestine.
