= Shlomo Baksht =

Israeli-Ukrainian rabbi (born 1960)

Rabbi Shlomo Baksht שלמה בקשט
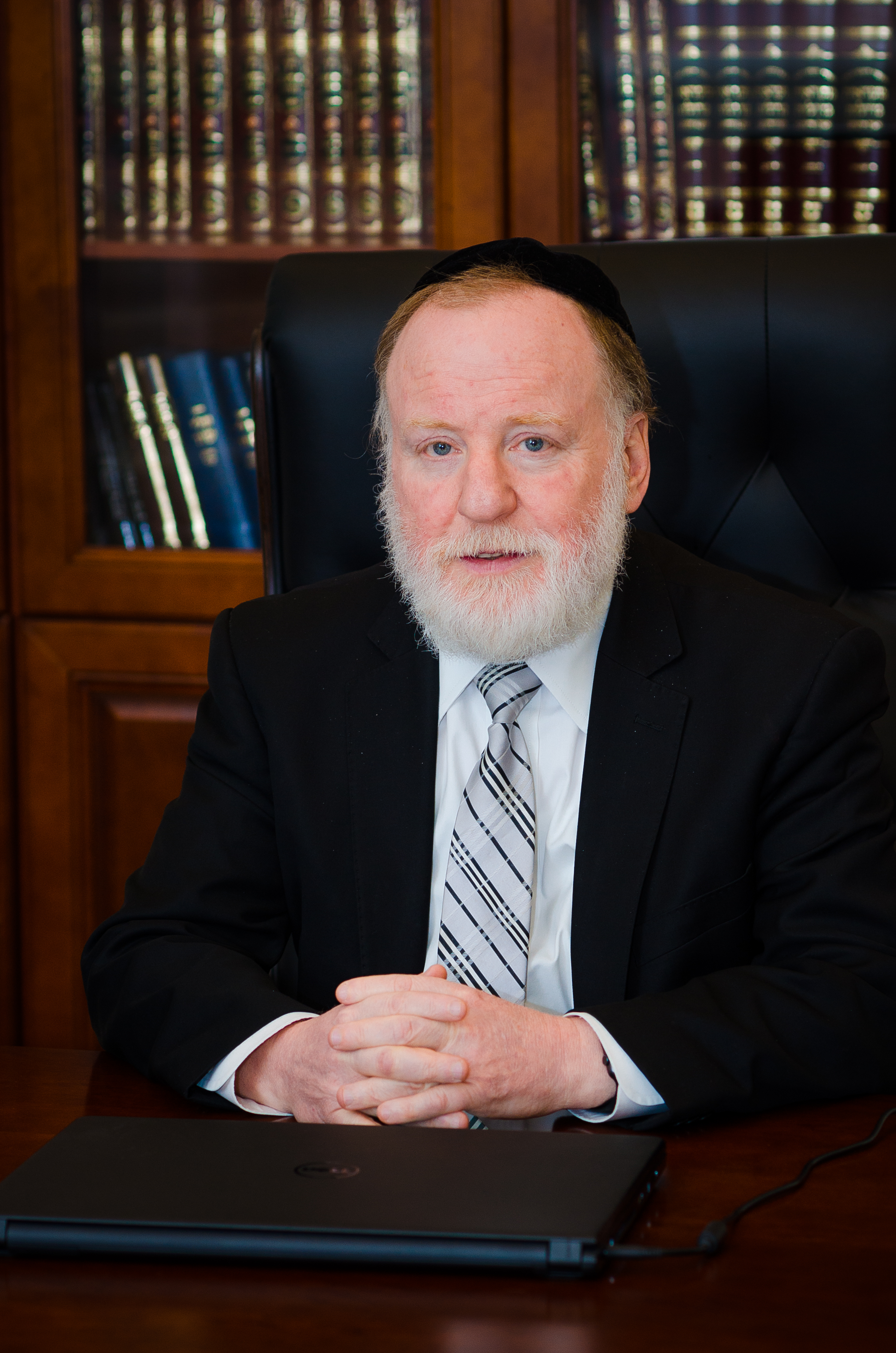

Personal life
- Born: 1960 (age 65–66) Petah Tikva, Israel
- Spouse: Hasy Baksht
- Parent: Rabbi Haim

Religious life
- Religion: Judaism
- Synagogue: "Or Sameah"
- Yeshiva: "Nahalat David"
- Position: Litvish rabbi
- Organization: "Tikva - Or Sameah"

Rabbi Shlomo Baksht (Hebrew: שלמה בקשט, Ukrainian: Шломо Бакшт born 1960 in Petah Tikva) is an Israeli-Ukrainian rabbi. He serves as Litvish rabbi in Odesa and Odesa Oblast and as the head of Odesa's Litvish community. He contributed to the dissemination and popularization of traditional Jewish values among the Jews of Odesa.

In February 2022, during the conflict between Russia and Ukraine, Baksht launched an expedition aimed at helping hundreds of Ukrainian children reach a place of safety during the Russian invasion. Baksht's rescue operation was carried out in vehicles, as according to Judaism it is only permitted to drive on Shabbat when lives are in jeopardy; Baksht had to do so to help those children.

== Early life ==
Rabbi Shlomo Baksht was born in Petah Tikva, Israel, in 1960 to an Orthodox Jewish family. His father, Haim Menahem, was the deputy chief rabbi of the Israel Defense Forces. Baksht studied in Talmud Torah Sheret Israel, he then went on to study at Yeshiva Of Israel, where he studied with a disciple of Jewish sage Hafetz Haim, rabbi Yakov Naiman. Later, he enrolled in yeshiva Nahalat David, which was founded by rabbi Boruch Shimon Salamon, chief rabbi of Petah Tikva at the time. Baksht married in 1985 (5 children and 5 grandchildren) and moved to Jerusalem.

== Career ==
In 1991 he along with his brother Dov founded kolel, Lamed Torah. He taught there until 1993 when he moved to Odesa by invitation of the Jewish community. In 1994, he founded a Jewish school, and two years later a boarding-school for foreign students. In 1998, the Jewish community of Odesa moved to open a new synagogue that is located in the heart of town at the intersection of Rishelevskaya and Evreyskaya. Daily prayers, holiday seminars and lectures on Jewish traditions are offered. In 2000 a mikveh was constructed.

In 2003 Baksht created the Jewish University of Odesa which enrolls over 200 students. In 2010, he created yeshiva Ateret Hameleh. Graduates from Ateret Hameleh are now teaching and studying in Yeshivas of Israel and CIS.
