= Bnei Baruch =

Universalist Kabbalah association

- Formation: early 1990s
- Founder: Michael Laitman
- Type: Kabbalah
- Headquarters: Petach Tikva, Israel
- Website: www.kabbalah.info

Bnei Baruch (also known as Kabbalah Laam, Hebrew: קבלה לעם) is a universalist kabbalah association founded by Michael Laitman in the early 1990s. It is estimated to have around 50,000 students in Israel, and some 150,000 around the world.

== History ==
Bnei Baruch is a group teaching Kabbalah in the tradition of the Yehudah Ashlag (Hasidic rabbi). Rabbi Yehuda Ashlag emigrated from Poland to the Yishuv in what was then Palestine in 1921. He wrote a commentary on the Zohar called the Sulam (Ladder). He became very popular in Israel, and was consulted on Kabbalah by the first Prime Minister of the State of Israel, David Ben Gurion. Relying on his claim that the statement “Love thy friend as thyself”, Yehuda Ashlag proposed a theory of "altruistic communism," a form of socialism based on principles of altruism and different from Soviet-style, materialistic communism.

Yehuda Ashlag died in 1954. After his death, his disciples divided: some followed one of his associates, Yehuda Tzvi Brandwein (1904–1969), who had become Ashlag's brother-in-law through his second marriage. Brandwein's group is, directly or indirectly, at the origins of some contemporary Kabbalah movements, including the Kabbalah Centre of Philip Berg. Other disciples of Yehuda Ashlag accepted the leadership of two of his four sons: Benjamin Shlomo Ashlag (1907–1991), whose group remained comparatively small, and Baruch Ashlag.

In order to fight an attempt by Baruch Ashlag's brother, Benjamin Shlomo Ashlag, to assert his version of their father's work in British courts, Laitman founded Bnei Baruch ("Sons of Baruch"). Gradually, the group developed. Its internal sources report that the breakthrough came in 1997, when the group started offering free Kabbalah courses through the Internet and radio (television followed in 2007), and eventually moved its headquarters from Haredi Bnei Brak to nearby (and more cosmopolitan) Petah Tikvah. Through the Internet, Bnei Baruch started gathering members throughout the world.

== Doctrine ==
Laitman conducts open daily 03:00–06:00 and 18:00–20:00 lessons, either live (normally in Petah Tikva) or through the Internet. The lessons are translated live into eight languages, including English, Russian, Chinese, Turkish, Italian, Japanese, as well as into seven other languages in recording (among them Arabic). Many Bnei Baruch students follow these lessons, and every student is free to choose his or her own study routine. Bnei Baruch also has 27 centers throughout Israel and over 150 centers worldwide, where Laitman's students teach weekly introductory courses. In these courses, there is no separation between males and females, whereas in the daily morning and evening lessons men and women study separately, although the separation assumes different forms in different countries. As noted by Italian scholars of new religious movements, Massimo Introvigne, this separation “has raised eyebrows among critics” but “is not unprecedented in Kabbalistic schools and continues the practice of Baruch Ashlag.”

He claims what he teaches is not a religion, but a science. Laitman's basic principle of Kabbalah is "love thy friend as thy self" as a pathway to the attainment of the Creator. Opponents claim that this view is not supported by the majority of Kabbalistic texts, both historical and contemporary. Laitman teaches that Abraham was not a Jew but a Babylonian. According to Laitman, in the days of Abraham the Babylonians faced a crisis of spiking egotism that separated them from each other and disintegrated their society. The quest to find the source of this social crisis, eventually led Abraham to discover the Creator (which Laitman, following Yehuda Ashlag, defines as the force of love and bestowal). Abraham realized that the bust of egotism was only an opportunity for the Babylonians to unite on a higher level and discover the Creator, and began spreading this notion among the residents of Babylon.

According to Laitman, the small group of students that gathered around Abraham was eventually called "Israel," after their desire to cling to the Creator (from the words Yashar El, meaning “straight toward the Creator”). As summarized by Myers, Bnei Baruch teaches that this group had “a spiritual designation” rather than an ethnic or religious one, indicating a practice based on Abraham's method centered around the unity above the growing ego. Although Abraham gathered only a small group, his wisdom gradually conquered a significant number of followers, which developed over time and culminated in the building of Solomon's Temple and the Second Temple. Eventually, however, the ego took over, the First and the Second Temples were destroyed, and the “Jews” scattered among the nations. The purpose of this scattering of the Jews among the nations was to eventually bring about the reform (“correction”) of the whole world.

A key component in this development of the nation of Israel and humankind, Bnei Baruch maintains, is desire, which is composed of different levels. The first corresponds to the development of basic desires, such as for food, sex and shelter. The next three degrees in the development of desire refer to social levels – desires to have property, gain fame and control, and eventually to possess knowledge about reality. The development of these desires is regarded as the catalyst of human development, i.e. when the desire develops, humanity comes up with a technological way to satisfy this growing desire in the form of a new and more advanced technology. The fifth, and last, level of desire to develop is the spiritual desire. The spiritual desire develops as a feeling of dissatisfaction with the fulfillments of the desires on the lower levels, and generates an existential inquiry in the person, most notably verbalized by the question, "What is the meaning of life?" It was, Bnei Baruch teaches, once rare, which is why Rabbi Simeon bar Yochai ordered to keep the Kabbalah secret. However, the more the world declined over the centuries into a spiritual crisis, the more souls with spiritual desire appeared. This was why Isaac Luria, according to Bnei Baruch, opened the study of the Kabbalah to all Jews, and Yehuda Ashlag started extending it to non-Jews as well. From the end of the 20th century, Bnei Baruch insists, the method of connection and overcoming of the ego that the movement believes was discovered in Babylon by Abraham, and developed by Kabbalists over millennia, must spread to the masses.

Two key notions of Bnei Baruch's doctrine are correction and connection. Correction, a core concept in Kabbalah in general, means the continuous effort of moving from hate to love, from egoism to altruism. The idea is that our world is still dominated by egotism and conflict, but we can "connect" at a superior level above our ordinary life. "If we connect correctly,” says Laitman, "we discover in the connections among us a special force" that we can also call God: "God is the force that humanity discovers through the right connections among people." Laitman claims that in the future, we will be able to realize Yehuda Ashlag's “altruistic communism” that, he insists, is “completely different” from Soviet-style communism: "We build a balanced society where the upper force, which is the force of connection and love, is among us and connects us, and by this we will achieve complete correction."

== Controversies ==
Bnei Baruch is criticized in Israel by three different groups.

First, some academic scholars of the Kabbalah in the tradition of Gershom Scholem regard Bnei Baruch's "pragmatic" Kabbalah as not philologically correct, nor true to the ancient sources. This criticism is mostly confined to the academic milieu.

Orthodox Jews insist that Kabbalah should be taught to qualified Jews only, and regard Bnei Baruch's dissemination of the Kabbalah to non-Jews as heresy and sacrilege.

Finally, some associated with the anti-cult movement regard Bnei Baruch as a cult, accusing it of a personality cult of its leader, of requiring exaggerated monetary contributions of disciples, and of brainwashing

As noted by Israeli scholars, Marianna Ruah-Midbar and Adam Klin-Oron, a unique feature of the Israeli anti-cult movement is that orthodox Jews and secular critics of religion strictly cooperate in several of its organizations, so that it is difficult to disentangle strictly religious and secular criticism of groups labeled there as "cults." As noted by Israeli scholar Boaz Huss, Bnei Baruch's practical, this-worldly approach to Kabbalah is very different from the academic reconstructions of Scholem and Moshe Idel and from Kabbalah as taught in the orthodox milieu, which explains part of the criticism. On the other hand, Italian scholar Massimo Introvigne has concluded, after a participant observation of the group in various countries, that Bnei Baruch students exhibit a disturbingly intense devotion to their teacher, and on-average devote more time and resources to the movement than followers of other spiritual movements. This attitude is common among cults. Criticism is also explained by the intense debate in Israel over who is "authorized" to define Kabbalah: academic scholars, Orthodox establishment people, or new, independent and unafilliated teachers such as Laitman.

== Michael Laitman ==
Michael Laitman was born in the Belarusian city of Vitebsk, in the former Soviet Union, (nowadays Belarus), in 1946. His followers call him with the honorific title of Rav or Rabbi, even though he has never been formally ordained as a rabbi, and he does not perform religious services.
