= Ashlag (disambiguation) =

Yehuda Ashlag (1885–1954) was a rabbi, Kabbalist and founder of the Ashlag dynasty.

Ashlag may also refer to:

- Ashlag (Hasidic dynasty), founded by Yehuda Ashlag

== People with the surname ==
- Baruch Ashlag (1907–1991), rabbi, and son and successor of Yehuda Ashlag
