= Avraham Mordechai Gottlieb =

Israeli rabbi

Abraham Mordechai Gottlieb
- אברהם מרדכי גוטליב
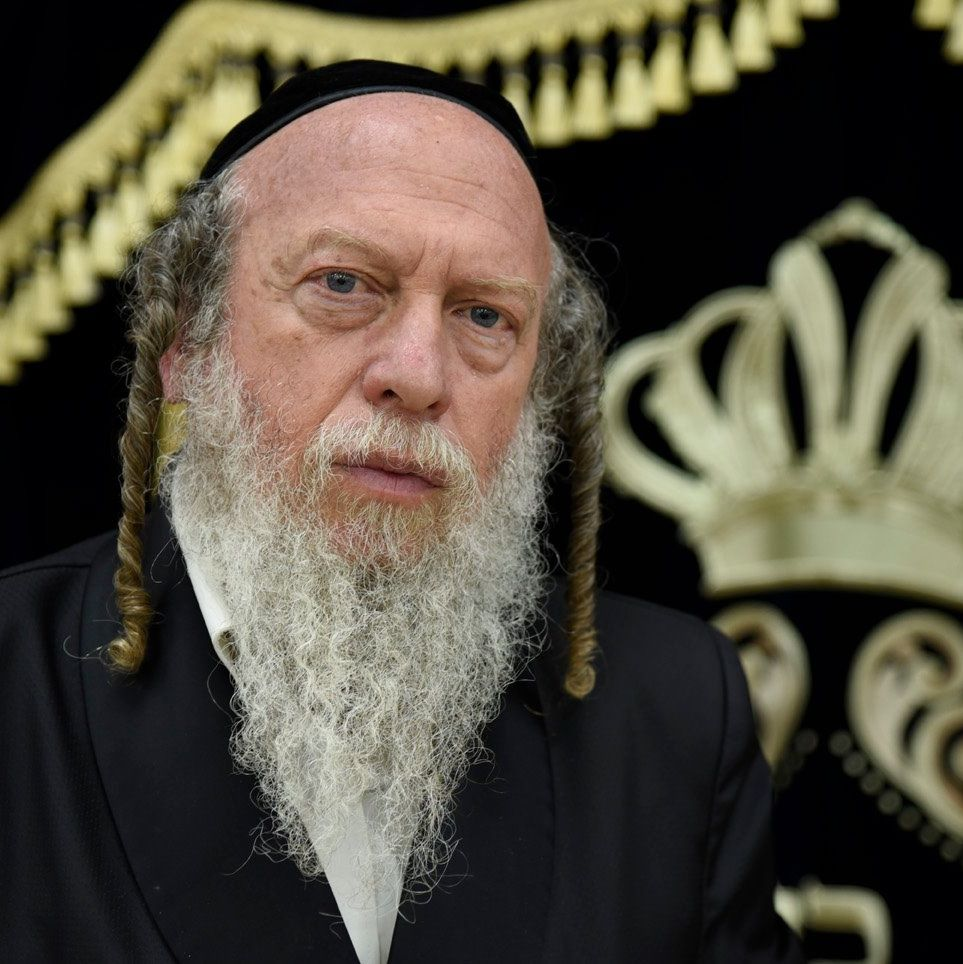
- Gottlieb in 2020
- Born: 7 January 1963 (age 63); Bnei Brak, Israel
- Occupation: Rabbi
- Spouse: Chana Matel Zilberfield (1986 - )

Abraham Mordechai Gottlieb (Hebrew: אברהם מרדכי גוטליב) is an Israeli rabbi, self-help guide, and Rebbe and leader of the Ashlag communities in Telse Stone and Tel Aviv.

He has compiled dozens of books on Kabbalah and self help. He teaches in the methods of Rabbi Yehuda Ashlag and Rabbi Baruch Shalom Ashlag.

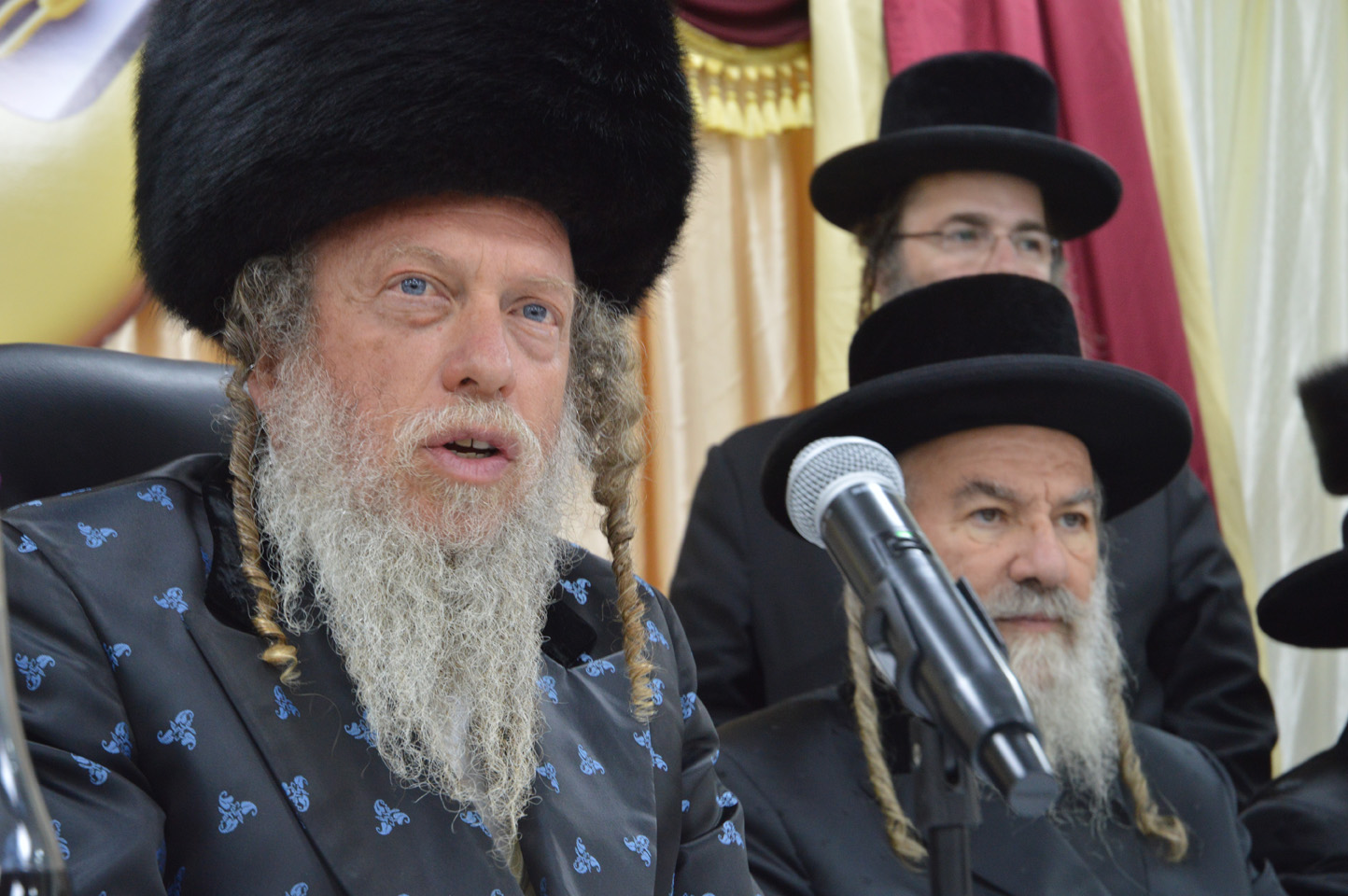
Rabbi Avraham Mordechai Gottlieb

== Biography ==
Gottlieb was born and raised in Bnei Brak. From a young age, he learnt from Rabbi Binyamin Shlomo Ashlag, one of the Ashlag rebbeim.

After fleeing his abusive household at the age of 9, Gottlieb became semi-homeless for a period.

From the age of 14, he began to learn with Rabbi Baruch Shalom Ashlag, the eldest son of Rabbi Yehuda Ashlag, as one of his youngest students.

After 14 years of learning with Rabbi Ashlag, he went on to study in Yeshivat Beit Meir from Rabbi Zalman Rothberg.

Already from a young age, with approval from Rav Ashlag, Rabbi Gottlieb began to teach married students in the ways of Kabbalah. Gottlieb would go on to become Rav Ashlag's personal assistant.

In 1993, Rabbi Gottlieb left Bnei Brak to settle in Telse Stone. A short time after that, he established the community 'Birkat Shalom' where he continues to lecture on Ashlagian Kabbalah.

== Teachings ==
Gottlieb, like Rabbi Baruch Shalom Ashlag, teaches Kabbalah according to the method of Rabbi Yehuda Ashlag. Ashlag's Kabbalistic method involves thorough textual analysis, similar to methods of Talmud study. In Rabbi Gottlieb's editions of the works of Isaac Luria, the commentaries of Rabbi Yehuda and Baruch Ashlag are utilised in a similar manner to the Rashi and Tosafot commentaries on the Talmud. This method garnered support from Rabbi Yitzhak Kaduri.

Rabbi Gottlieb's method of studying Kabbalah is to study the spiritual worlds from the perspective of the human world. This is in contrast to the Sephardic method, mainly perpetuated by the students of Rabbi Shalom Sharabi, who study Kabbalah in the abstract. This method is primarily focused on transforming an individual from the "desire to receive" to the "desire to give."

His views on various social issues are characterized by a marked social progressivism within a Haredi cultural context.

Most distinct in this is Gottlieb's feminist approach, where he believes women should be an integral part of public action, rigorous Torah study and self-employment, should they choose to be.

In regards to the LGBT+ community, and other minorities living in Israel, Gottlieb advocates for a broader tolerance of these communities by the Israeli public.

Gottlieb is a strong critic of the Israeli government's handling of the climate crisis and of the meat industry, and has advocated a reduction in the use of disposable plastics.

== Social Advocacy ==
As part of his efforts to promote social cohesion in Israeli society, Gottlieb lectures in institutions belonging to all sectors. He has done so at the Van Leer Institute and Bar-Ilan University, as well as various Dati and Haredi yeshivot.

Gottlieb has met with and taught multiple public figures in Israel, including Dr. Avichai Mandelblit, Tehila Friedman, Irit Mani-Gor, the philosopher Dr. Avraham Elkayim, Dr. Boaz Huss, and others. He has stayed in the house of Avri Gilad.

In August 2021, Gottlieb attended a lesbian wedding, and blessed the couple. The outcry from members of the Orthodox public lead Gottlieb to take a temporary hiatus from his rabbinic duties. Gottlieb clarified that whilst he did not agree with same sex marriage on a halachic basis, he is happy to bless anyone who requests blessings off of him. Gottlieb continues to welcome LGBT+ individuals to his congregation, and criticises Orthodox groups that shun them.

Gottlieb advocates for broader acceptance of Israeli Arabs and Palestinians in Israeli society, and has criticised discrimination against Israel's Arab Christian community.

Gottlieb opposes preventing public transportation on Shabbat.

== Published works ==
- Belevav Shalem - biographies and teachings of Rabbis Yehuda and Baruch Shalom Ashlag, as well as their students.
- Ma'agalot HaShana - articles addressing Jewish holidays and the weekly Torah portion according to the method of Rabbi Ashlag.
- Matan Torah - Various teachings of Rabbi Baruch Shalom Ashlag, with Rabbi Gottlieb's commentary.
- Talmud Eser Sefirot - A stylistic editing of Rabbi Yehuda Ashlag's commentary on Rabbi Isaac Luria's work.
- Hakdamot LeHokhmat HaEmet - A compilation of work by Rabbi Yehuda Ashlag with articles and comments by Rabbi Gottlieb.
- Petihah LeHokhmah HaKabbalah
- Pri Hakham Igrot - Annotations on the letters of Rabbi Yehuda Ashlag directed to his students.
- Birkat Shalom Maamarim - A collection of articles written by Rabbi Gottlieb from between 1984 and 1991.
- Brakha V'Shalom - Essays on fulfilling the religious and spiritual obligations of the Torah.
- Hashem Shemati Shemecha - Compiled teachings of Rabbi Baruch Shalom Ashlag as heard from Rabbi Yehuda Ashlag.
