= Ashlag (Hasidic dynasty) =

Polish Hasidic dynasty

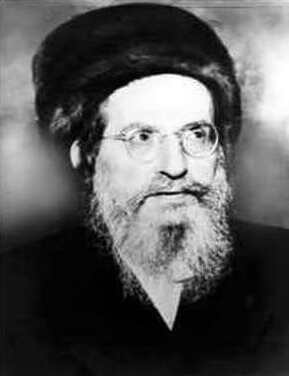
The Baal HaSulam

Ashlag (Hebrew: אשלג) is the name of a number of Hasidic courts that were established in Israel by the students and descendants of Kabbalist Rebbe Yehuda Leib Haleivi Ashlag from Warsaw, Poland, known as Baal HaSulam.

Although Hasidic dynasties are most often named for their town of origin, this dynasty is known by the surname of its rebbes.

There are a few Ashlag Rebbeim. The current Ashlag leader in Bnei Brak is Rebbe Simcha Avraham Ashlag. The leader in Telse Stone and Tel Aviv is Rebbe Avraham Mordechai Gottlieb. The leader in the Old City of Jerusalem is Rebbe Moshe Hayyim Brandwein, the Stretin Rebbe. There is an Ashlag community in Or HaGanuz in the north of Israel and one in Ramat Gan led by Rav Adam Sinai.

Rebbe Simcha Avraham Ashlag was born to Rebbe Shlomo Binyamin and Ahuva Liba Ashlag in 1948. As a child, he was close to his grandfather, the Baal Hasulam, who saw great promise in him and told him at age 6 to commence study of the Zohar together with his other studies at the age of 13.

Rebbe Avraham Mordechai Gottlieb was a close student of Rebbe Baruch Shalom Ashlag, the oldest son of the Baal HaSulam, learning from him starting at age 14.

Rebbe Moshe Hayyim Brandwein is the grandson of Rebbe Yehuda Tzvi Brandwein, a main student of the Baal HaSulam, who was ordained by Rav Kook and Rav Sonnenfeld. He leads the Kol Yehuda yeshiva opposite the Hurva synagogue as the Rebbe of Stretin.

Rabbi Adam Sinai studied with Rabbi Avraham Brandwein, Rebbe Baruch Shalom Ashlag and Rabbi Hillel Moshe Galbstein[he]. He leads the 'Sulam' community in Ramat Gan.

The non-Orthodox organisations Bnei Baruch and Kabbalah Centre claim descent from Ashlag hassidism.

== Lineage ==
- Rebbe Yehuda Leib Haleivi Ashlag (1885–1954), disciple of the rebbes of Porisov
  - Rebbe Shlomo Binyomin Haleivi Ashlag (1906–1983), son of Rebbe Yehuda Leib
    - Rebbe Yechezkel Yosef Haleivi Ashlag, (1935–2016), son of Rebbe Shlomo Binyomin
    - Rebbe Simcha Avrohom Haleivi Ashlag (1948- ), present rebbe, son of Rebbe Shlomo Binyomin - Rebbe in Bnei Brak
  - Rebbe Boruch Shalom HaLevi Ashlag (1907–1991), son of Rebbe Yehuda Leib
    - Rebbe Avraham Mordechai Gottlieb (1963 - ), present rebbe, student of Rebbe Baruch Shalom - Rebbe in Telse Stone and Tel Aviv
  - Stretyn Branch: Rebbe Yehuda Tzvi Brandwein (1903 - 1969).
    - Rebbe Avraham Brandwein (1945 - 2013), son of Rebbe Yehuda Tzvi Brandwein.
    - Rebbe Moshe Hayyim Brandwein, son of Rebbe Avraham Brandwein - Rebbe in the Old City of Jerusalem
