= Red string (Kabbalah) =

Red string worn to ward off misfortune

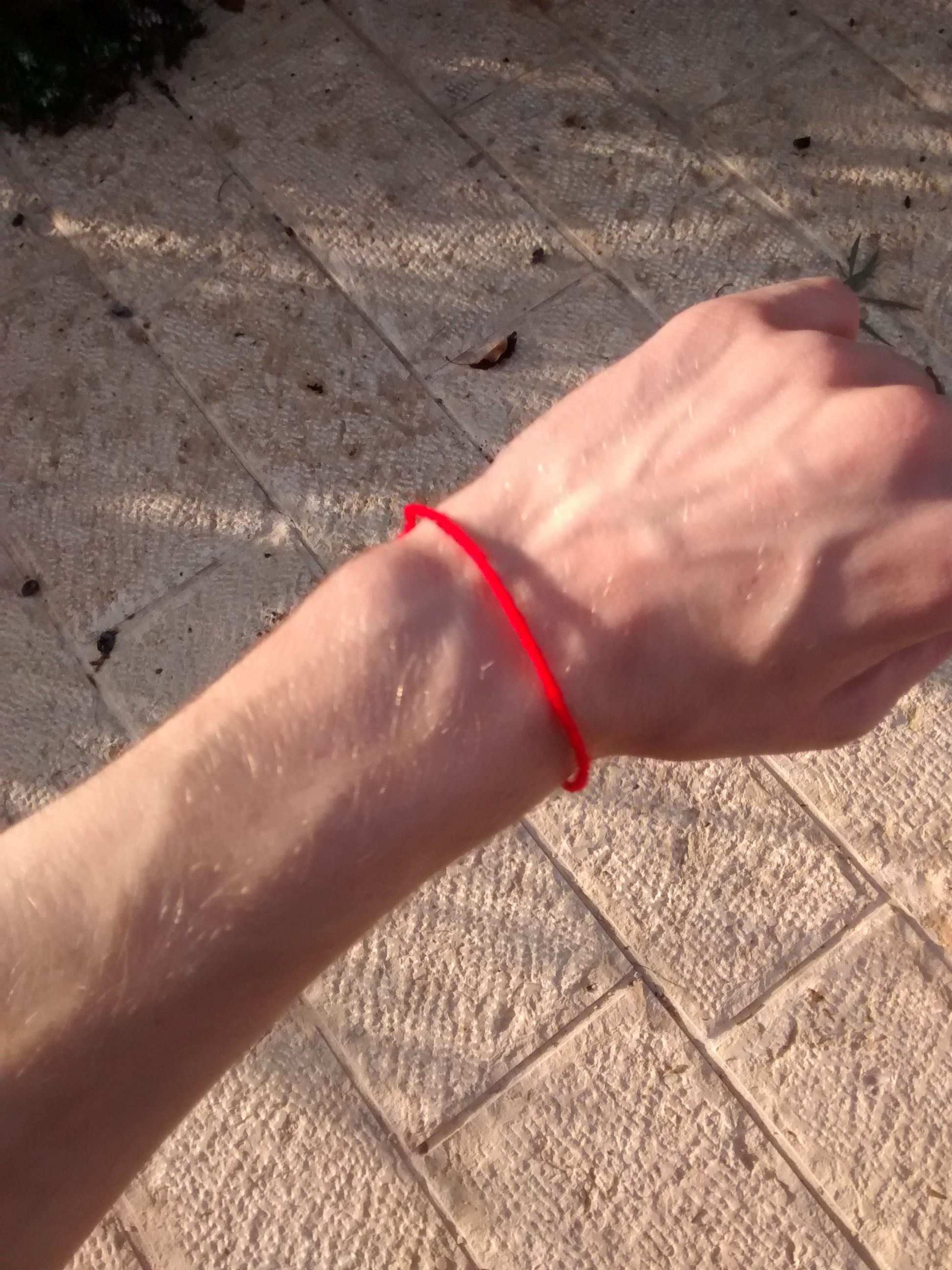
Red string from near the Western Wall in Jerusalem

Wearing a thin scarlet or a crimson string (Hebrew: חוט השני, khutt hashani) as a type of talisman is a Jewish folk custom which is practiced as a way to ward off misfortune which is brought about by the "evil eye" (Hebrew: עין הרע). The tradition is popularly thought to be associated with Kabbalah and religious forms of Judaism.

The red string itself is usually made from thin scarlet wool thread. It is worn as a bracelet or band on the wrist of the wearer. The red string is worn in many cultures and not founded solely in Jewish culture. Hinduism and Chinese culture have also worn a red string or bracelet for luck, love, and to ward off evil.

== Biblical history ==
A scarlet thread, tied about the wrist, is mentioned in Genesis 38. Tamar becomes pregnant by her father-in-law, Judah, and gives birth to twin boys. The following verses about this event are taken from the King James Bible:

Genesis, chapter 38:
27 – And it came to pass in the time of her travail, that, behold, twins were in her womb.
28 – And it came to pass, when she travailed, that the one put out his hand: and the midwife took and bound upon his hand a scarlet thread, saying, This came out first.
29 – And it came to pass, as he drew back his hand, that, behold, his brother came out: and she said, How hast thou broken forth? this breach be upon thee: therefore his name was called Pharez.
30 – And afterward came out his brother, that had the scarlet thread upon his hand: and his name was called Zarah.

As early as Rabbi Shmuel ben Hafni Gaon, Jewish commentators noted that the placement of a red string on one's hand may be a good omen. Some sources imply it may even be placed around a finger. Some early Jewish commentators (such as Aggadas Bereishis) write that Joseph's coat (given to him by Jacob) was actually the exact same as the coat of the other Tribes, just that Jacob placed a red string on the cuffs.

== Through the ages ==
There is no written mention in the Torah, Halacha, or Kabbalistic texts about requiring the tying of a red string around the wrist. Though sources mention red strings as a good omen, it is not evident if they were widely worn. The only case we find a public exhortation to wear red strings is in the 1490s: When Jews were not allowed to wear Tefilin, Rabbi Abraham Saba recommended Jews to wear a red string on their hands (to remember the commandment of Tefilin).

== Modern trend ==
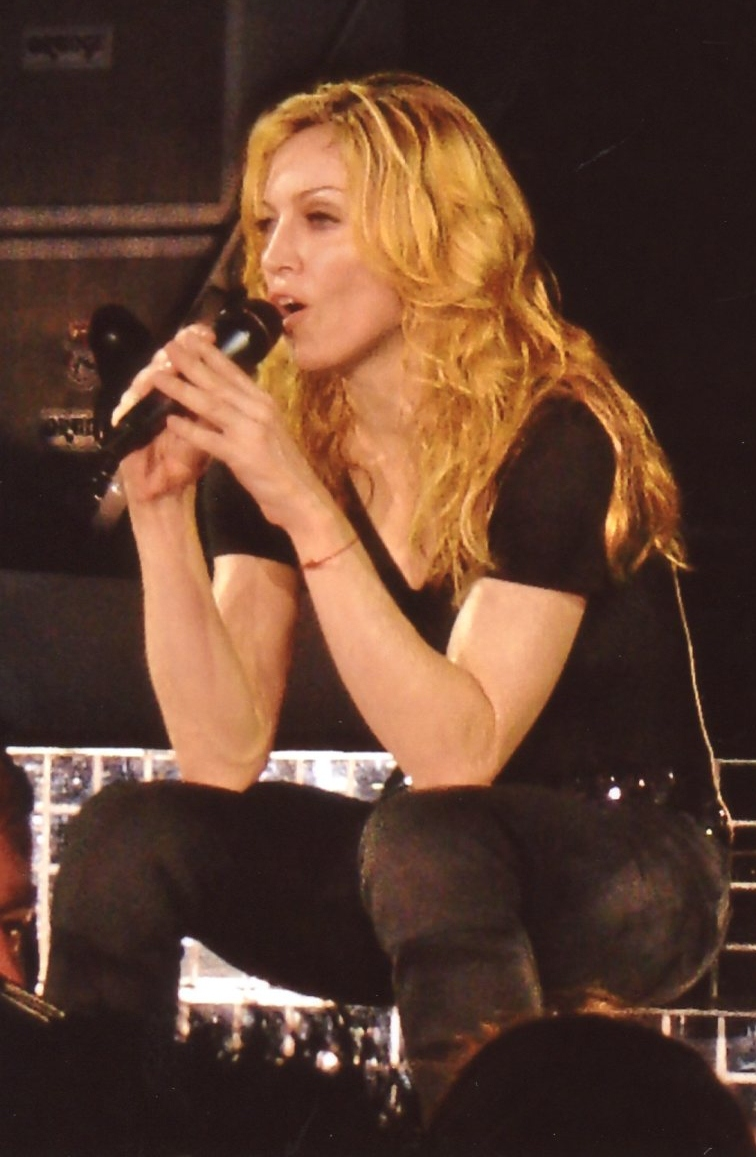
Madonna wearing a red string, on the 2006 Confessions Tour

In modern Israel, it is common to see elderly women peddling scarlet thread for pilgrims and tourists, especially in the Old City of Jerusalem. Outside of Israel in the late 1990s, the red string became popular with many celebrities, including many non-Jews, including Madonna and her children. Additional celebrities have worn the scarlet thread, such as Leonardo DiCaprio, Ariana Grande, Tucker Carlson & Jared Kushner. The wider popularity is often linked to Philip Berg's Kabbalah Centre. It also gained a surge in sales for Madonna according to editors of Changing Fashion: A Critical Introduction to Trend Analysis and Cultural Meaning (2007).

== See also ==
- Apotropaic magic
- Hamsa
- Practical Kabbalah
- Kautuka
- Raksha Bandhan
- Martenitsa

== Book sources ==
- Lynch, Annette; Strauss, Mitchell (2007). Changing Fashion: A Critical Introduction to Trend Analysis and Cultural Meaning. Berg Publishers. ISBN 978-1845203900.
