= Yehuda Berg =

American writer

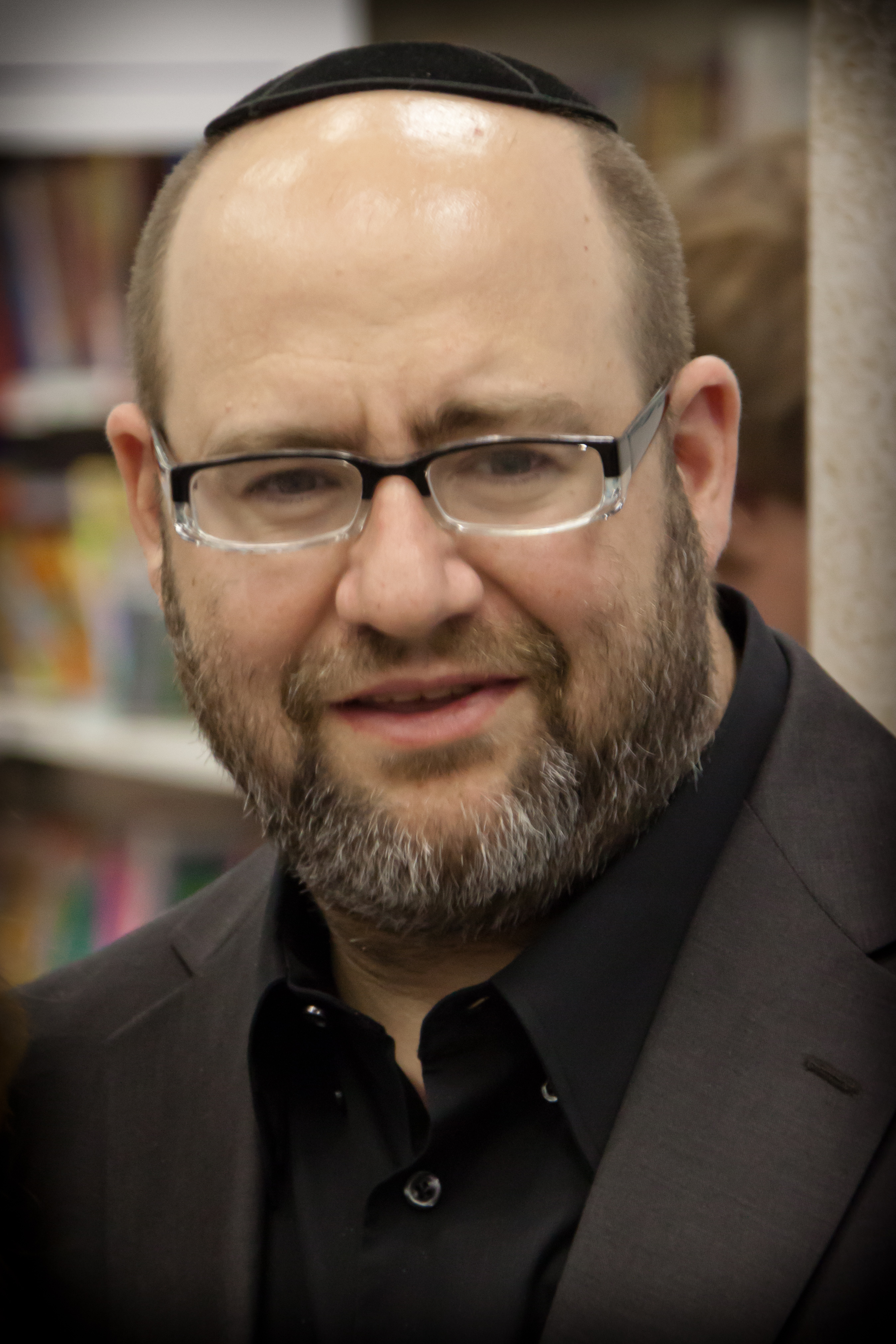
Yehuda Berg, 2012

Yehuda Berg is an American author and former teacher of Kabbalah. Until 2014, Berg was a co-director of the Kabbalah Centre, which was founded by his parents Philip Berg and Karen Berg.

Berg was an international speaker and author. One of his many books, The Power of Kabbalah, became an international best-seller as did another of his books, The 72 Names of God.

== Biography ==
Berg was born in 1972 in Jerusalem. Until May 2014, he was co-director of the Kabbalah Centre, founded by his father Rav Shraga Feivel (Philip) Berg. Following accusations of drug abuse and sexual assault, he withdrew from the organization.

== Works ==
He has written numerous works such as: The power of Kabbalah, The 72 names of god: technology for the soul, Kabbalah the power to change everything, Satan: an autobiography, True prosperity, Angelic intelligence, among others.

== Lawsuit ==
In 2014, a former student at the Kabbalah Centre brought a lawsuit against him alleging that he had assaulted her sexually. She claimed that Berg offered her alcohol and Vicodin while she visited him at his home and then made sexual advances.

In November 2015 a Los Angeles Superior Court jury found that Berg had acted with malice and was liable for intentional infliction of emotional distress and therefore, he was ordered to pay $135,000, which included a punitive damages component. The Kabbalah Centre itself was also ordered to pay $42,500 for being negligent in its supervision of Berg, who was one of its co-directors at the time of the alleged assault.

== Awards ==
In 2007, Berg was named Number 4 in Newsweek's list of America's Top 50 Rabbis.

== Bibliography ==
- The 72 Names of God: Technology for the Soul. Kabbalah Publishing. 2003. ISBN 1-57189-135-8.
- The Power of Kabbalah. Kabbalah Publishing. 2004. ISBN 1-57189-250-8.
- The Red String Book: The Power of Protection. Kabbalah Publishing. 2004. ISBN 1-57189-248-6.
- The Spiritual Rules of Engagement: How Kabbalah Can Help Your Soul Mate Find You. Kabbalah Publishing. 2008. ISBN 978-1-57189-592-9.
- "Yehuda Berg, el líder espiritual de la Kabbalah, se confesó con El País". Interview (in Spanish). elpais. 17 August 2017.
- "El negocio millonario del rabino cabalista y su familia". Interview (in Spanish). El observador.
- ""La plenitud se consigue con el amor propio": Yehuda Berg". Interview (in Spanish). Anadolu Agency.
