= Ne'emanei Torah Va'Avodah =

Religious Zionist nonprofit organization

- נאמני תורה ועבודה
- logo
- Abbreviation: NTA
- Formation: Founded 1978
- Headquarters: Jerusalem, Israel
- Key people: Elad Caplan, CEO; Chairman, Assaf Benmelech; President, Rabbi Ronen Lubich
- Website: http://www.toravoda.org.il/en

Ne’emanei Torah Va’Avodah (NTA; Hebrew: נאמני תורה ועבודה, "Loyalists of Torah and Labor") is a nonprofit organization in Israel that focuses on education research and policy in the Religious Zionist community. The organization supports democratizing the State-controlled religious services, so that the public plays a greater role in religious decision making and functions.

== History ==
In the late 1970s, religious parents in Israel were concerned about aggressive secularization of the religious public school system. In light of this, parent organizations emerged to establish separate religious public school institutions. In primary school education, the "Noam" network was first established, and then later in post-primary a group connected to Bnei Akiva established the Ulpana (pl. Ulpanot) high school institution for religious girls. Facing this organization of parent groups, who wanted to separate and strengthen the religious aspect of public school education, a counter-ideological group emerged from the foundation of "Torah and Avodah", who feared the consequences of seclusion in separate institutions and the extremism in religious education that could lead, in their opinion, to religious education deviating from religious Zionism.

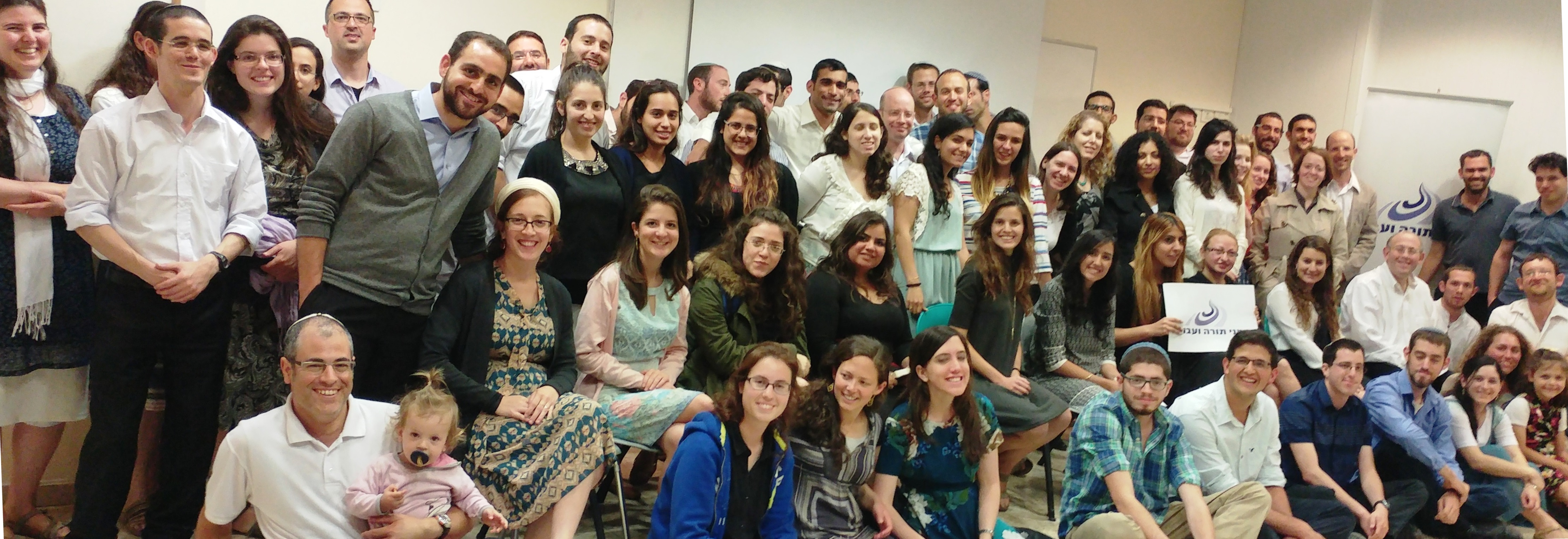
Youth Gathering of Ne'emanei Torah Va'Avodah at Agron Hostel. Jerusalem, 2016

Ne'emanei Torah Va'Avodah was founded in 1978 as one of these counter-ideological groups. It was especially concerned about the reduction of secular studies in the religious public school and the move to separate the sexes in elementary school education. The name Ne'emanei Torah Va'Avodah stems from its connection to the slogan, “Torah and Avodah” of religious Zionism. The religious Zionists of Hapoel Hamizrachi stressed that “Torah and Avodah” means that there is responsibility to demand social justice in every aspect of society.

After its founding, NTA became active in other social and religious issues. In 1987, NTA lobbied for equal rights for women in religious councils. It was a litigant in the legal case before the Supreme Court of Israel, arguing that Leah Shakdiel must be allowed to serve on the local religious council in Yeruham.

In 1995, following the assassination of Yitzhak Rabin, the leadership of NTA called for religious children to be educated to think critically about important topics and not to be pulled toward fundamentalism. In 2012 NTA organized an alternative rally to remember Prime Minister Rabin for national religious youth.

In 2014 the organization was involved in attempts to decentralize the hierarchical model of the Chief Rabbi and represented Rabbi Avi Weiss when the Chief Rabbinate of Israel rejected his authority on conversion to Judaism. In 2019, NTA launched an online interview portal, “The Room for Questions” (Heb. Cheder Ha'shelot). “The Room for Questions” features leading contemporary religious figures answering existential and halakhic questions for adolescents and parents.

== Religious leadership ==
The organization is guided by male and female religious and lay leaders. NTA emphasizes the responsibility of religious autonomy in halakhic decision making. NTA partners with rabbinic organizations outside Israel to strengthen the relation to Jews of the Diaspora. It has partnered with the International Rabbinic Fellowship to support the rights of Orthodox rabbis around the world.

== Administration ==
In 2020 the Chairman of Ne'emanei Torah Va'Avoda is Assaf Benmelech. Shmuel Shattach served as CEO from 2008 until 2024. In 2024, Elad Caplan was named as the new CEO. Rabbi Ronen Lubich is the President.

== Education ==
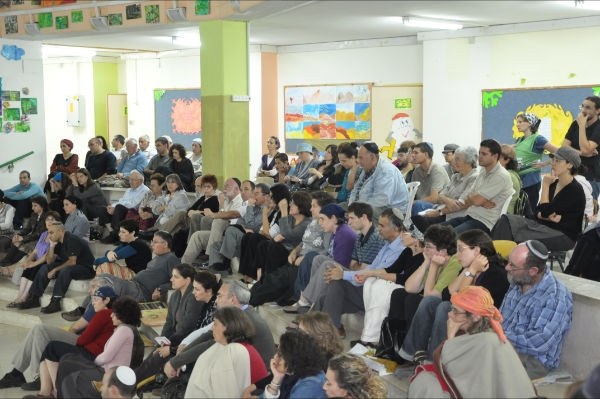
Parents' Evening of the Mamlachti Dati Dror School led by Ne'emanei Torah Va'Avodah

NTA supports open admissions to religious public schools and opposes elitist admissions processes that filter out students from religious government public schools based on the students' social or family background. The organization works with religious public school administrators and parents to set inclusive policies. NTA has opposed racist policies in the admissions process to Israeli schools. In 2019 the organization stated: "Over the past three years, the [education] minister has certified a number of Talmud Torah schools that directly and indirectly screen students of low socioeconomic status and of Ethiopian descent." "The government should narrow its support for private institutions, which harm public education in Israel," the movement said.

NTA reinforces the values of Torah and Avodah by teaching the social responsibility of the religious population within the broader national context. In the religious Zionist school system, it emphasizes that religious schools should be public—open to all without elitism or discrimination. It promotes mathematics and science study in the religious school network. In the youth movement sector, it supports the continuation of traditional Torah and Avoda values, specifically in the Bnei Akiva youth movement. NTA believes that youth groups such as Bnei Akiva should model social responsibility with equal opportunities for both genders to participate fully in religious life, without taking any particular political stances. The organization provides educational seminars for youth and adults on Torah learning for women and the integration of women into the Israel Defense Forces.

== Religious activism ==
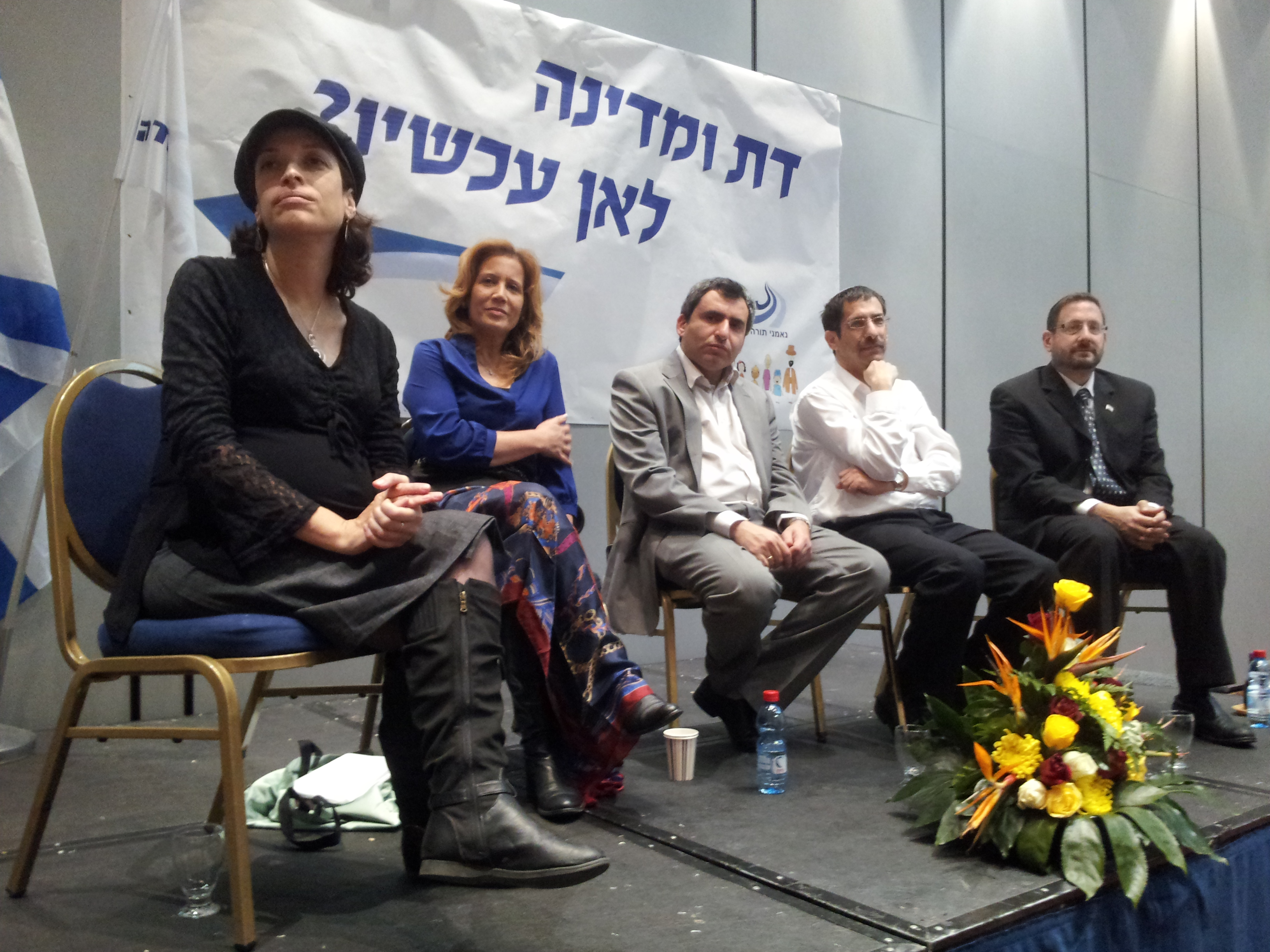
Discussion on Israeli Religion and State Issues. NTA, 2013

The movement supports comprehensive reforms in the religious services in the State of Israel. NTA is a leading advocate for change in the structure of the Chief Rabbinate of Israel's office. The movement believes that the Chief Rabbi should occupy an important spiritual role in the public, but with diminished power to exercise religious coercion over the general public. The organization has led efforts for changes in the process of religious conversions. The organization has called for comprehensive reform of the rabbinical court system with communities electing their own religious leaders. NTA advocates for reforms in the laws regulating marriage in Israel. NTA advocates for a solution for the thousands of Israeli citizens who are unable to marry in Israel because of religious law restrictions. NTA criticized Rabbi Shlomo Aviner for comments that they said objectified women. The organization stated: "our children's educational institutions [should] not have male rabbis or educators who will address our daughters in such a way." NTA has supported gender equality in religious publications for the religious school system. It is active in community-building projects to strengthen religious schools and the neighborhoods around them. The organization supports the rights of religious women to serve in the IDF. On the kashrut front, the organization advocates reform of kosher policies that make it difficult for restaurants open on Shabbat to be considered kosher. Responding to the Sephardic Chief Rabbi's critical remarks about conversion therapy, Ronen Lubich, the president of NTA stated that this reflects and "unhealthy obsession" and the rabbis should strive for "inclusion and respect" for the LGBT community.

== Criticism ==
The organization has faced criticism from some in the Orthodox community for its positions on contentious issues. In 2005, academic Yoel Finkelman dismissed the organization and other left-wing religious Zionist organizations for failing to make as large an impact as right-wing groups, and for "earning the scorn" of many in the committed Orthodox population. In 2018, Yated Ne'eman warned that the organization is "a radical advocacy and lobbying organ that seeks to change the face of Orthodoxy in Eretz Yisrael." The Yated Ne'eman newspaper noted, "Its board of governors includes Avi Weiss, Shlomo Riskin, and others, such as Benny Lau (i.e. Binyamin Lau), Daniel Sperber, and Tamar Ross, who join them in reforming Orthodoxy by ordaining women, lobbying for To’eivah marriage, diluting geirus standards and much more. ITIM's Seth Farber, who previously censured the Chief Rabbinate of Israel for rejecting Reform conversions, also sits on the Ne’emanei Torah Va’Avodah board." In 2019 Rabbi Amihai Eliyahu told Tehila Friedman, a former Chairwoman of Ne'emanei Torah Va'Avodah, that the organization was doing more harm than good to the religious Zionist community in Israel.

== Books and journals ==
From 1990-1998 the organization published the journal Gilyon. In a new format from 1998 until the present, the journal De'ot has been published publication of the organization, with contributions voices of the modern religious community in Israel. The educational booklet "Etzah La'Derekh" is a publication for the edification of Israeli high school students. Et Lidrosh was a pamphlet that was distributed to synagogues.
