= Karen Berg (writer) =

American author (1942–2020)

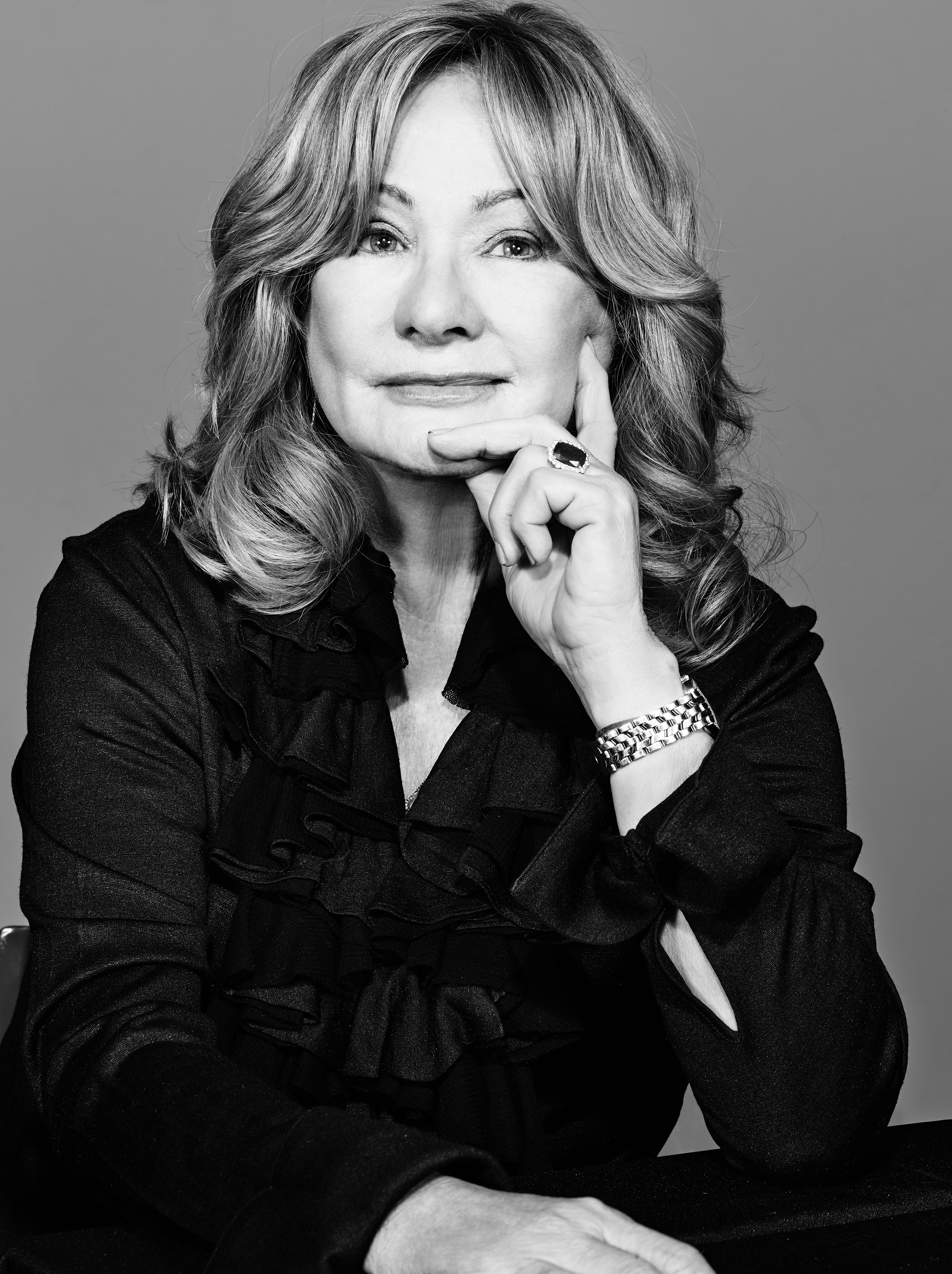
- Born: Karen Mulnick; October 12, 1942
- Died: July 30, 2020 (aged 77)
- Occupations: Author, Founder of Kabbalah Centre International

Karen Berg (October 12, 1942 – July 30, 2020) was an author and the founder of the Kabbalah Centre International. She is the author of five books; God Wears Lipstick: Kabbalah for Women; Simple Light, Wisdom from a Woman's Heart; To Be Continued, Reincarnation and the Purpose of our Lives; Finding the Light through the Darkness, Inspirational lessons rooted in the Bible and the Zohar.; and Two Unlikely People to Change the World, A Memoir.

== Career ==
Born Karen Mulnick on October 12, 1942, Berg grew up in a Jewish family. She first encountered orthodox Judaism while working at a New York insurance office, where she met Philip Berg. She and Philip Berg later married in 1971. The couple moved to Jerusalem with Suri Shamouelian and Leah Arnon, Karen Berg's two daughters from a previous marriage and had two sons, Yehuda and Michael, born in 1972 and 1973. Philip began teaching Kabbalah with Berg supporting him. They set up The Research Centre of Kabbalah in Tel Aviv. After living there for 12 years, they moved to Richmond Hill in Queens, New York, where their home became the Kabbalah Centre's first U.S. location. The Bergs later moved to Beverly Hills.

In 2005, Berg wrote God Wears Lipstick: Kabbalah for Women. The book discusses ancient Kabalistic wisdom. She also wrote Simple Light, Wisdom from a Woman's Heart in 2008.

Berg founded The Kabbalah Centre Charitable Foundation, Spirituality for Kids, an online program that works to help at-risk kids and teens. In 2005, she founded Kids Creating Peace, an organization that works with children in war-torn areas of the Middle East.

Philip Berg died in 2013. After his death, Berg and the couple's son Michael directed the daily activities of the centre. Karen Berg became spiritual leader of the Kabbalah Centre. In 2016, Berg wrote Finding the Light Through the Darkness: Inspirational Lessons Rooted in the Bible and the Zohar.

Berg died on July 30, 2020, at the age of 77. She was interred next to Rav Berg in Tzfat Israel on August 2, 2020.

== Bibliography ==
- Karen Berg (2005). God Wears Lipstick: Kabbalah for Women. Kabbalah Centre. ISBN 9781571892430.
- Karen Berg (2008). Simple Light, Wisdom from a Woman's Heart. Kabbalah Publishing.
- Karen Berg (2012). To Be Continued, Reincarnation and the Purpose of Our Lives. Kabbalah Publishing.
- Karen Berg (2016). Finding the Light Through the Darkness. Kabbalah Publishing.
