= Philip Berg =

American rabbi and dean of the Kabbalah Centre

Rabbi Philip Berg
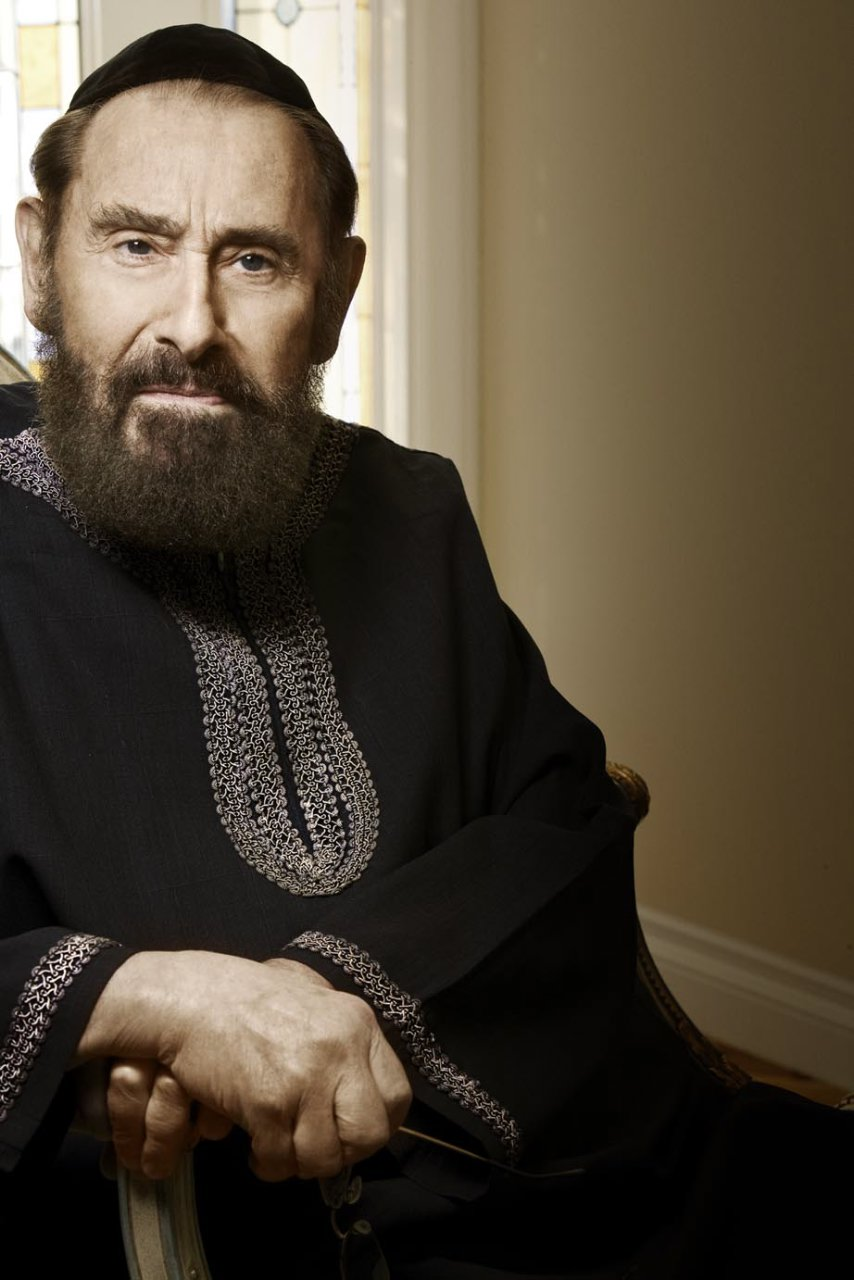

Personal life
- Born: Shraga Feivel Gruberger; August 20, 1927 Brooklyn, New York
- Died: September 16, 2013 (aged 86)
- Buried: Safed Jewish cemetery, Israel
- Spouse: Rivkah Brandwein; Karen Mulnich
- Children: 8 (with Brandwein): 2 (with Mulnich): Yehuda; Michael
- Education: Beth Medrash Govoha

Religious life
- Religion: Judaism
- Denomination: Orthodox

Jewish leader
- Position: Dean
- Organisation: Kabbalah Centre

Philip S. Berg (original name Shraga Feivel Gruberger, Hebrew: שרגא פייבל; August 20, 1927 – September 16, 2013) was an American rabbi and dean of the worldwide Kabbalah Centre organization.

Berg was a great populariser of Ashlagian Kabbalah. Having written a number of books on the subject of Kabbalah, Berg expanded its access to a greater audience than traditionally permitted, one which included secular Jews, non-Jews and women. Berg initially aimed at returning alienated Jews to their heritage through the teachings of Yehuda Ashlag; he later adopted a more universalistic approach.

There is disagreement about whether Berg's teachings, as relayed through the Kabbalah Centre, have sufficient grounds and/or genuine authority according to halakha (Jewish law), as they include some dogmas and translations differing markedly from those of more-traditional Kabbalists. Some Jewish scholars emphatically reject such teachings, deeming them as foreign to both the Kabbalah in particular and to Judaism in general.

In poor health following a stroke in 2004, Berg died on September 16, 2013.

== Biography ==
Berg was born as Shraga Feivel Gruberger in 1927 in Brooklyn, to an Orthodox Jewish family. His father, Max Gruberger, immigrated from Nadvirna, Galicia (Ukraine), and worked as a clothes presser in Williamsburg. In his youth, Berg underwent Talmudic education at Lakewood Yeshiva under Rabbi Aharon Kotler. He later returned to Williamsburg, where in 1951 at age 22 he received ordination from Yeshiva Torah Vodaas. Berg went into the business world and worked as an insurance agent for New York Life. He also became involved in real estate, and by 1962 it is claimed he was a millionaire. It is likely that he began to be called Philip during this time, as it is not unusual practice among Jews with Yiddish names to use an English equivalent while working in a secular environment.

Berg's first wife, Rivkah Brandwein, had an uncle named Yehuda Brandwein, whom Berg first met on a trip to Israel in 1962. Brandwein, a Hasidic rabbi from the Stretiner Hasidic dynasty and a close student in the Kabbalistic circle around Yehuda Ashlag, would become Berg's Kabbalistic mentor. Brandwein was the head of the Religious Department of the Israeli national workers union, Histadrut, and established Yeshivat Kol Yehuda (named after Ashlag) as a continuation of his mentor's yeshiva/publishing house "Beit Ulpana Itur Rabbanim". The uniqueness of Kol Yehuda was that students focused on kabbalistic study. The students would receive a salary to cover their living expenses so they could devote themselves to full-time learning. However, Brandwein faced difficulty in finding funds for the yeshiva and publishing. Berg had become Brandwein's book distributor and fundraiser in the United States, and it is likely he was encouraged by Brandwein to establish the National Institute for the Research in Kabbalah in New York in 1965 to aid the yeshiva.

After Brandwein's death in 1969, Berg returned to the United States and began working again with his former secretary (and future wife) Karen, on the condition that she let him teach her Kabbalah, a discipline he claimed was reserved exclusively for men. In 1971, Philip and Karen married and traveled to Israel. It was there that they changed their surname from Gruberger to Berg, as it was a common practice to shorten a European Jewish surname upon moving to Israel. In 1973, the Bergs returned to Queens, New York, where they established their full-time headquarters during the 1980s.

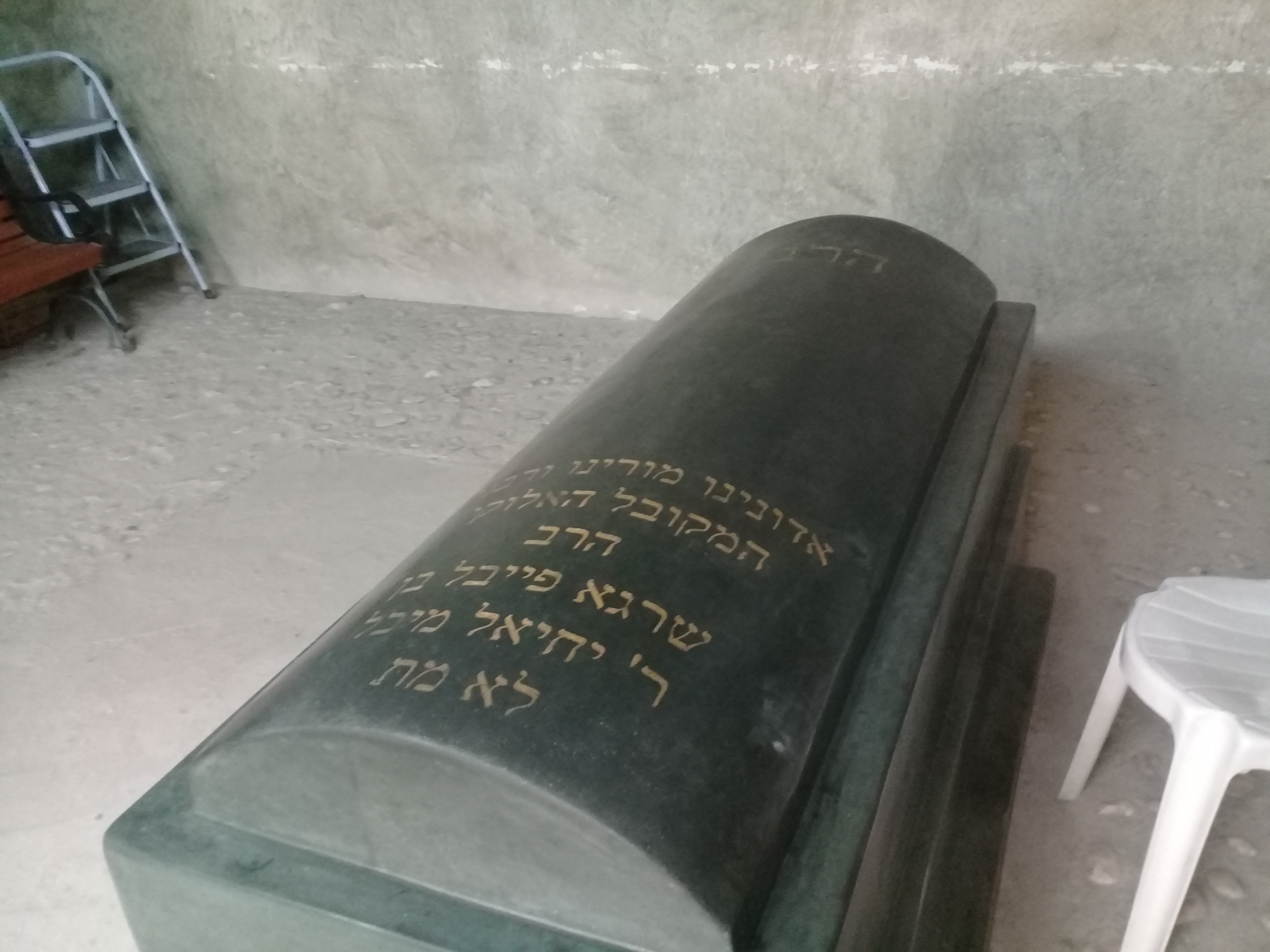
Philip Berg's grave in the Safed Jewish Cemetery

Berg, who had been ill since suffering a stroke in 2004, died on September 16, 2013. He was generally reported to be 86 (although the Los Angeles Times reported that according to public records he was 84). He is survived by his wife Karen and two sons, Yehuda and Michael, who have led the Kabbalah Centre since his stroke. Besides these two children Berg also had eight children from his first marriage that renounced Berg and his teachings.

== The Research Centre of Kabbalah ==
In July 1965, Berg was initially involved in the founding of a publishing house called "The National Institute for the Research in Kabbalah" along with Ashlag's American student Levi Krakovsky, who died the following year. The institute was most likely a fundraising branch of Brandwein’s Yeshiva Kol Yehuda, as books published by the institute have Brandwein named as the senior figure, while Berg was listed as its president.

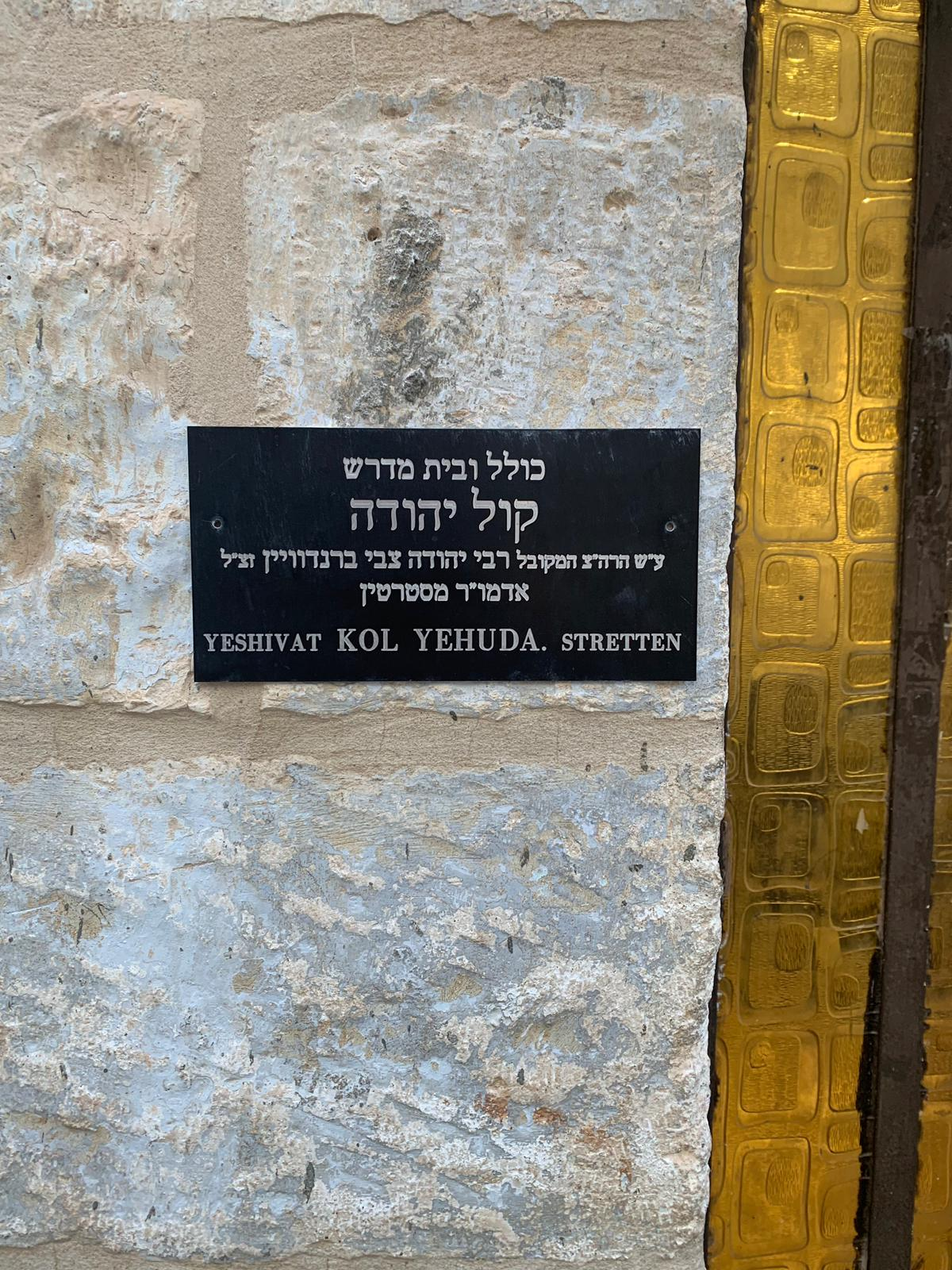
Rabbi Brandwein's Yeshivat Kol Yehuda, Ha-Yehudim St. in the Old City of Jerusalem

Krakovsky was an emissary of Ashlag’s yeshiva "Itur Rabbanim", and had translated some of Ashlag's writings into English to support the yeshiva. He also wrote his own English introductory books to Kabbalah, and in the 1930s established his own yeshiva in the United States for the purpose of teaching Kabbalah in English. Krakovsky’s writings were also published by the new Institute.

In 1970, Berg legally changed the name of the National Institute to "The Research Centre of Kabbalah", establishing it as an independent centre and publishing books of his own. His writings ranged from a basic introduction and explanation of Lurianic and Ashlagian Kabbalah to astrology and reincarnation. In 1971, Berg moved to Israel where he strengthened the centre, gave lectures and disseminated his books. In 1980, he established a yeshiva, "Or Hozer le’Limud ha-Nigleh ve ha-Nistar" (Returning Light for the Study of the Revealed and the Concealed) in Tel Aviv, which circulated various kabbalistic works. On his return to the United States in 1984 with a number of Israeli students called the Hevre (friends), Berg expanded the centre to more locations.

The aim of the now independent research centre was to resolve a widespread spiritual crisis affecting Jews, where many found traditional Judaism dry and unfulfilling. Large numbers of young Jews were seeking Eastern spiritual practices, involving themselves in dangerous cults or resorting to atheism. Berg, who believed Judaism was being taught dogmatically, was determined to show inquisitive soul-searching Jews that the answers could be found in Kabbalah.

=== Controversy ===
There is some disagreement over who succeeded Brandwein as dean of the 80-year-old Yeshiva Kol Yehuda in Jerusalem. Berg has claimed to have replaced Brandwein, his ex-uncle-in-law by his first wife, in that role; that claim was disputed by Brandwein's son Avraham, who served as dean until his death in 2013. The Los Angeles Task Force on Cults and Missionaries claimed Berg was not affiliated with the yeshiva, although a letter sent to him by Brandwein in July 1968 indicated he was President of the yeshiva.

In 2010, the Internal Revenue Service launched an investigation, reportedly investigating whether funds were directed to the personal enrichment of the Berg family and subpoenaed financial records of the organization and two affiliated charities connected to Madonna. The centre called the allegations "merit-less" and said it "intends to defend the case vigorously".

== Publications of Berg and the Research Centre of Kabbalah ==
- Philip S. Berg, The Wheels of a Soul. Research Centre of Kabbalah, 1984. ISBN 0-943688-13-2
- Philip S. Berg, Astrology, the Star Connection: The Science of Judaic Astrology. Research Centre of Kabbalah, 1987. ISBN 0-943688-37-X
- Philip S. Berg, Kabbalah for the Layman, Vol. I. Research Centre of Kabbalah, 1981. ISBN 0-943688-00-0
- Philip S. Berg, Kabbalah for the Layman, Vol. II. Research Centre of Kabbalah, 1988. ISBN 0-943688-83-3
- Philip S. Berg, Kabbalah for the Layman, Vol. III. Research Centre of Kabbalah, 1988. ISBN 0-943688-70-1
- Philip S. Berg, Kabbalistic Astrology Made Easy. Research Centre of Kabbalah, 1999. ISBN 1-57189-053-X
- Rav P. S. Berg, Kabbalistic Astrology: And the Meaning of Our Lives. Kabbalah Publishing, 2006. ISBN 1-57189-556-6
- Philip S. Berg, Power of Aleph Beth, Volume 1. Research Centre of Kabbalah, 1988. ISBN 0-943688-10-8
- Philip S. Berg, Power of Aleph Beth, Volume 2. Research Centre of Kabbalah, 1988. ISBN 0-943688-57-4
- Philip S. Berg, Time Zones. Research Centre of Kabbalah, 1990. ISBN 0-924457-01-5
- Yehuda L. Ashlag, Compiled and edited by Philip S. Berg, An Entrance to The Zohar. Research Centre of Kabbalah, 1974. ISBN 0-943688-34-5
- Yehuda Ashlag, Compiled and edited by Philip S. Berg, An Entrance to The Tree of Life. Research Centre of Kabbalah, 1977. ISBN 0-943688-35-3
- Philip S. Berg, The Kabbalah Connection. Research Centre of Kabbalah, 1983. ISBN 0-943688-03-5
- Yehuda L. Ashlag, Translated by Rabbi Levi I. Krakovsky, Ten Luminous Emanations, Volume 1. Research Centre of Kabbalah, 1969. ISBN 0-943688-29-9
- Yehuda L. Ashlag, Compiled and edited by Philip S. Berg, Ten Luminous Emanations, Volume 2. Research Centre of Kabbalah, 1973. ISBN 0-943688-09-4
- Rabbi Levi I. Krakovsky, The Light of Redemption. Research Centre of Kabbalah, 1970. ASIN B0006F83A8
- Rabbi Moses C. Luzzatto, General Principles of The Kabbalah. Research Centre of Kabbalah, 1970. ASIN B0006C9K1W

== See also ==
- Yehuda Berg
