= Tehila Friedman =

Israeli lawyer and politician (born 1976)

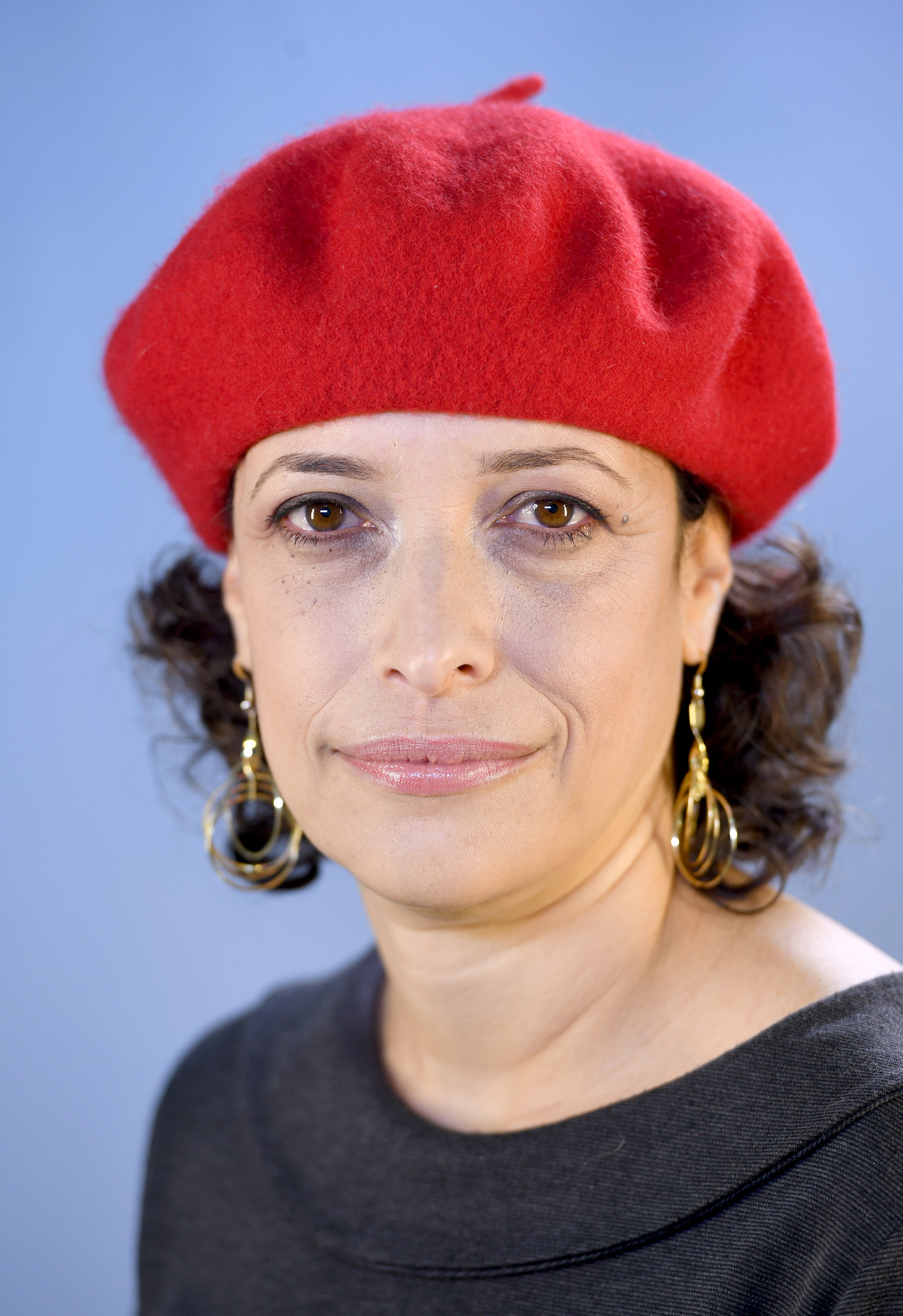
- Friedman in 2021

Faction represented in the Knesset
- 2020–2021: Blue and White

Personal details
- Born: 11 June 1976 (age 49); Kiryat Ono, Israel

Tehila Na'ama Friedman (Hebrew: תהלה נעמה פרידמן; born 11 June 1976) is an Israeli lawyer and politician. She served as a member of the Knesset for the Blue and White alliance from 2020 to 2021.

== Biography ==
Friedman earned a master's degree in law at Tel Aviv University. She subsequently became chair of the Ne'emanei Torah Va'Avodah organisation.

In 2018 Friedman joined Yesh Atid. When it became part of the Blue and White alliance she was placed fortieth on its list for the April 2019 elections, but the party won only 35 seats. She was given the thirty-eighth spot for the September 2019 elections, again failing to win a seat. Given the same slot for the March 2020 elections, she again failed to win a seat, but entered the Knesset on 19 June as a replacement for Michael Biton, who had resigned his seat under the Norwegian Law after being appointed to the cabinet. Between the election and entering the Knesset she defected to the Israel Resilience Party after Yesh Atid left the Blue and White alliance. She lost her seat in the 2021 elections.
