= Kabbalah Centre =

Nonprofit organization in Los Angeles, US

Kabbalah Centre International
- Formation: 1965; 61 years ago
- Founder: Rabbi Philip Berg
- Type: Non-profit organization
- Headquarters: Los Angeles, California, United States
- Website: www.kabbalah.com

The Kabbalah Centre International is a non-profit organization located in Los Angeles, California, that provides courses on the Zohar and Kabbalistic teachings online as well as through its regional and city-based centers and study groups worldwide. The Kabbalah Centre's presentation of Kabbalah was developed by its director, Philip Berg, along with his wife, Karen Berg.

== History ==
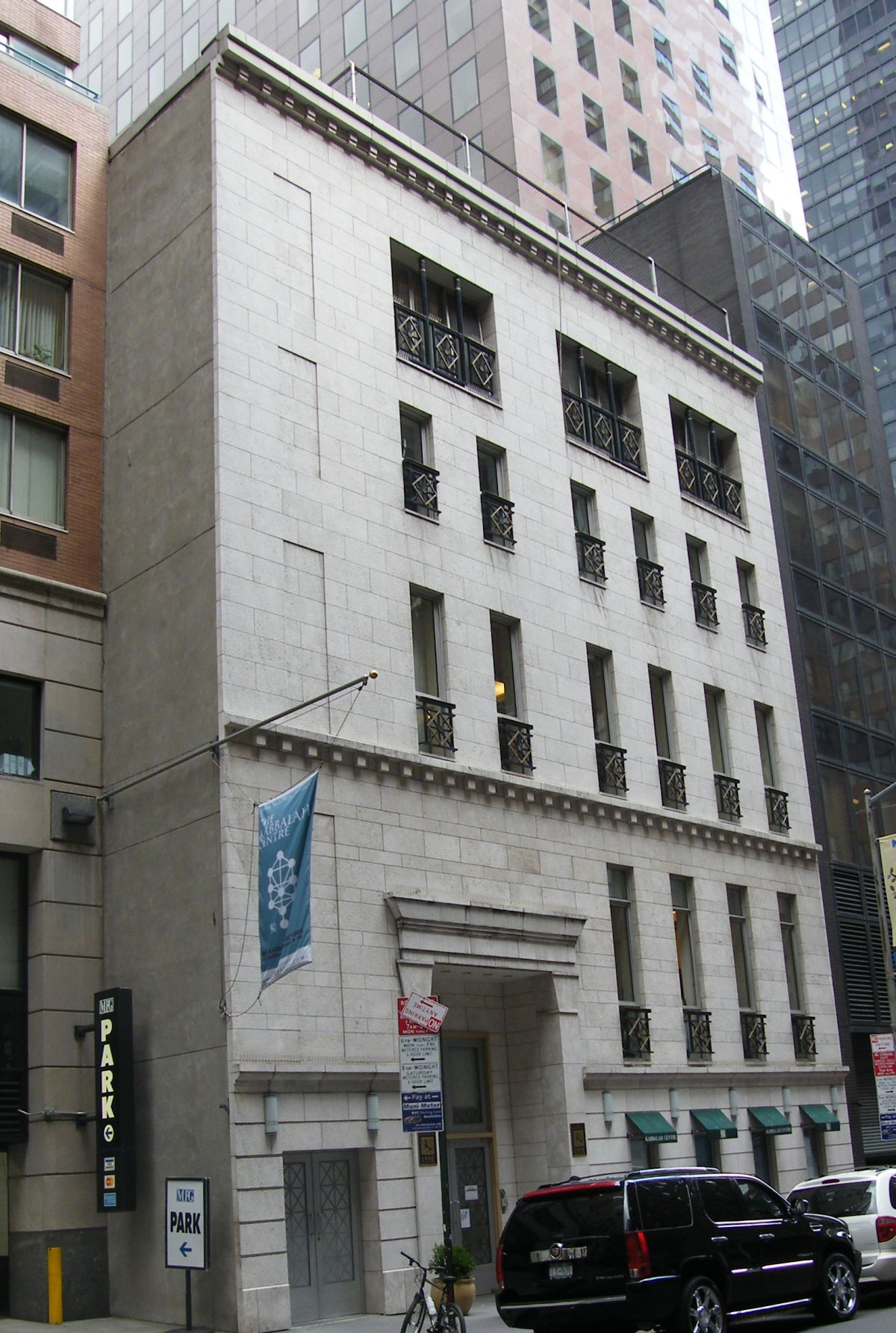
Kabbalah Centre in New York City in 2008

The Kabbalah Centre was founded in the United States in July 1965 initially as a publishing house called "The National Institute for the Research in Kabbalah" by Philip Berg (born Feivel Gruberger) and Rabbi Levi Isaac Krakovsky. It is likely that Berg was encouraged by his Rebbe and former wife's uncle Yehuda Tzvi Brandwein to establish the publishing house to aid the funding of Brandwein's Yeshiva in Jerusalem. Brandwein was the dean of Yeshivah Kol Yehuda, his son Rabbi Abraham Brandwein succeeded him as the head of the Yeshivah. Kol Yehuda was founded in 1922 and continues to this day. The uniqueness of Kol Yehuda is that students focus on kabbalistic study. The students would receive a salary to cover their living expenses so they can devote themselves to full-time learning, however Brandwein faced difficulty in finding funds for the yeshiva and publishing. After Brandwein's death, and after several years in Israel, Philip Berg and his wife Karen Berg, re-established the independent U.S. Kabbalah Centre in New York City.

The Kabbalah Centre in Los Angeles was opened in 1984. After the death of Berg, Karen and Michael Berg acted as directors and spiritual teachers of the organization. The organization is a registered non-profit with over fifty branches worldwide, including major ones in Los Angeles, New York City, London and Toronto.

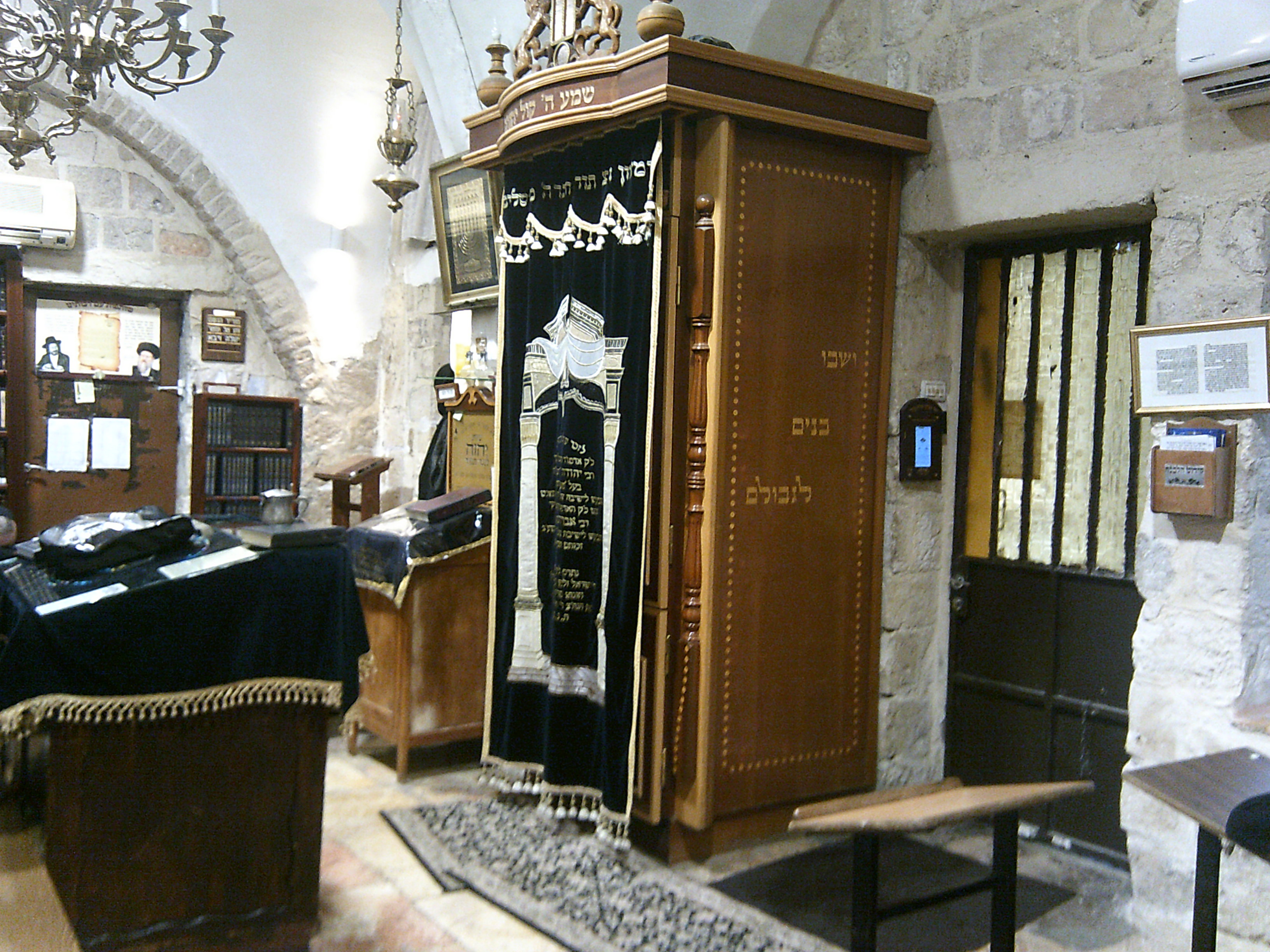
"Kol Yehuda" Yeshiva of Rabbi Yehuda Tvi Brandwein in the Old City (Jerusalem)

== Philanthropy ==
The Kabbalah Centre donates to non-profit organizations and engages in volunteer work through its Charitable Causes initiative. Charitable Causes has worked with or donated to Habitat for Humanity, Partners in Health, American Red Cross, and Sunrise Day Camp.

== Teachings ==
=== Approach ===
The Kabbalah Centre's approach to teaching is to start students with teachings of Kabbalah that do not require knowledge of Hebrew and Jewish texts.

=== Relation to religion ===
According to its views, all widely held spiritual or religious belief systems are merely specific branches of universal wisdom. The effect of this is a resemblance of religions such as Christianity, Judaism, Islam and Buddhism, as well as new-age teachings, to Kabbalah. In accordance with this belief, the Kabbalah Centre does not present itself as an alternative to any religion in particular, but rather, as a supplement to it.

=== The Bible ===
Some biblical passages, such as the Passage of the Red Sea, are understood to be codes to life and unseen universal laws which the Zohar and writings of the Kabbalists throughout history unravel. According to Berg "The Zohar reveals the dynamic interplay and interconnectedness of our universe and man's relationship to it." The Kabbalah Centre has produced a series of the Books of the Bible with Kabbalistic commentaries to each of the Weekly portion of the Torah.

=== The Light ===
One should primarily be concerned with their relationship with the essence of God, rather than God itself, as it is beyond comprehension. The essence of God is referred to in its teachings as Light.

=== 99% ===
The five senses supposedly provide access to a mere 1% of reality, which is the byproduct of a 99% reality that cannot be accessed by the senses.

=== Klippot ===
Kabbalah Centre teaches the Kabbalistic concept of Klippot. The idea is that everyone has a direct and clear connection to the upper metaphysical-spiritual world of the Light (Ein Sof, unbounded God), but that this channel is blocked by Klippot, restricting the spiritual energy from entering the physical body. It is through study and practice of Kabbalah teachings and Jewish law (which the Kabbalah Centre says is early rabbinistic construction to aid in practicing Kabbalah without revealing its secrets) that one removes Klippot, and it is by violence and negative behavior that one adds Klippot.

=== Astrology ===
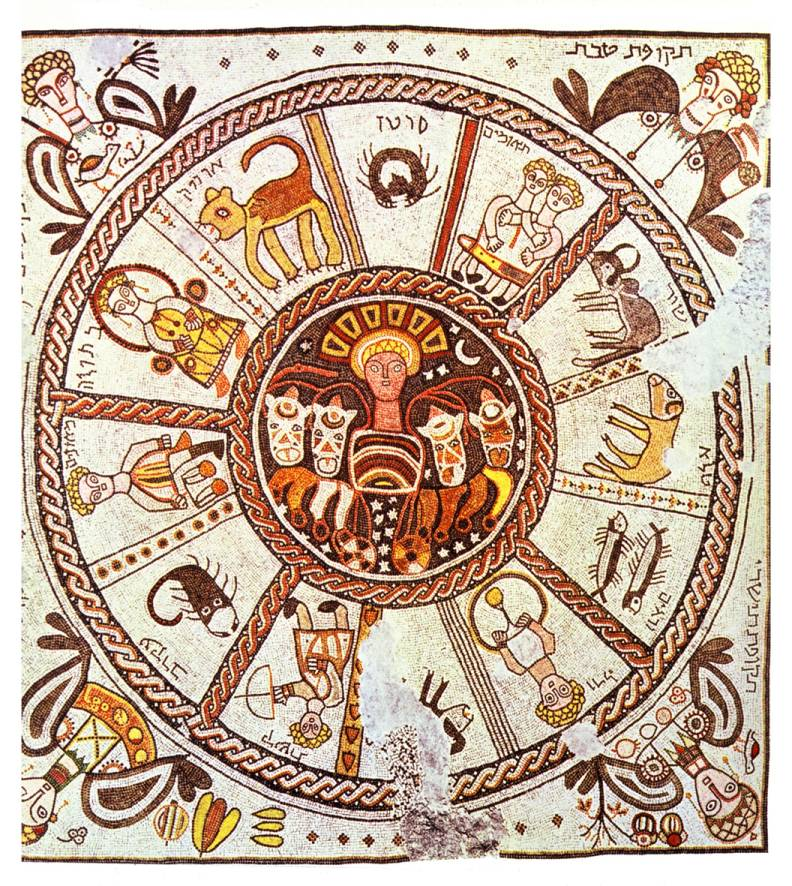
Zodiac in a 6th-century synagogue at Beit Alpha, Israel

The Kabbalah Centre has a strong belief in astrology and asserts that astrology has always been part of Judaism. Astrology was studied by Jewish scholars throughout the Middle Ages, though it was opposed by more philosophically inclined thinkers such as Maimonides.

There is a strong belief in the Kabbalah tradition that cosmic forces affect everything, and knowing how to understand them can prove to be valuable to the aspiring Kabbalist. Berg, the founder of the Kabbalah Centre, wrote numerous books on astrology during his career.

=== Sex ===
In a book written by Yehuda Berg, a former teacher at the center, he recommended that men not masturbate as semen generated without loving, shared intention does not serve its purpose. He also wrote that a man should not orgasm before the woman, as it injects selfishness into the act of love making. Other thoughts on sex include that a man should not orgasm with the woman positioned above him, as she is then drawing energies into herself from below, instead of above. The most Light is derived from sex that occurs just after midnight on Saturday morning.

== Celebrity followers ==
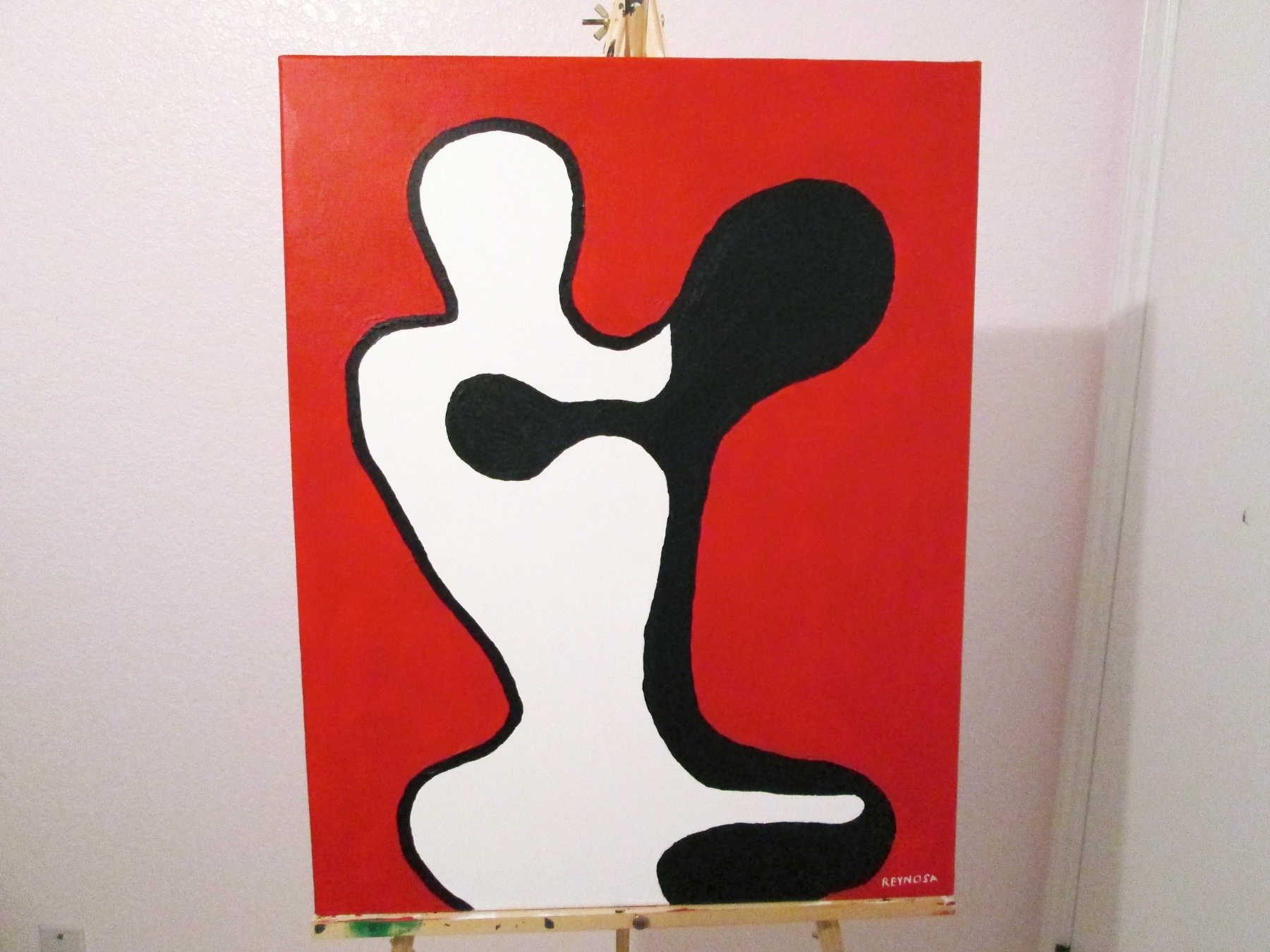
Painting of Madonna Practicing Kabbalah called Madonna and God in Mystical Oneness by Peter Reynosa

Madonna studies regularly with a personal Kabbalah Centre rabbi, no longer gives concerts on Friday night (which is the onset of Shabbat), wears the red string around her left wrist for protection and to ward off the "evil eye" (Ayin Hara), has introduced Jewish ritual objects such as tefillin ("phylacteries") into her videos and tithes regularly to the Kabbalah Centre. In July 2006, it was reported that Madonna was leaving the Kabbalah Centre and one media columnist speculated that one reason was alleged financial irregularities of donations to the centre. Despite uncorroborated allegations of financial irregularities, the rumour turned out to be false, and Madonna continued to attend Kabbalah Centre events. In August 2006, Madonna collaborated with the Kabbalah Centre on a project called Raising Malawi, which provided relief aid to the African nation of Malawi.

Celebrities that have been associated with the Centre include Britney Spears, Diane Keaton, Roseanne Barr, Sandra Bernhard, Anthony Kiedis, Mick Jagger, Jerry Hall, Lucy Liu, Alex Rodriguez, Rosie O'Donnell, Naomi Campbell, Donna Karan, Elizabeth Taylor, Paris Hilton, Nicole Richie, Kyle Richards, Heather McComb and Lindsay Lohan.

== Controversies ==
According to a BBC news article, Eliyahu Yardeni, a senior figure in the London Kabbalah Centre, made controversial comments regarding the Holocaust. The Kabbalah Centre also made claims that spring water sold by the group had among its effects a curative effect on cancer.

Other media criticisms have alleged that The Kabbalah Centre is an "opportunistic offshoot of the faith, with charismatic leaders who try to attract the rich and the vulnerable with the promise of health, wealth, and happiness."

Beginning in 2011 the centre was put under investigation by the IRS and FBI for financial malfeasance, following the abandonment of the Raising Malawi school project with millions of donors' dollars unaccounted for. In 2012, a Kabbalah Centre charity, Spirituality for Kids, accepted a $600,000 donation from an 87-year-old woman who some claim had dementia. In November 2013, two lawsuits were filed by former donors alleging that their gifts were misused.

In November 2015, the centre was ordered to pay $42,500 damages to one of its former students after it was found to have been negligent in the supervision of one of its co-directors, Yehuda Berg. Yehuda Berg, who is the founders' son, was found liable for emotional distress after a female member of the center accused him of sexual harassment and coercive drug pushing.

== Locations ==
=== The Americas ===
- Asunción, Paraguay
- Buenos Aires, Argentina
- São Paulo, Brazil
- Toronto, Canada
- Bogotá, Colombia
- Medellín, Colombia
- Cali, Colombia
- Mexico City, Mexico
- Panama City, Panama
- Caracas, Venezuela

==== United States ====
- Boca Raton, FL
- Chicago, IL
- Los Angeles, CA
- Manhattan, NY
- Queens, NY
- Miami, FL

=== Asia and the Middle East ===
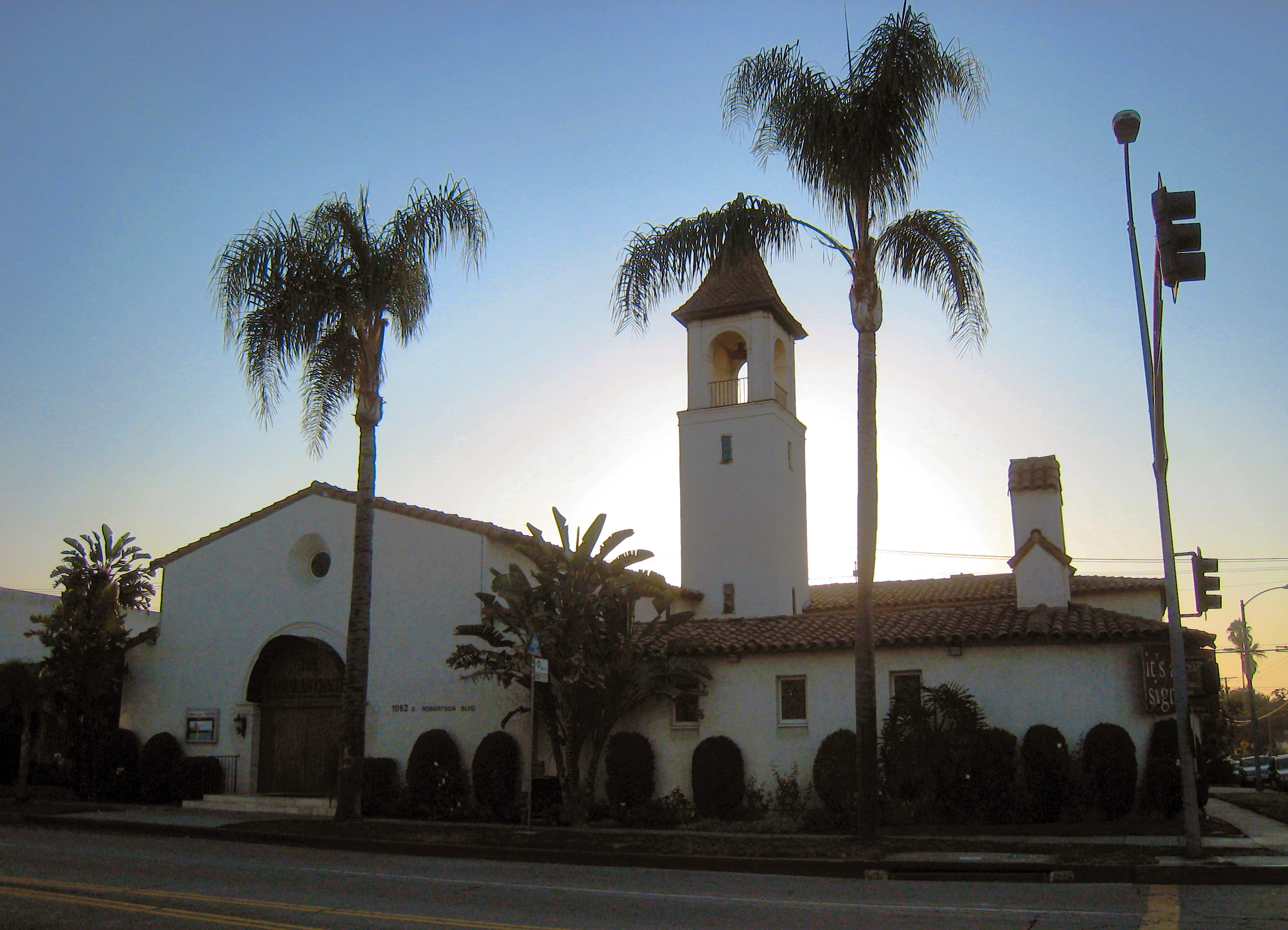
Kabbalah Centre International at 1062 S Robertson Blvd in Los Angeles, California

- Haifa, Israel
- Tel Aviv, Israel
- Makati, Philippines
- Hong Kong

=== Europe ===
- Berlin, Germany
- Milan, Italy
- Moscow, Russia
- London, UK
- Madrid, Spain
