= Baruch Ashlag =

Polish kabbalist rabbi (1907–1991)

Rabbi Baruch Shalom HaLevi Ashlag RABASH
- ברוך שלום הלוי אשלג
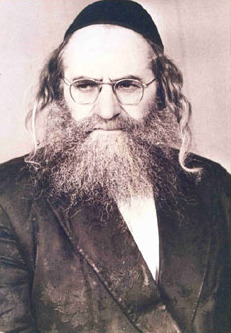
- Rabbi Baruch Shalom Ashlag
- Born: January 22, 1907; Warsaw
- Died: September 13, 1991 (aged 84); Bnei Brak, Israel
- Other name: RABASH
- Occupation: Kabbalist
- Years active: 1954–1991
- Organization(s): Institute of Kabbalah and Ashlag Hasidim
- Known for: Son and successor of kabbalist Yehuda Ashlag, Baal HaSulam
- Notable work: Shamati; Letters of the Rabash; Steps of the Ladder; Rungs of the Ladder
- Title: Authentic Kabbalist of the Master-Disciple Lineage "from Mouth to Mouth"
- Predecessor: Baal HaSulam
- Spouses: Mrs. Yohevet Ashlag; Mrs. Feiga Ashlag
- Children: ?

Baruch Shalom HaLevi Ashlag (Hebrew: ברוך שלום הלוי אשלג) (also known as the RABASH) (January 22, 1907 – September 13, 1991) was a kabbalist, the firstborn and successor of Yehuda Ashlag also known as Baal Hasulam, the author of "The Sulam" commentary on the Zohar. Among his writings: Shlavey ha Sulam ("Rungs [of] the Ladder"), Dargot ha Sulam ("Steps [of] the Ladder"), Igrot Rabash ("Letters [of the] Rabash").

== Life ==
Baruch Shalom ha Levi Ashlag (also known as the "Rabash") was born in Warsaw, Congress Poland on January 22, 1907. He began his Kabbalah studying with his father's (kabbalist Yehuda Ashlag) selected students at the age of nine, and joined him on his trips to the Rabbi of Porisov and to the Rabbi of Belz. In 1921, at age 13, he immigrated with his family to the Land of Israel, and continued his schooling at the Hasidic institution "Torat Emet".

Ashlag was ordained as a rabbi at age 20 by the chief rabbis of Israel at that time, Abraham Isaac Kook, Yosef Chaim Sonnenfeld, and Yaakov Moshe Charlap. He did not want to use the knowledge of Torah he had acquired for a living. For most of his life, he was a simple worker, doing road works, construction works, and low-level clerical work. When Ashlag grew, he became his father's prime disciple. He joined his father (Yehuda Ashlag, author of the Sulam commentary on The Book of Zohar) on his trips, did his father's errands, and provided for his father's every need.

He would often study with his father in private, and what he'd heard from his father he wrote in his personal notebook. Thus, thousands of unique notes were accumulated, documenting Yehuda Ashlag's explanations concerning the spiritual work of an individual. (Yehuda Ashlag is considered one of the foremost kabbalists of the 20th century. He is known as Baal HaSulam (Master of the Ladder) for his Sulam (Ladder) commentary on The Book of Zohar.

He studied Kabbalah with his father for more than thirty years. When his father, Baal HaSulam, fell ill, he appointed Ashlag to give the lessons to his disciples in his stead. After the death of his father, Ashlag took his father's place as the leader of the Ashlag Hasidim, and dedicated his life to continue his father's unique way, to interpret and expand on his father's writings, and to disseminate Kabbalah among the people.

Due to disputes concerning the rights to publish The Book of Zohar with the Sulam commentary that his father wrote, Ashlag left Israel for three years, spending most of that time in the United Kingdom. During that period, he also held discussions with Menachem Mendel Schneerson of Lubavitch, Joel Teitelbaum of Satmar, and other prominent rabbis. He also taught kabbalah in Gateshead and in other cities in the U.K.

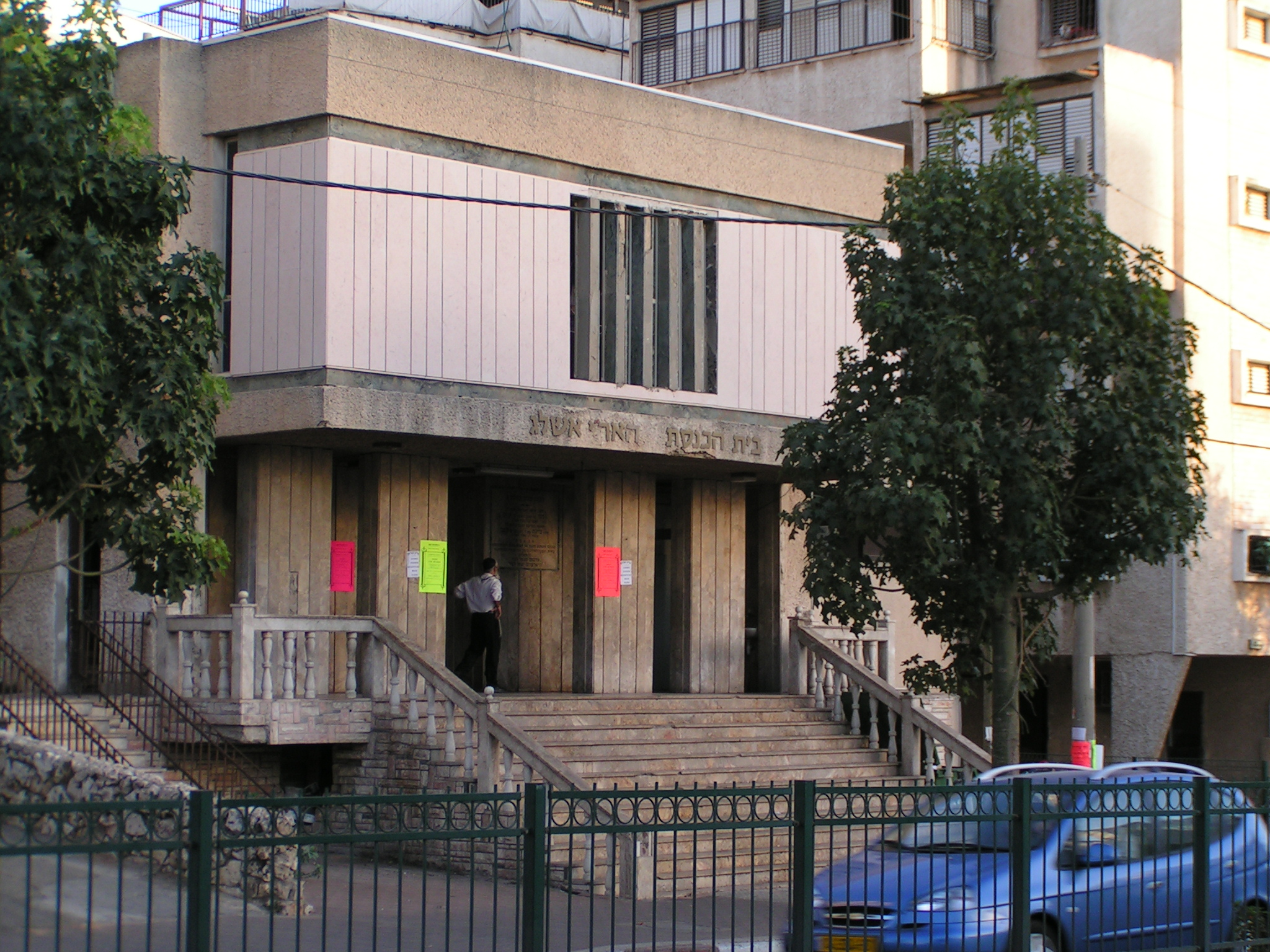
The Ari-Ashlag Synagogue, where Ashlag gave his lessons.

Upon his return to Israel, Ashlag continued to study and to teach. He did not want to become publicly known as a kabbalist; hence, as did his father, he declined any offers for official posts. After the end of the 1960s, he changed his ways and began teaching kabbalah in broader circles. He would travel to wherever there was even the smallest demand to hear about kabbalah. Among the cities he frequented were Hebron, Tiberias, and Jerusalem. In 1976, he expanded his seminary, and his humble home in Bnei Brak became a spacious synagogue. He himself moved to the second floor of the building. He would occasionally travel to Tiberias for purposes of seclusion.

In 1983, some forty new students joined the group of kabbalists that Ashlag had been teaching up to that point. To help them "fit in" with the group more easily and quickly, he began to compose essays describing the spiritual evolution of an individual, and the basics of the work in a group of kabbalists. From 1984 and up to his last day in 1991, he would write a weekly article and give it to his disciples. In time, his disciples collected the essays he had written and published them in a five volume publication known as Shlavey ha Sulam ("Rungs [of] the Ladder"). Rav Baruch Shalom HaLevi Ashlag died on September 13, 1991. He was interred on Har HaMenuchot.

== Publications ==
Ashlag's primary engagement was interpretation and expansion of his father's compositions. Ashlag's essays are a far easier read than compositions of earlier kabbalists, since they are written in a simple language. Ashlag dedicated most of his efforts to elaborate on an individual's spiritual path, from the very first steps, when one asks, "What is the meaning of my life?" to one's climb toward the revelation of the spiritual reality. His disciples testify that "the Rabash believed that any person, man or woman, and even the youngest child can study the internality of the Torah, if they only wish to complete the correction of their souls".

His primary publications:

- Shamati ("I Heard"): This is the Ashlag's personal notebook, where he wrote what he had heard from his father throughout the time he was studying with him. The uniqueness of the book is in its content, and the (conversational) language in which it is written. The book contains essays that describe the spiritual states one experiences along the spiritual path. These essays are the only documentation that we have of the conversations the author of the Sulam commentary had had with his disciples.

The book title comes from the writing that appeared on the cover of the notebook in which it was written, where Ashlag himself wrote, "Shamati" (I heard). From the 2nd printing onward, the book also contains "The Melodies of the Upper World," music notes to 15 of the melodies Baal HaSulam and Ashlag composed.

- Igrot Rabash ("Letters [of the] Rabash"): These are letters Ashlag had sent to his disciples while he was overseas. In his letters, Ashlag answers his disciples' questions concerning their spiritual path and progress, indicates the spiritual meaning of the Jewish holidays according to Kabbalah, and addresses many other issues.
- Dargot ha Sulam ("Steps [of] the Ladder"): This is a two-volume publication containing primarily utterances and notes that Ashlag had written in the course of his life. These were mostly written as drafts on scraps of paper and served as headlines, drafts for essays and answers he'd written to his disciples. This book can teach a lot about Ashlag's state of mind and thoughts, and it continues the essays in the book Shamati.
- Shlavey ha Sulam ("Rungs [of] the Ladder"): A comprehensive five-volume composition containing all of Ashlag's essays between 1984 and 1991. In this publication, Ashlag explicates in detail his kabbalistic doctrine, beginning from man's work in a group, which is a fundamental element in this teaching, through a kabbalistic interpretation of the Torah (Pentateuch) as an allegory to a person's spiritual path in our world.

== Social doctrine ==
Ashlag asserted that a human being is a social being and that one cannot exist without a society that provides for one's basic needs, and projects its values upon its members. As his father before him, Ashlag believed that an individual is constantly affected by the environment he is in. From the moment a person enters a certain society, he no longer has freedom of choice and is completely subordinate to its influence. According to Ashlag, one's only choice is the choice of the environment that will project the values one wants to adopt.

Ashlag spent many years formulating the fundamentals of building a co-operative society that strives to achieve spirituality, the way kabbalists perceived it throughout the generations: achieving love of God by means of first attaining love of man. For this reason, the bulk of Ashlag's essays are dedicated to explication and simplification of the principles of the spiritual work of an individual within such a society. The actual spiritual work is revealed through study and a process of internal transformation. Therefore the teaching cannot be understood simply intellectually and is dependent on the inner processes the disciple experiences.

== Correct approach to study ==
Ashlag asserted that two elements are imperative to one's spiritual path. First, one must find an environment that will promote one as safely and as quickly as possible toward "equivalence of form" with one's Maker. Next, one must know how to approach the study of Kabbalah correctly, so that no time is lost. Once we've explained the first element in the previous item, let us now explain the second: Kabbalists throughout the generations believed that during the study, a Light shines on a person's soul, a "Surrounding Light." To receive that Light within the soul, one need only want that Light to permeate one's soul. In other words, one needs to want to experience the states that the kabbalist who wrote the book is describing. However, this is a complex process, requiring time and considerable effort on the part of the student, since one must reach a state of "prayer," i.e. to formulate a complete desire to discover the Higher Reality. The emphasis in his teachings is not on understanding the material, but on the individual's desire. From the moment a person acquires a complete measure of desire to reach spirituality, the spiritual world opens and one discovers the Upper Worlds described by the author.

In Shamati, essay 209, he mentions three conditions to reach "genuine" prayer, a complete desire for spirituality:

There are three conditions to a prayer: a) To believe that He [the Creator] can help one. b) That one no longer has any other counsel, that one has already done all that one could, but yielded no cure to one's affliction. c) That if He does not help one, one's death is better than one's life. Prayer is a matter of work in the heart. And the more one is lost, the greater is one's prayer.

— Baruch Ashlag, Shamati, Article 209, page 568

== Successors ==
After his death, several of his disciples continued to study according to his method: Avraham Mordecai Gottlieb, Ashlag's current successor and Rebbe; Dzerke Rebbe, Aharon Brizel, who currently teaches a Hasidic version of this method in New York; as well as Feivel Okowita, who heads the Kabbalah Institute of America. Michael Laitman, Ashlag's personal assistant, heads Bnei Baruch, an organization that is based in Petach Tikva, Israel and is dedicated to disseminating the wisdom of Kabbalah to the world.

== See also ==
- Yehuda Ashlag
- Ashlag (Hasidic dynasty)

== Bibliography ==
- Feiga Ashlag, A Prayer of a Kabbalist: from the life of Rabbi Baruch Shalom Ashlag, Bnei Brak, 1997
- Gotlieb, Avraham Mordechai (1997). הסולם [The Ladder].
