= Yehuda Ashlag =

Orthodox Jewish rabbi and kabbalist (1885–1954)

- יְהוּדָה אַשְׁלַג
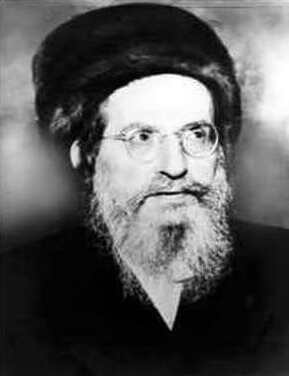
- Born: 1885; Łódź, Congress Poland
- Died: 1954 (aged 68–69); Jerusalem
- Occupation: Rabbi

Yehuda Ashlag (1885–1954) or Yehuda Leib Ha-Levi Ashlag (Hebrew: יְהוּדָה לֵיבּ הַלֵּוִי אַשְׁלַג), also known as the Baal Ha-Sulam (בַּעַל הַסּוּלָם, "Author of The Ladder") in reference to his magnum opus, was an Orthodox rabbi, kabbalist, social justice universalist, and altruistic communist born in Łuków, Congress Poland, to a family of scholars connected to the Hasidic courts of Porisov and Belz. Rabbi Ashlag lived in the Holy Land from 1922 until his death in 1954 (except for two years in England). In addition to his Sulam commentary on the Zohar, his other primary work, Talmud Eser Sefirot is regarded as the central textbook for students of Kabbalah. Ashlag systematically interpreted the wisdom and promoted its wide dissemination. In line with his directives, many contemporary adherents of Ashlag's teachings strive to spread Kabbalah to the masses.

== Biography ==
=== Poland ===
Ashlag reputedly studied Kabbalah from the age of seven, hiding pages from the book Etz Chaim "The Tree of Life" by Rabbi Hayyim ben Joseph Vital in the Talmudic tractate he was meant to be studying. At the age of twelve, he studied the Talmud independently. By nineteen, Ashlag's knowledge of the Torah was profound enough for the rabbis of Warsaw to confer upon him the title of rabbi.

During this period he worked as a judge in the court of the Warsaw rabbis and also gained experience as a teacher for training judges for Jewish courts. Ashlag also studied German while in Warsaw, read original texts of Georg Wilhelm Friedrich Hegel, Karl Marx, Friedrich Nietzsche, and Arthur Schopenhauer, and took part in socialist and communist demonstrations.

While still in Poland, he met an unidentified Warsaw merchant, who revealed himself to Ashlag as a Kabbalist. Ashlag studied with this particular teacher every night for three months, he said, “until my arrogance separated us,” and the teacher disappeared. A few months later Ashlag met the teacher again, and after pleading with him, convinced him to reveal an important kabbalistic secret. The next day, the teacher died.

=== Israel ===
In 1921, at the age of 36, Ashlag made the decision to emigrate to the Land of Israel or Palestine at the time, a journey that took several months. He spent the first few years living anonymously, supporting his family through manual labor by day and writing his commentaries at night. Eventually, he was recognized through his work, and was appointed Rabbi of Givat Shaul, Jerusalem in 1924.

Ashlag was friendly with the Kabbalist and Chief Rabbi of Mandatory Palestine, Abraham Isaac Kook, who recognized Ashlag as a great follower of Isaac Luria. Ashlag had high hopes of meeting great Kabbalists in Jerusalem including the Sephardi followers of the great 18th-century Yemeni Jewish Kabbalist Shalom Sharabi. However, he was profoundly disappointed by his encounter with them. Their views about Kabbalah ran contrary to Ashlag's experience with the teaching as a means of profound personal transformation and spiritual illumination, by becoming a vessel for divine light.

In 1926 Ashlag left for London, and it was there that he wrote his commentary on The Arizal's (Isaac Luria) book Etz Chaim. This work is entitled Panim Meirot wMasbirot. It took him one and a half years to complete this work. It was published in 1927, and in 1928 Ashlag returned to the Land of Israel (Mandatory Palestine).

In 1932 Ashlag and his family moved to Jaffa. During this period, Ashlag also began one of his main works, Talmud Eser Sefirot, a commentary on all the writings of Isaac Luria. In this undertaking, he developed a comprehensive explanation of the sequence of the creation of all of the upper worlds (Olamot Elyonim), starting with the source of emanation (Ma'atzil) and finishing with our world (Olam HaZeh). The work is divided into six volumes, containing sixteen parts and over two thousand pages. Some today consider it as the core of the entire teaching of Kabbalah.

In the 1930s Ashlag, now in his fifties, gathered around him a group of disciples, including Rav Yehuda Tzvi Brandwein, his closest student, and studied Kabbalah every night, often from shortly after midnight until dawn. He also authored many articles and letters at this time that openly promoted the study of Kabbalah on a mass scale. Ashlag went to great lengths to publish Kabbalistic material in media suitable for disseminating the knowledge he had acquired across the entire nation. He began an independent Kabbalistic newsletter publication, HaUma "The Nation", of which only one issue survived.

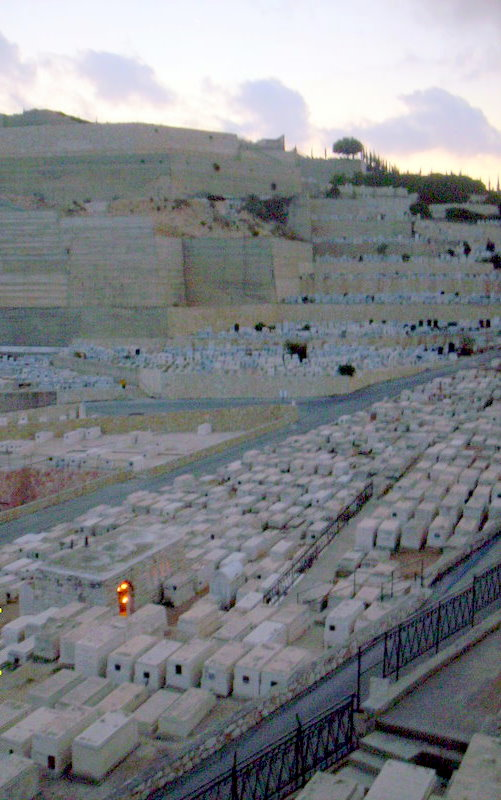
Ohel of Yehuda Ashlag on Har HaMenuchot

Ashlag differs fundamentally from all Kabbalists of the past, who studied and taught Kabbalah in a concealed manner, in that he felt a great need to reveal and clarify the teaching of Kabbalah to the masses. This was because he saw that the evil inclination in people (human egoism) would rise to an altogether new height in this era of humanity, causing an altogether new era of internal suffering felt as a meaningless and confused existence.

=== Writing of the Sulam ===
In 1943, Ashlag moved to Tel Aviv, and there began working on his book, HaSulam (The Ladder), a collection of commentaries on The Zohar. During this period, he wrote for eighteen hours a day, and due to a lack of money he was not able to afford a sufficient amount of paper and ink to write more precise explanations. He later said that if it had been within his capabilities, he would have written a full commentary on The Zohar in two-hundred volumes, but he was unable to begin the work only because of a lack of means.

He completed this work in 1953, and later added three more volumes. Rav Ashlag's closest student Rav Yehuda Tzvi Brandwein later finished the work by adding this three volumes called Tikkunei HaZohar "Maalot Hasulam". In honor of the completion of the entire work, his students organized a big feast in Meron, where Ashlag gave the speech that is today printed under the title “Maamar LeSiyum HaZohar” (“An Article for the Completion of the Zohar,” also known as “Speech in Celebration for the Conclusion of the Zohar”). Yehuda Ashlag died on the day of Yom Kippur in 1954. He was buried on cemetery Har HaMenuchot located in Givat Shaul, Jerusalem, Israel.

=== Rabbi Brandwein ===
Rabbi Yehudah Tzvi Brandwein a direct descendant of the famous first Admor of Stretin, Rabbi Yehudah Tzvi of Stretin, was a foremost disciple of Rabbi Yehudah HaLevi Ashlag (Baal HaSulam). His vast knowledge of the Lurianic system of Kabbalah enabled him to codify and edit the entire writings of the Ari HaKadosh, Rabbi Yitzchak Luria. He continued with a similar style of translation and commentary of Rabbi Yehudah Ashlag known as Maalot HaSulam (Extension of the Ladder) on those works of Rabbi Shimon bar Yochai, which Rabbi Ashlag didn't complete during his lifetime, namely Hashmatot HaZohar (Various other Writings) and Tikkunei HaZohar.

Rabbi Brandwein was one of the first Jewish settlers within the Old City of Jerusalem after the Six Day War.

Rabbi Yehuda Zvi Brandwein ran a religious school in Jerusalem called Yeshiva Kol Yehudah, founded in 1922 by Rabbi Yehuda Ashlag. For a while he also served as the chief rabbi for the Histadrut - the Israeli labor union, using his position to bring many secular Israelis back to Judaism.

== Books ==
Ashlag wrote and published two major works. The first, Talmud Eser Sefirot is a complete re-editing and commentary to the works of 16th century Kabbalist Rabbi Isaac Luria. This is a comprehensive exposition of the system of the upper worlds, Partzufim and Sefirot, in the scientific language of Kabbalah which was developed by Luria.

As a core Kabbalistic text, it is especially unique in its utmost precision to detail to the structural organization and processes occurring in the upper worlds. It is set out as a comprehensive textbook, complete with commentaries, a section in each chapter dedicated to further reflection upon the commentaries, definitions of terms, tables of questions and answers, an introduction clarifying how to study Kabbalah in the correct manner, and also a summarized preface of the entire text.

His other masterwork was his Sulam commentary on The Zohar, which earned him the name “Baal HaSulam”. This monumental work took him ten years to complete, written between the years 1943 and 1953. It includes a translation of The Zohar from Aramaic to Hebrew as well as an extensive interpretation.

Another publication is the notebook of Yehuda Ashlag's son and disciple, Baruch Ashlag. His notebook, entitled Shamati (I Heard]), contains over two hundred articles which were copied down from lessons and talks with his father. Baruch Ashlag kept this notebook with him in secret, until he was on his deathbed, in 1991. It was later published in Hebrew and has been translated into many different languages. The articles in Shamati form a unique kabbalistic work in their emotional depth of capturing the inner processes that a Kabbalist goes through on the path of spiritual attainment.

=== Works of Interest ===
- Matan Torah (Gift of the Torah)
- Perush HaSulam (Commentary of the Ladder on the Zohar)
- Talmud Eser haSefirot (Study of the Ten Luminous Emanations)
- Panim Meirot u'Masbirot (Welcoming and Illuminating Revelations)
- Ha’Akadama Le Talmud Eser haSefirot (Introduction to the Ten Luminous Emanations)
- Ha’Akadama Le Sefer HaZohar (Introduction to the Zohar)
- Mavo le Sefer HaZohar (Entrance to the Zohar)
- Pticha le Hokhmat haKabbalah (Opening to the Wisdom of Kabbalah)
- Sefer haIlan (Book of the Tree or Book of Illustrations)
- Pticha le Perush haSulam (Opening to the Sulam Commentary)
- Ha’Akadama Le Sefer Panim Meirot u’Masbirot (Introduction to Panim Meirot u’Masbirot [Welcoming and Illuminating Revelations])
- Pticha Kolelet leSefer Panim Meirot u’Masbirot (Opening to Panim Meirot u’Masbirot [Welcoming and Illuminating Revelations])

== Teachings ==
Ashlag's commentary offered a systematic interpretation of the legacy of Isaac Luria. This was the first since the 18th century when the Baal Shem Tov, Moshe Chaim Luzzatto, the Vilna Gaon and Shalom Sharabi offered their interpretation of Luria's teaching. Ashlag's system focused on the transformation of human consciousness from the "desire to receive" to the "desire to give," i.e., from egocentricity to altruism. This path of transformation is described in Lurianic Kabbalah.

Ashlag stated that the purpose of studying Kabbalah is equal to the purpose of why human beings were created, and that through its study, a person is capable of revealing the entirety of processes and structures that have taken place in the creation of the universe.

"Equivalence of form" with this source means having the same attributes or qualities as it, and Ashlag defines the qualities of this source as being altruistic, namely the desire to give, or in Ashlag's words, the "will to bestow" (Ratzon LeHashpia).

Through intensive study of Kabbalah, a person's desire to give to others is developed in relation to this goal. Ashlag believed that the coming of the Messiah meant that humans would attain this quality which would allow them to give up their selfishness and devote themselves to loving each other for the sake of life's purpose, as stated in the commandment "love thy neighbor as thyself."

Ashlag proposed fitting Kabbalah to socialism using the theory of "altruistic communism" or "komunizm altruisti". David Ben-Gurion, the first prime minister of Israel, said that "while I wanted to talk to him about Kabbalah, he wanted to talk to me about socialism and communism" and that "I was amazed that he adhered especially to Communism. He asked me several times if we will establish a communist regime after the foundation of the Jewish state." He called for Israel to be structured so that "no individual is to be occupied with something other than fulfilling God's commandments and seeing to the needs of others, ensuring they lack nothing."

He supported the Kibbutz movement and preached to establish a network of self-ruled internationalist communes, who would eventually “annul the brute-force regime completely, for ‘every man did that which was right in his own eyes.’”, because “there is nothing more humiliating and degrading for a person than being under the brute-force government”. He proposed "a kind of world religion, based on altruistic social justice, in which every culture would retain its own specific religious traditions while cooperating in uprooting exploitation and poverty" and believed in "developing a community based on love between its members and a society founded on economic justice." He believed that Israel would redeem "their oppressors, utilizing their suffering for the sake of universal spiritual progress", just as a vanguard party would lead a revolution on behalf of a proletariat that might not be sympathetic to the communist cause.

The Or HaGanuz community of Northern Israel is based on the principles of Yehudah Ashlag, and is led by Rabbi Mordechai Sheinberger, a prominent contemporary teacher of Ashlag's kabbalistic system.

== Ashlag's sons ==
- Baruch Ashlag (1906–1991)
- Shlomo Benyamin Ashlag
- Yaʿaqov (Jacob) Ashlag

== See also ==
- Ashlag (Hasidic dynasty)
